= Ingalls =

The Ingalls surname is an English name with Norse roots, deriving from either of two Old Norse personal names "Ingjaldr," or from "Ingólfr" "Ing's wolf," Ing was an ancient Germanic fertility god. Some instances of this name in Britain are thought to have evolved from the place name Ingol, in Lancashire, which is named from the Old English personal name Inga with the Old English word "holh," meaning a "hollow," or "depression."

== People ==
=== Given name ===
- Ingalls Kimball (1874–1933), American printer and entrepreneur

=== Surname ===
- Albert Graham Ingalls (1888–1958), former editor of Scientific American and amateur telescope-making enthusiast
- Barbara Ingalls Shook (1938–2008), American philanthropist from Birmingham, Alabama
- Bob Ingalls (1919-1970), American football player and coach
- Bret Ingalls (born 1960), American football coach
- Caroline Ingalls (1839-1924), mother of author Laura Ingalls Wilder
- Carrie Ingalls (1870-1946), younger sister of author Laura Ingalls Wilder
- Charles Ingalls (1836-1902), father of author Laura Ingalls Wilder
- Daniel Henry Holmes Ingalls, Jr. (born 1944), an American pioneer of object-oriented computer programming and principal architect, designer and implementer of five generations of Smalltalk environments
- Daniel H. H. Ingalls, Sr. (1916–1999), Professor of Sanskrit at Harvard University
- David Sinton Ingalls (1899–1985), American businessman, politician and first flying ace in US Navy history
- Don Ingalls (1918-2014), American screenwriter and television producer
- Edmund Ingalls (c. 1598–1648), founder of Lynn, Massachusetts
- Eliza Buckley Ingalls (1848–1918), American temperance activist
- George Alan Ingalls (1946-1967), American soldier posthumously awarded the Medal of Honor
- George L. Ingalls (1914–2001), New York politician
- Grace Ingalls (1877-1941), younger sister of author Laura Ingalls Wilder
- James Monroe Ingalls (1837–1927), American soldier and ballistics authority
- Jeremiah Ingalls (1764–1838), one of the first American composers
- John James Ingalls (1833–1900), Republican member of Kansas state legislature and U.S. Senator from Kansas
- Joshua K. Ingalls (1816–1898), inventor, land reformer, and anarchist theorist
- Laura Ingalls (disambiguation), several people
- Mary Ingalls (1865-1928), older sister of author Laura Ingalls Wilder
- Melville E. Ingalls (1842–1914), American politician and railroad president
- Rachel Ingalls (1940–2019), American-born author living in the UK
- Robert Ingersoll Ingalls, Sr. (1882–1951), American businessman and philanthropist
- Rufus Ingalls (1818–1893), US Army general and Quartermaster General
- Sheffield Ingalls (1875–1937), American banker, attorney and politician, 20th Lieutenant Governor of Kansas
- Wallace Ingalls (1859–1936), American lawyer and politician
- Wilbur R. Ingalls, Jr. (1923-1997), American architect

== Places ==
=== United States ===
- Ingalls, Arkansas, an unincorporated community
- Ingalls, Indiana. a town
- Ingalls Township, Gray County, Kansas
  - Ingalls, Kansas, a city in the township
- Ingalls, Michigan, an unincorporated community
- Ingalls, Missouri, a ghost town
- Ingalls, North Carolina, an unincorporated community
- Ingalls, Oklahoma, a ghost town
- Lake Ingalls, Washington
- Mount Ingalls (California)

=== Elsewhere ===
- Ingalls (crater), on the Moon
- Ingalls Head, New Brunswick, Locality on the Island of Grand Manan, New Brunswick

== Buildings ==
- Ingalls Building, Cincinnati, Ohio, the world's first reinforced concrete skyscraper
- Ingalls Memorial Hospital, Harvey, Illinois
- Ingalls House (disambiguation)
- Ingalls Rink, a hockey rink owned by Yale University in New Haven, Connecticut

== Other uses ==
- Ingalls Shipbuilding, now part of Northrop Grumman Ship Systems
- Albert Quinn Ingalls, a fictional character in the TV series Little House on the Prairie

== See also ==
- Ingall (surname)
- Ingles (surname)
