= Ingle (surname) =

Ingle is a surname. Notable people with the surname include:

- Ann Ingle (born 1939), British-Irish writer
- Bob Ingle (1933–2011), founder of Ingles supermarkets
- Brendan Ingle (1940–2018), Irish boxer
- Christofer Drew Ingle (born 1991), American acoustic pop musician
- Cooper Ingle (born 2002), American baseball player
- Doug Ingle (1945–2024), American rock musician
- Dwight Ingle (1907–1978), American physiologist and endocrinologist
- Hemal Ingle (born 1996), Indian actress
- James Addison Ingle (1867–1903), American missionary to China
- John Ingle (1928–2012), American actor
- John Stuart Ingle (1933–2010), American painter
- Phillip Ingle (1961–1995), American murderer
- Reggie Ingle (1903–1992), English cricketer and lawyer
- Richard Ingle (1609–1653), English colonial seaman, ship captain, tobacco trader, privateer, and pirate
- Sophie Ingle (born 1991), Welsh association football player
- Tanner Ingle (born 1999), American football player
- William Ingle (1828–1870), 19th century British sculptor
- William Ingle (cricketer) (1856–1899), New Zealand cricketer

== See also ==
- Ingles (surname)
