= Ingall =

Ingall is a surname. Notable people with the surname include:

- Francis Ingall (1908–1998), British Indian Army officer
- Lisa Ingall (born 1980), English snooker player
- Marjorie Ingall (born 20th century), American non-fiction writer
- Michael Ingall (born 1959), British businessman
- Russell Ingall (born 1964), English-born Australian Supercar driver

== Other uses ==
- Fort Ingall, a reconstructed fort museum in Quebec

== See also ==
- Ingalls (disambiguation)
- In-Gall, a town in Niger
