= Ingles (surname) =

Ingles is an Old English surname. Notable people with the surname include:

- William Ingles (1729-1782), soldier and judge in Colonial Virginia
- Mary Draper Ingles (1732-1815), American pioneer who escaped from captivity by Shawnee Indians
- H. Gil Ingles, Angolan record producer
- Harry C. Ingles (1888–1976), United States Army general
- Henry Ingles (1840–1892), New Zealand politician
- J. Lewis Ingles, American football coach
- Jodie Ingles, Australian cardiac researcher
- Joe Ingles (born 1987), Australian basketball player
- Juanmi (footballer, born 1971), Juan Miguel García Inglés, Spanish footballer
- Paul Ingles (born 1956), American radio personality

== See also ==
- Inglis (surname)
- Ingle (surname)
- Inglese, surname
- Ingalls (disambiguation), includes a list of people with surname Ingalls
