= Inglese =

Inglese is an Italian surname, literally meaning "English" or "from England". Notable people with the surname include:

- Anna Inglese, 15th-century Italian singer
- Cathy Inglese (1958–2019), American women's basketball coach
- Guglielmo Inglese (1892–1962), Italian actor, voice actor, radio personality and playwright
- Judith Inglese, American artist
- Roberto Inglese (born 1991), Italian footballer
- Veronica Inglese (born 1990), Italian long-distance runner

== See also ==
- Ingles (surname)
