= Robert Mawer =

English architectural sculptor (1807–1854)

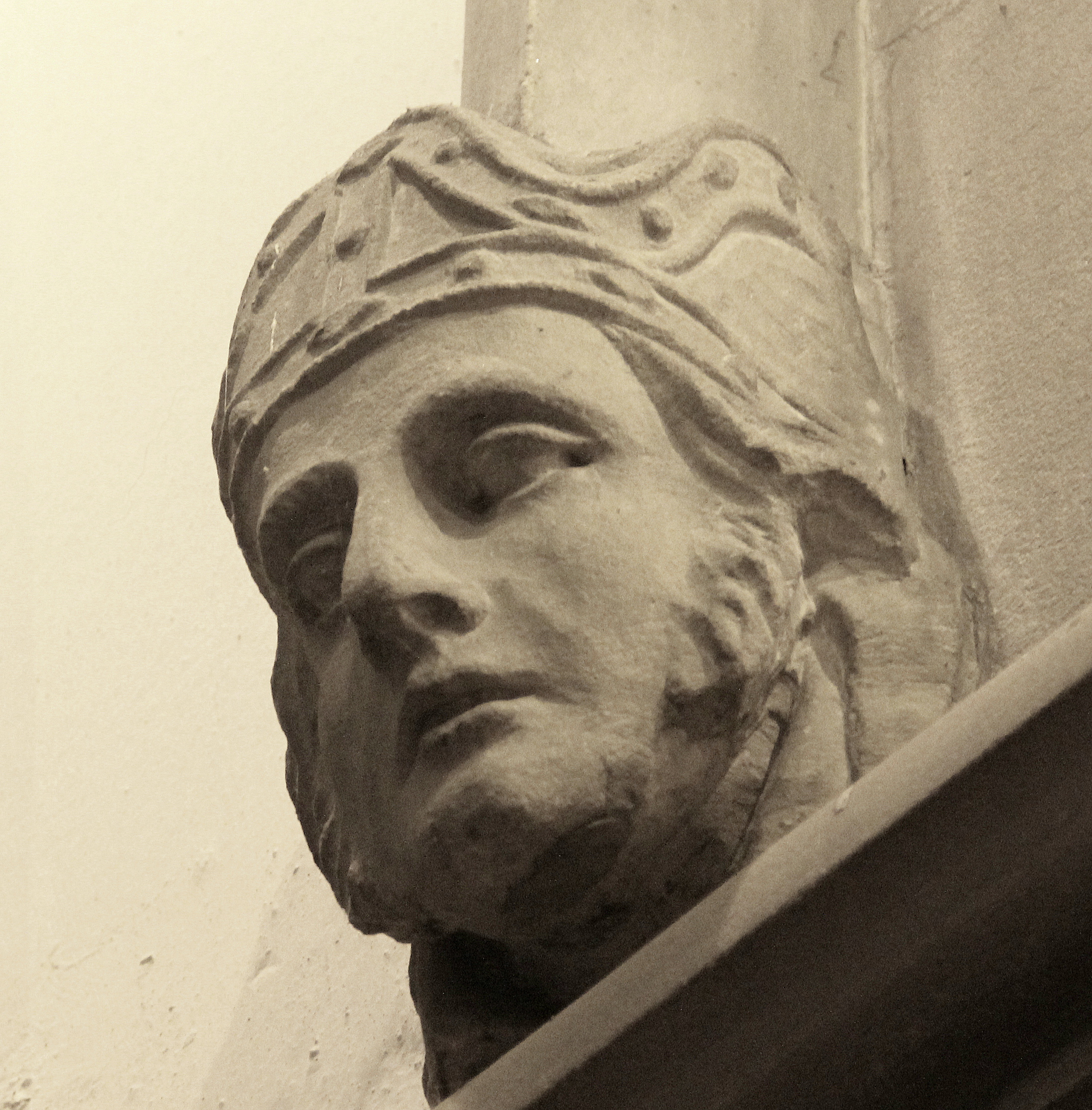
- Portrait of Robert Mawer in medieval bishop's mitre, aged 44–45, in St James' Church, Boroughbridge
- Born: circa 1807; Nidderdale
- Died: 10 November 1854, aged 47 years Leeds
- Resting place: Former St Mark's churchyard, Woodhouse, Leeds
- Notable work: Architectural sculpture on: Leeds Minster, 1841; Mill Hill Chapel, 1848; St George's Hall, Bradford, 1853; Moorlands House, Leeds, 1854; Leeds Town Hall, 1854
- Style: Gothic Revival; Neoclassical
- Movement: Aesthetic movement Romanticism; Gothic Revival; Neoclassicism
- Spouse: Catherine Mawer
- Memorials: Mawer memorial

Robert Mawer (Nidderdale 1807 - Leeds 10 November 1854) was an architectural sculptor, based in Leeds, West Yorkshire, England. He specialised in the Gothic Revival and Neoclassical styles. He created the Neoclassical keystone heads on St George's Hall, Bradford and on Moorland's House, Leeds, and was working on the keystone heads at Leeds Town Hall when he died. He was a founding member of the Mawer Group of Leeds architectural sculptors, which included his wife, Catherine Mawer, his son Charles Mawer, and his apprentices William Ingle, Matthew Taylor and Benjamin Payler, who all became sculptors with their own careers. Many of the buildings enhanced with sculpture by Robert Mawer are now listed by Historic England.

== Background ==
Robert Mawer was born around 1807 in Nidderdale. He was baptised at Middlesmoor in 1808, the son of William Mawer of Haden Carr which is now under Scar House Reservoir. The 1841 Census finds him living in New Huddersfield, Leeds. He is listed as a stonemason, and his name is misspelt "Mower". With him is his wife Catherine; both their ages are wrongly listed as 30 years. Also with him is their son Charles, aged 2 years, and Catherine's mother Elizabeth Scriven, aged 70 years. In the 1851 Census, Robert is aged 43 and living at 6a Oxford Place, Leeds, with his wife Catherine and son Charles. He describes himself as a master stone cutter employing four men.

Media related to Memorials to relatives of sculptor Robert Mawer at Wikimedia Commons

== Career ==
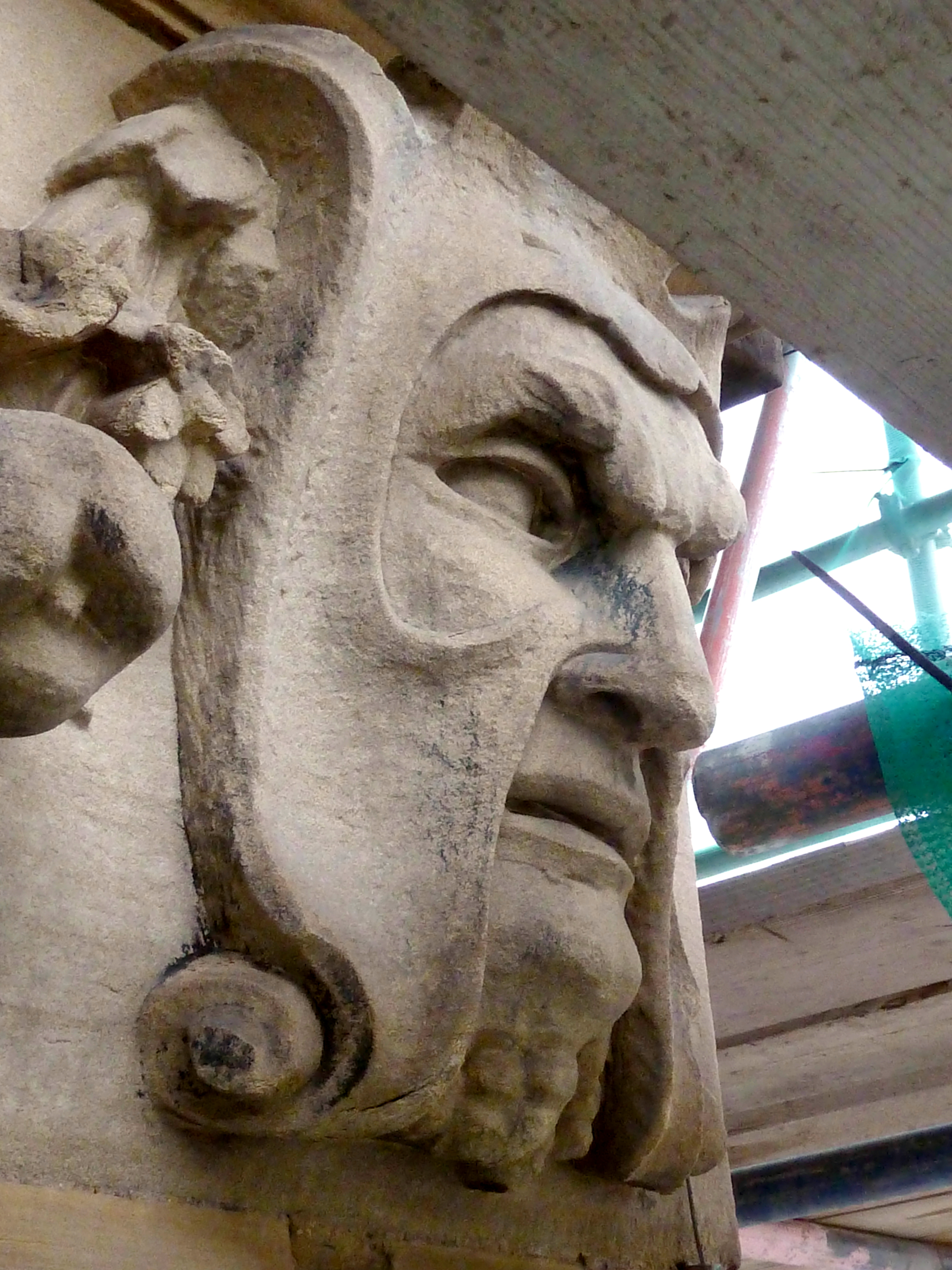
Portrait of Mawer (ca.1854) by his wife Catherine

If Mawer's apprenticeship as a stone carver was served between the ages of fourteen and twenty-one years as per tradition, he would have been qualified to work as a top sculptor from about 1828. It is not known where he served his apprenticeship, but since he was born in Nidderdale and married in Ripley, it is possible that he was apprenticed to a master stone carver at Ripon Cathedral where he could have gained the skills and knowledge that he used in all his works and taught to his apprentices. No documentary attributions for work have been found until 1837, so he was possibly working for another sculptor between 1828 and 1837. He was active as an architectural sculptor in the Gothic Revival and Neoclassical styles from at least 1837 until his death. However he does not appear in trade directories until 1848. From an unknown date until 1842, Mawer was a partner in Collitt & Co, stonemasons of Leeds, with Hugh Collitt and George Hope. The Leeds Times described him in his obituary as follows:

"One who was extensively known and much respected in this town. Mr Robert Mawer was a man eminent in his department as an architectural sculptor. The manner in which he acquitted himself in connection with the rebuilding of our beautiful Parish Church gave promise of his capabilities. As a "medieval sculptor" specimens of his work are to be seen in the numerous church screens, fonts and other forms of ecclesiastical decoration which he has executed in various parts of the kingdom. During the last few years of his life he devoted himself more to classic architecture, and his excellence in this department is evident in such buildings as St George's Hall, Bradford; The Leeds and Yorkshire Assurance Company's offices in Leeds; and the Unitarian Chapel, Leeds."

Leeds Civic Trust arranged to unveil a blue plaque At the Henry Moore Institute on 11 July 2019, commemorating the work of Robert Mawer, Catherine Mawer and William Ingle. This plaque was to be affixed to Moorlands House, Albion Street, Leeds, at a later date.

== Death ==
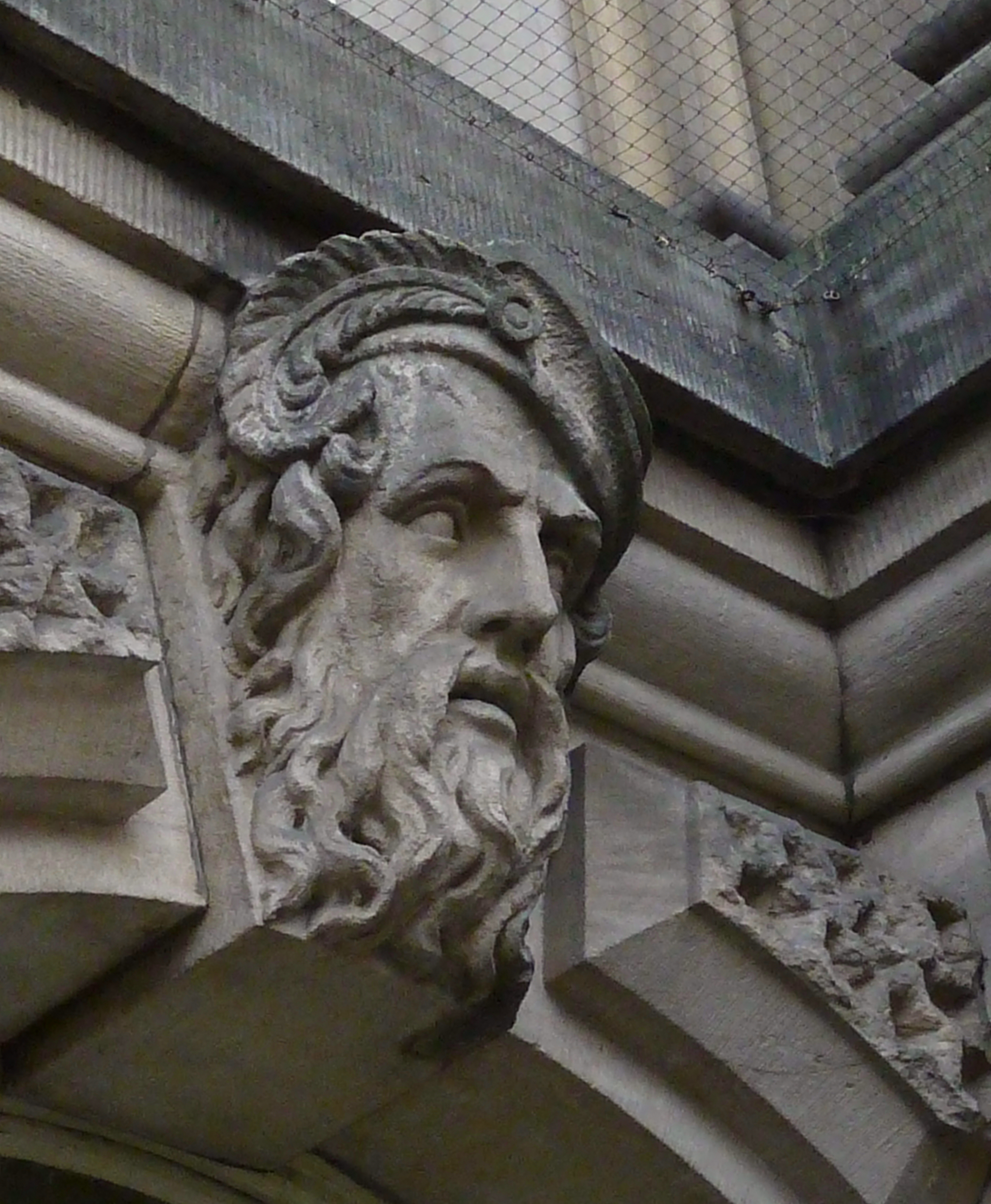
Keystone head of Mawer with feather in his cap (ca.1854) by his wife Catherine

He died on 10 November 1854, of chronic bronchitis, aged 47 years, at Oxford Place. His nephew William Ingle, who was then living at 1 Oxford Row, Leeds, was in attendance. He is buried with his wife Catherine in the churchyard of St Mark's Church, Woodhouse, Leeds, where he is commemorated with a memorial carved by Catherine.

Media related to Mawer memorial at Wikimedia Commons

== Works ==
The other top sculptors in his stone yard, who contributed to work attributed to Robert, were his wife Catherine Mawer and his nephew William Ingle, who both continued to run the stone yard after Robert died. His young apprentices were his son Charles Mawer, and Charles' contemporaries Matthew Taylor and Benjamin Payler; all three later formed their own careers as top sculptors. His final works on buildings which were formally opened after his death, for example Leeds Town Hall, were attributed to his wife Catherine, who completed those works. The following list of works from 1837 until his death in 1854, is limited to those attributed to him by name, in contemporary newspapers and other documents, such as the attribution for work at St Paul, Manningham.

=== St Peter's, Leeds (Leeds Minster), 1837-1841 ===
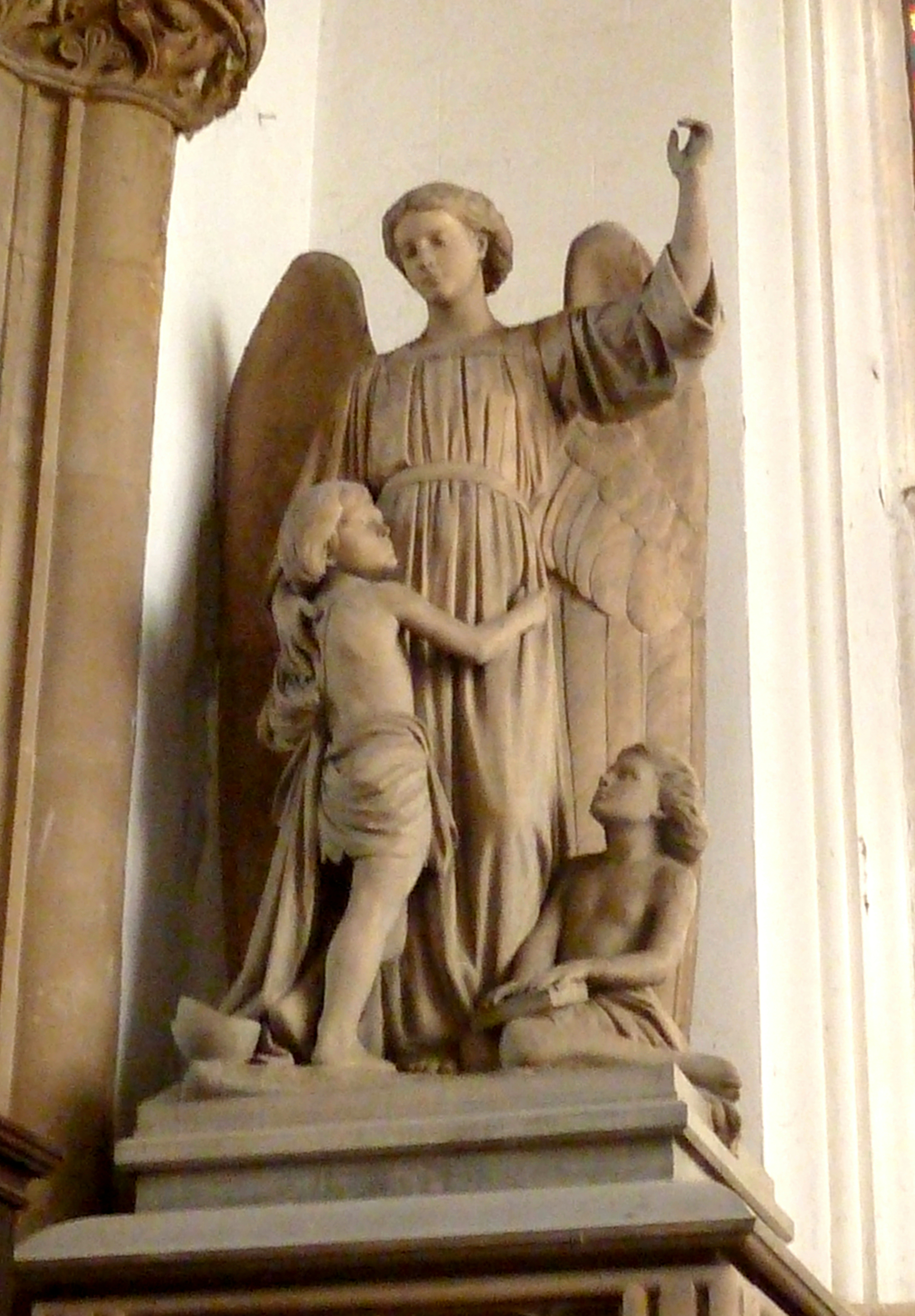
Beckett memorial (1849)

This is a Grade I listed building. The foundation stone of Leeds Minster, formerly St Peter's or Leeds parish church, was laid in 1837, and it was consecrated on 2 September 1841. It was designed by Robert Dennis Chantrell. Robert Mawer executed the general carving of the building, and this work "gave promise of his capabilities." He also produced the memorial to Christopher Beckett, designed by John Dobson, and completed in February 1849. "The whole of the work is of the very best description, the utmost attention having been paid to detail, and the carving will bear comparison with any of the ancient models."

In 1838, Chantrell's men found a Saxon cross in the church:

"When the [previous] Parish Church was taken down, in 1838, the fragments of crosses found there (with the exception of the large [thirteen feet in height] cross taken to London by Mr Chantrell) were removed to the yard of Mr Mawer, stone sculptor, Leeds, from whose widow these valuable relics were obtained a few days since [in January 1857], by Mr Denny, for the Museum of the Philosophical Hall. These fragments lay upon the table during the meeting ..." (Leeds Intelligencer and Leeds Mercury 24 January 1857)

The cross taken away by Chantrell was rescued from his garden after he died in 1875, and was re-erected in Leeds parish church. Around 1838, Chantrell gave a lecture about the remaining fragments of crosses, which were then "carried away by cartloads" by the public. It appears that all or some of these were found in Mawer's stone yard that same year, and are now in Leeds City Museum. There is another version of the story in which the stones found in Mawer's stoneyard were pieces of the cross which had been in Chantrell's garden. At least three pieces found at St Peter's, probably originally of the same cross, are in Leeds Museum, and some pieces have been lost.

Media related to Leeds Parish Church at Wikimedia Commons

=== Holy Trinity, Queen's Head (Queensbury), West End, Bradford, 1843−1845 ===
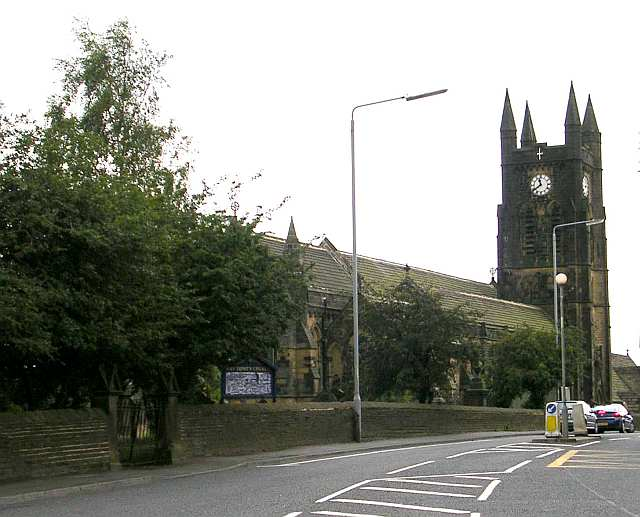
Holy Trinity

This is a Grade II listed building in Queensbury, Bradford. It was designed by James Mallinson, and the foundation stone was laid on Monday 17 April 1843. The building was consecrated on Friday 29 August 1845.

It has a "3-light east window with enriched clustered colonnettes, surmounted by well-carved angels, a beast and a bird ... 2-bay tower arcade with well carved life-sized angel in octofoiled opening over." and was restored in 1885 by T.H. and F. Healey. Mallinson and Healey were employing Mawer for their neo-gothic carving in the 1840s, but the authorship of these carvings is yet unconfirmed.

Media related to Holy Trinity Church, Queensbury, West Yorkshire at Wikimedia Commons

=== Church of St Paul and St Jude, Manningham, 1846−1848 ===
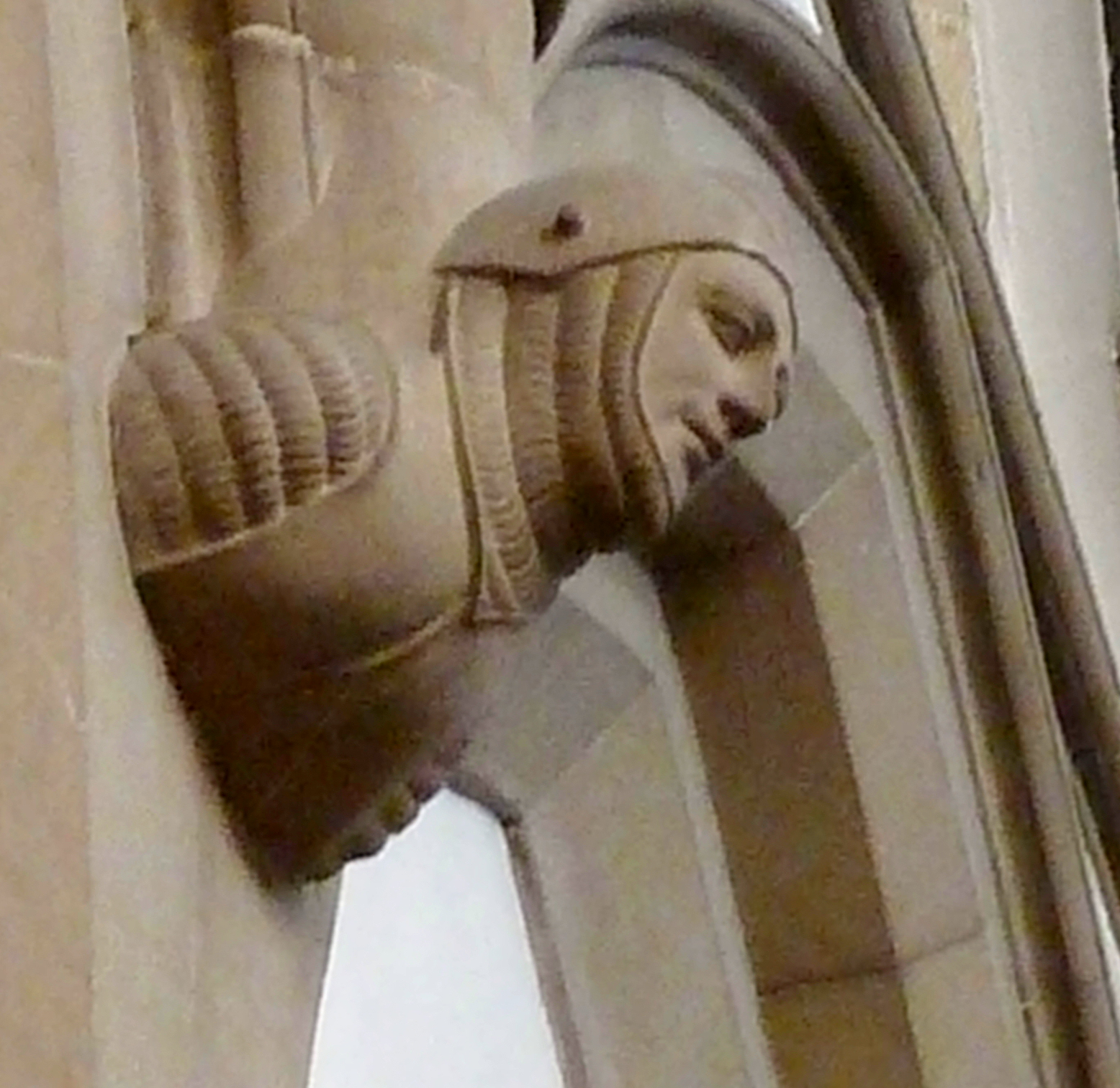
Label stop in style of ship's figurehead

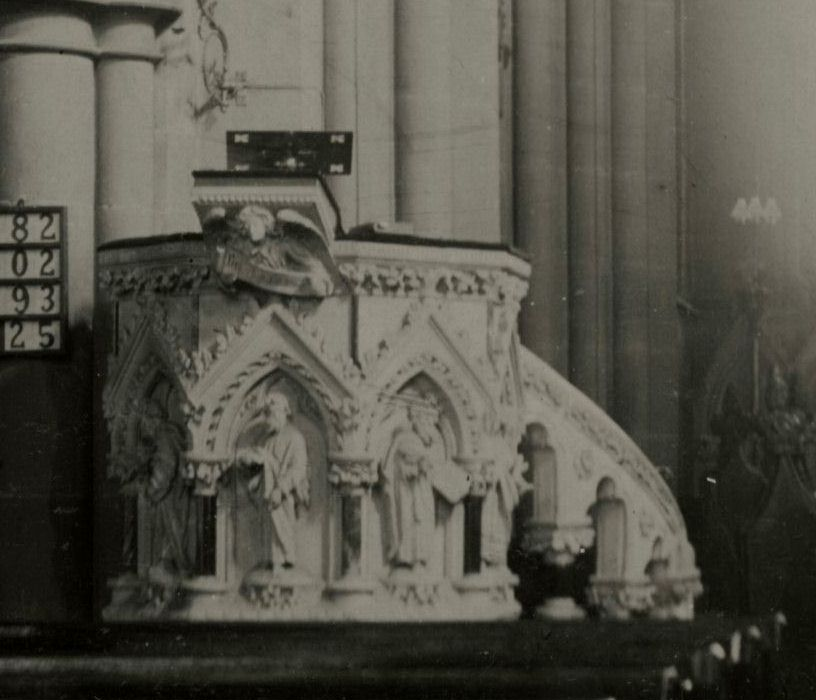
Original pulpit carved by Mawer

This is a Grade II listed building. The foundation stone of St Paul's was laid on 3 November 1846 in Manningham, Bradford, and the building was consecrated on 2 October 1848. The architects were Mallinson and Healey. When Mawer carved the label stops and corbels of the building in the form of heads, he and William Ingle were already "Mallinson and Healey's favourite stone masons". Mawer carved the original font and pulpit, however the pulpit was replaced in 1960 by one of oak, and the font has been painted in beige gloss.

The Bradford Observer described the arcade in the nave, and the font, in 1848:

"The drip stones or labels terminate in busts of various designs, and most admirably carved, the work of Mr Mawer, of Leeds, who also executed the font. These busts support banded shafts which bear the trusses of the roof... The font which stands near the second pier from the west on the south side of the nave, is of Early English design. It is circular and rests on five detached shafts. The bowl is arcaded, in the heads of which are evangelistic emblems (an eagle, emblem of St John; and ox, emblem of St Luke; a lion, symbol of St Mark; and a man, symbol of St Matthew), and heads. The cover is of oak, and ornamented with iron scroll work."

Media related to Saint Paul Church (Manningham, Bradford) at Wikimedia Commons

=== Mill Hill Unitarian Chapel, Leeds, 1847-1848 ===
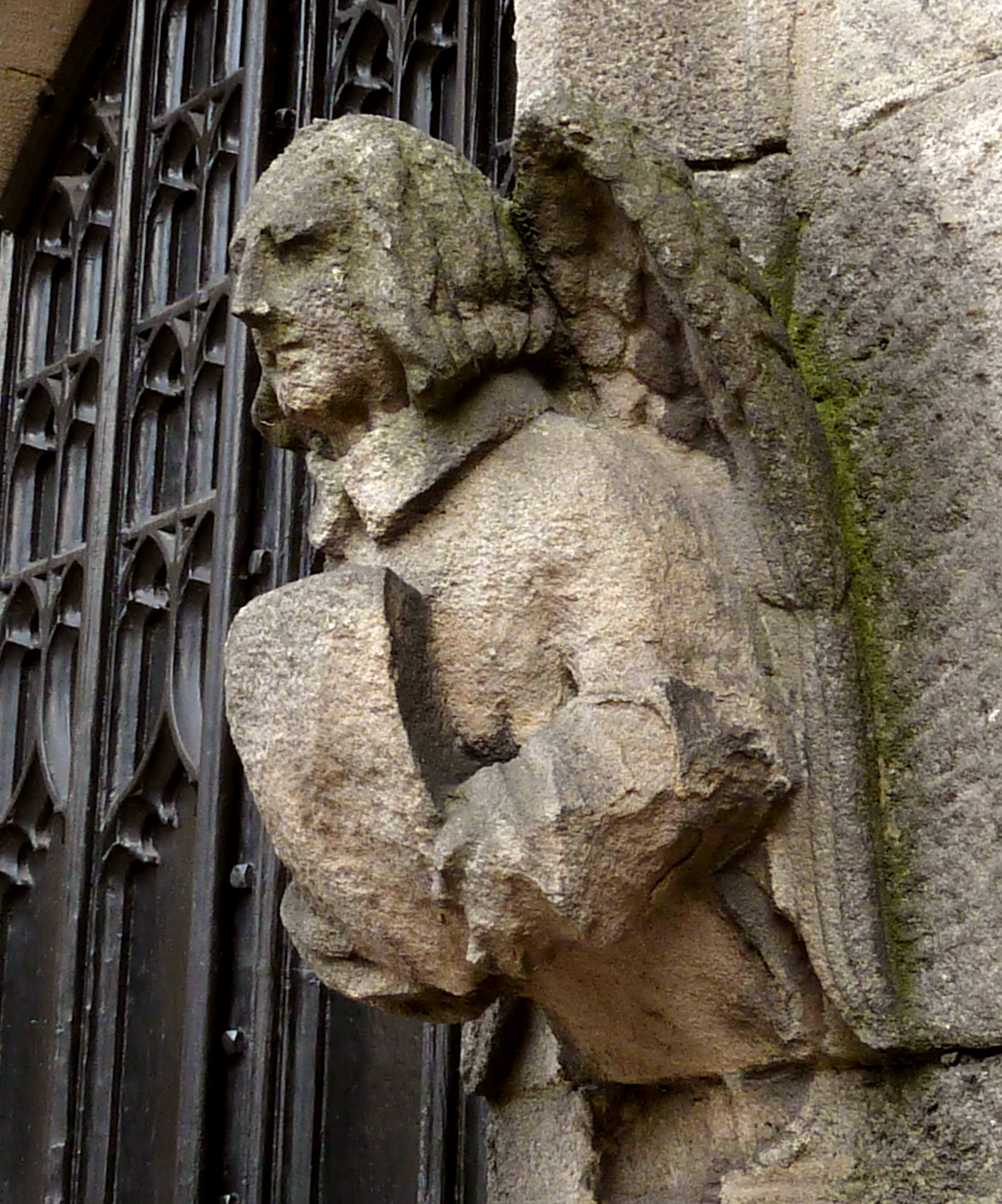
Winged man label stop on east porch

Mill Hill Chapel is a Grade II* listed building in Leeds City Square, opened on 27 December 1848, and designed by architects Bowman & Crowther of Manchester. Robert Mawer executed the original stone carving.

At the opening in 1848, the Preston Chronicle described the carved elements thus:

"There are no tiebeams, but the roofs are strengthened by carved pieces of timber, which meet in the centre and form pointed arches supported on carved stone corbels. The seats ... [have] standards terminated with what are technically called "poppy heads" of different designs. The pulpit is placed on the east side of the chancel arch, close to the pillar. It is octagonal in form, decorated with shafts and arches, and is of stone."

The English Heritage Grade II* listing specifies:

"... an arch-braced roof with angels carved on the brackets, and stone corbels also carved with angels. The nave has original pews with crocketed finials ... pulpit of Caen stone on the west side."

The Mill Hill Chapel replaced a previous Mill Hill Chapel which stood on Park Row, Leeds, between 1672 and 1847. Two of its pillars were removed to Meanwood Park and re-erected there. The present Mill Hill chapel was affected by fire following an air raid on 14 March 1941.

Media related to Mill Hill Unitarian Chapel, Leeds at Wikimedia Commons

=== Church of St Matthew, Bankfoot, Bradford, 1848–1849 ===
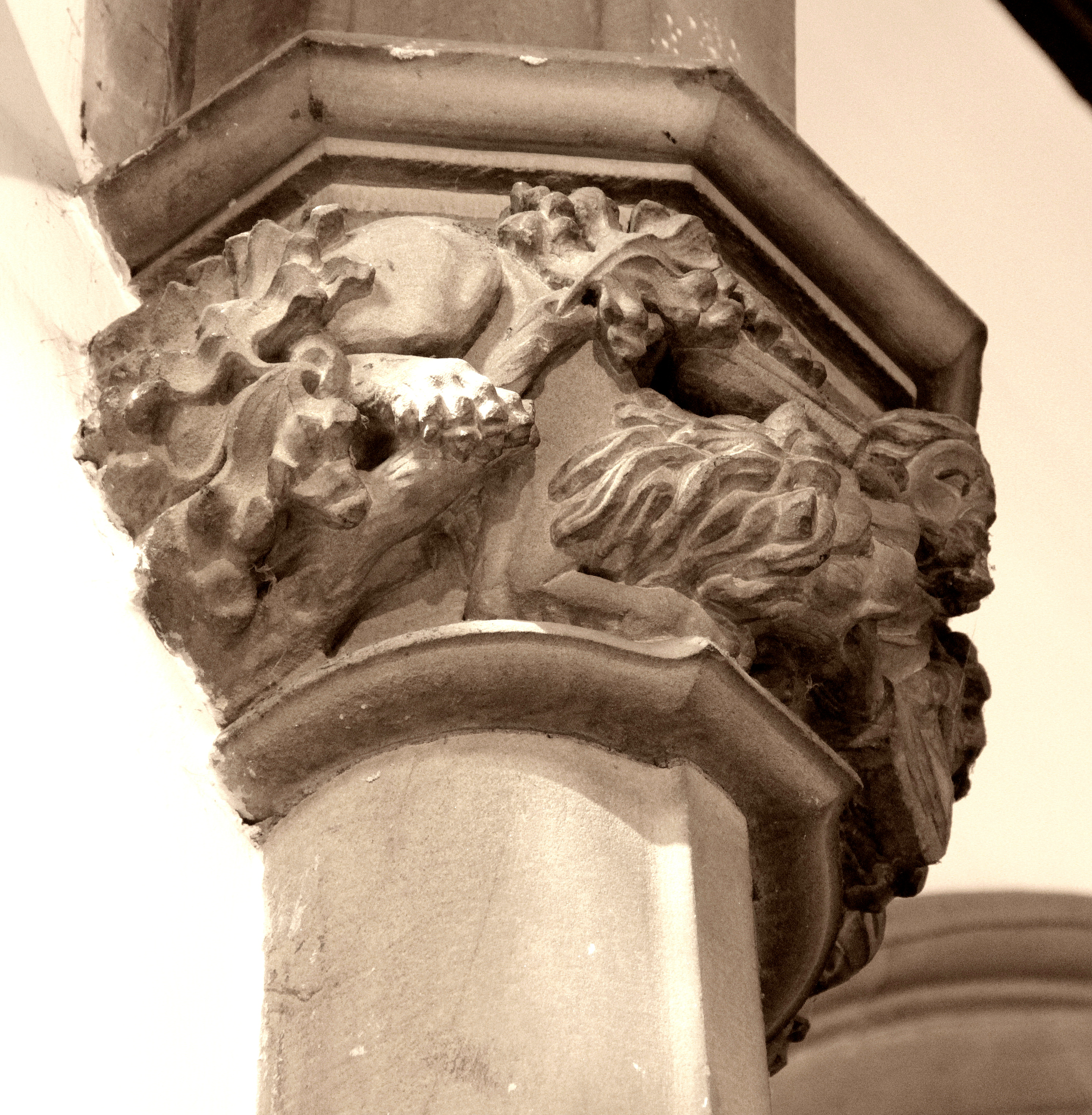
Romanesque-style capital with half-hidden lion

This is a Grade II listed building on Carr Bottom Road, Bradford, West Yorkshire, designed by Mallinson & Healey of Bradford. The foundations stone was laid on 13 September 1848, and the church was consecrated on Wednesday 12 December 1849.

The Bradford Observer said in 1849:

"The font (very similar to the one in S. Mary Magdalene, Oxford), which is placed near to the West end of the Nave, is in keeping with the architecture of the church, which is flowing decorated, and is extremely beautiful both as to design and execution. Its form is octagonal, and each face filled with rich flowing tracery, similar to the windows of the North and south aisles. On its base or lowest member the following legend is carved in ancient letters: "Armee de foi hardi." The whole stands on a broad step, having a projection on the West for the use of the officiating minister. It is large enough for immersion, is lined with lead, and has a water drain. It is of Caen stone, and together with all the carved work of the church, from the chisel of Mr Mawer of Leeds, of whose skill in this branch of ecclesiastical decoration it were needless to speak whilst such specimens of this, and many others scattered up and down the country, remain to testify."

The font is now lost, having disappeared from the church precincts during the re-ordering clear-out of 2010. The altar, the carved wooden pulpit, altar rails and pews (all by Ives of Shipley), the brass eagle lectern and other artefacts have been removed; however Ives' carved wooden reredos and Mawer's carvings on the building itself remain. At the consecration the Leeds Intelligencer reported:

Over the inner doorway of the porch as we enter, the following text is carved on the face of the arch in the old church letter: "They that wait upon the Lord shall renew their strength." [In the chancel] the capitals are floreated and decorated with foliage interspersed with figures. The carving on the N. capital represents Sampson and Delilah, and on the S. David with the lion's jaw.

Media related to St Matthew, Bankfoot, Bradford at Wikimedia Commons

=== St Michael and All Angels, Shelf, Halifax, 1849–1850 ===
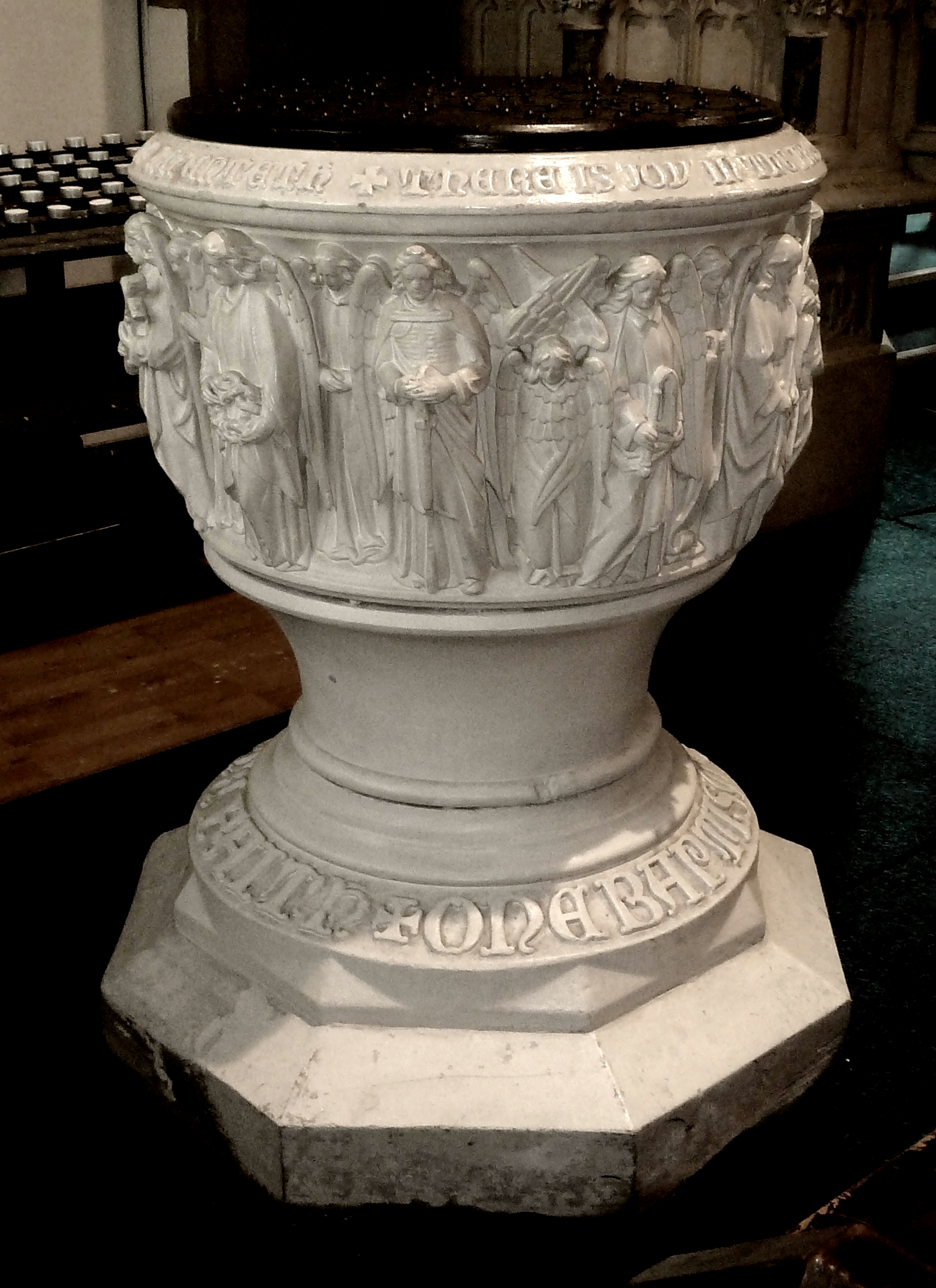
Font with crowd of carved angels at St Michael's

This building, designed by James Mallinson and Thomas Healey, is not listed. It is in Carr House Road, Shelf, West Yorkshire, between Bradford and Halifax. The foundation stone was laid on 27 February 1849, and the building was consecrated on 11 June 1850 by the Bishop of Ripon.

According to the Morning Post in 1850: The four windows on the north side have "dripstones terminating in well-carved heads." On the porch, the "dripstone of the outer archway terminates in the head of a bishop and a queen." The three lights of the east window are "terminated with a dripstone resting on well-carved heads." In the nave, the roof trusses "spring from shafts resting upon carved heads and arched braces." The inner chancel arch "rests upon corbel shafts with floriated capitals." In the chancel "the roof is similar to the nave, except that the space above the collar is filled in with foliations. The doorway into the vestry is beneath a depressed pointed arch, whose dripstone rests upon carved heads."

"The font, which is circular, has carved upon it various angels, in harmony with the dedication of the church, which is to St Michael and All Angels. Around the upper limb of the font is this inscription - Likewise I say unto you there is joy in heaven over one sinner that repenteth. On its base is the following legend, One Lord, one Faith, one Baptism. It has a flat cover, ornamental, with rich iron scroll work. Altogether, this font, as to its design by the architects, and its execution by Mr Mawer of Leeds, is one of the most satisfactory we have seen for a length of time. We strongly recommend Mr Mawer to the notice of all church builders." (Morning Post, 24 June 1850)

However the building now has "upgraded facilities", and the label stops on the porch are now missing.

Media related to St Michael and All Angels Church, Shelf at Wikimedia Commons

=== St Mary the Virgin, Quarry Hill, Leeds, restoration 1850 ===
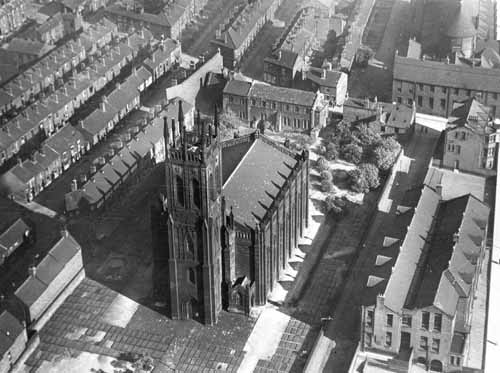
St Mary in 1945

St Mary's was a large church designed by local architect Thomas Taylor with tower and clock on St Mary's street, Quarry Hill, Leeds. It was demolished in 1979. The foundation stone of this "massive Gothic hall church with aisles as high as the nave" was laid on 29 January 1823. It was completed in 1826, and consecrated on 12 October of the same year by the Archbishop of York It cost £12,520 to build, using stone from Bramley and Horsforth quarries. The Ripon and Leeds Diocesan Office is now on the site of the nave. Part of the graveyard remains.

The church had repairs and alterations in 1850, when the font and pulpit were carved by Robert Mawer. The Leeds Intelligencer said: "The font and Reredos screen are of Caen stone, of most elaborate design (but the carving of the screen is not yet completed); these are from the chisel of that master of his art, Mr. Robert Mawer, of Leeds.

Media related to Former Church of St Mary, Quarry Hill, Leeds at Wikimedia Commons

=== Church of St Mary the Virgin, Gomersal, 1850-1851 ===
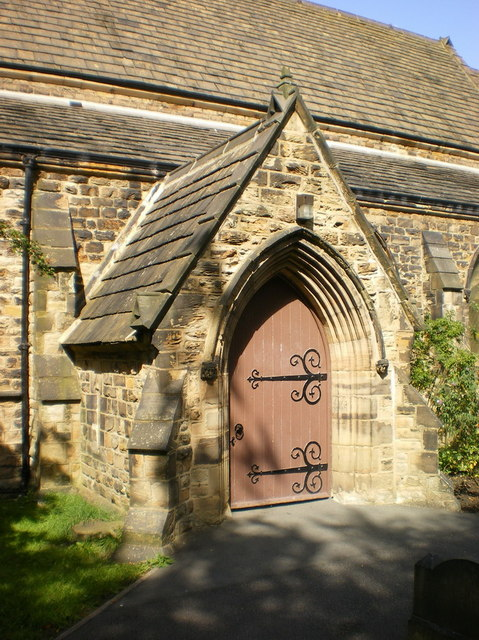
Porch with label stops

This building is Grade II listed. It was designed by John Dobson of Leeds. The foundation stone was laid on 1 January 1850. Robert Mawer executed the pulpit, font and reredos.

"The chancel arch has moulded piers and capitals, having carved on them, on the north side, emblems of the Passion, and on the south, Angels carrying musical instruments ... The pulpit, font and reredos are of Caen stone, carved by Mr Mawer of Leeds, of whose work, as it is unnecessary to speak, so it is impossible to speak too highly ...The reredos contains five compartments, within which will be emblazoned the Creed, the Lord's Prayer, and the Ten Commandments." (Leeds Intelligencer, 1 February 1851)

At the consecration on Tuesday 25 March 1851, the Leeds Intelligencer remarked:

"The font and Reredos screen are of Caen stone, of most elaborate design (but the carving of the screen is not yet completed); these are from the chisel of that master of his art, Mr. Robert Mawer, of Leeds."

The English Heritage listing description includes the following:

"[Exterior:] Openwork parapet and tall crocketted pinnacles on corbel brackets of figure heads and beasts. Gargoyles ... Interior: 6-bay arcade of double chamfered arches on octagonal piers. Moulded chancel arch on clustered piers with capitals of carved angels. Carved stone reredos with crocketted heads and pinnacles with crests. Carved stone font."

The building was completely refurbished internally in 2003.

Media related to St Mary the Virgin, Gomersal at Wikimedia Commons

=== St Catherine, Barmby Moor, restoration 1851−1852 ===
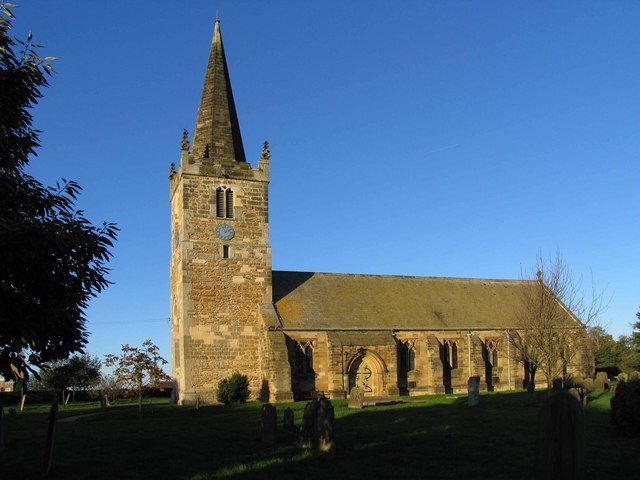
St Catherine's

This is a Grade II* listed building, on Main Street, Barmby Moor, East Yorkshire. The original church once had a Norman or Saxon plinth, and "windows of the thirteenth, fourteenth and fifteenth centuries". The tower, which survives, was last rebuilt at the end of the fifteenth century.

The nave and chancel were entirely rebuilt, and the tower given minor repairs, in 1851−1852 by Robert Dennis Chantrell. Historic England describes the font as a "C14 octagonal font on octagonal base with pyramidal stops;" that is to say, it is not Mawer's work. However, at the re-opening on 15 April 1852, the Yorkshire Gazette says: "The carved work in stone is by Mawer of Leeds ... The font is not yet placed, but a rich flooring is laid for its reception, and plans have been approved for an octagon font of the decorative style." The carved stone "flory cross finial", on the chancel gable, is by Mawer.

Media related to St Catherine's Church, Barmby Moor at Wikimedia Commons

=== Church of St James, Boroughbridge, 1851−1852 ===
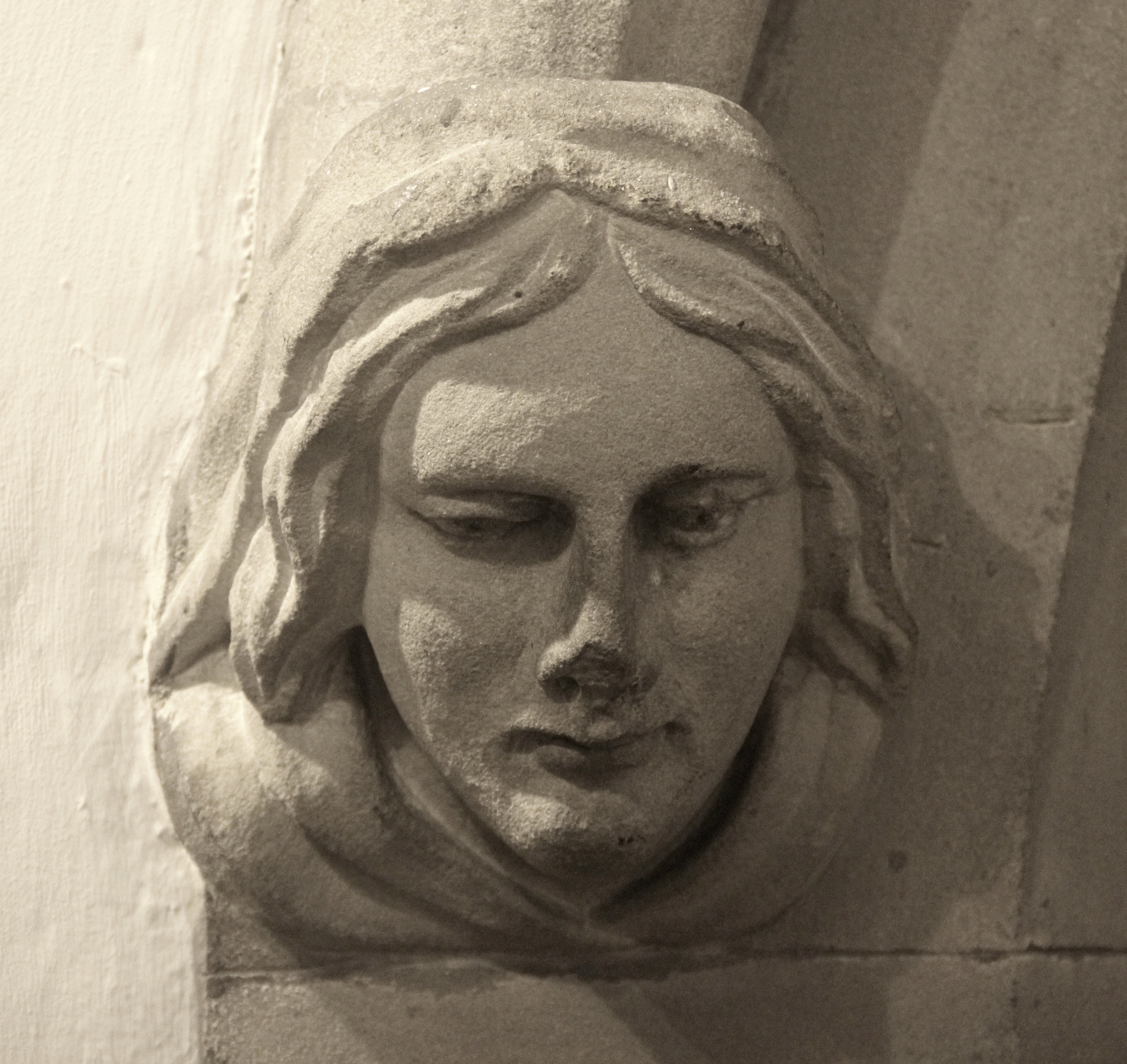
Label stop in nave: portrait of Catherine

This is a Grade II listed building. It was designed by architects James Mallinson (1819−1884) and Thomas Healey (1809-1862), and completed in 1852. The foundation stone was laid on Thursday 12 June 1851, and the church was consecrated on Tuesday 27 July 1852. This church site is significant in that it is in the area where Robert and Catherine Mawer, and William Ingle, were born. Most of the local inhabitants turned out for the foundation ceremony, which included in its procession all those contracted to work on the building, "(forty in number) carrying banners with appropriate mottoes." Afterwards, "the workmen, with the ringers and singers, sat down to a dinner of roast beef and plum pudding."

Robert Mawer executed the general carving of the church, including the font, and Mawer & Ingle returned in 1864 work to carve the reredos (now missing). The architectural critic C.P. Canfield deprecates the church architecture, saying:

"The church interior is stark for the five-bay aisle arcades are formed of the most uniform of double-flat-chamfered arches supported on quatrefoil piers entirely without embellishments save only for head labels stops at the ends. Ascribed to Mawer and Ingle of Leeds, who were frequently patronised by Healey, they offered no scope for the firm to enhance their reputation, but if the poor little font is theirs also, as stated by the notes in the church, then surely one of their apprentices must have been delegated the work."

However, at the consecration the Yorkshire Gazette said: "The handsome new font of Caen stone does credit to Mr Mawer of Leeds, by whom the corbels and interior carving were executed." On the same occasion, the Leeds Intelligencer said: "There is a handsome [carved wooden] eagle, or lectern, which, with the [stone] font and carved work generally, has been executed by Mr Mawer, of Leeds, whose well-earned reputation it is calculated to enhance." Regarding the 1884 reredos, the Yorkshire Gazette said:

"The reredos recently erected in this church is chiefly of Caen stone, marble being used to a small extent in the shafts. The style is that of the church, Decorated Gothic. Each wing of the reredos, to the right and left of the altar table, is divided into three compartments by shafts of serpentine marble, in which the green veins predominate. The shafts have carved stone capitals, which support well-moulded arches, each supported with foliage. The spandrels of these arches are filled with bands of rosettes in low relief. The central portion of the reredos, immediately behind the altar table, is projected and divided into three compartments. The shafts, instead of springing from the floor, as do those on each side, stand on bases level with the table. They are of serpentine marble, and support arches more elaborately carved than the side arches. In the centre compartment is sculptured "The Lamb," bearing over its shoulder a banner and cross. The two remaining compartments contain panels, having the monograms "I.H.C." and "X.P.C.," signifying the sacred name, Jesus Christ. The grounds of these compartments are richly covered. The cornice of the reredos is ornamented with carved ears of corn, grapes, leaves &c. This exquisite piece of work has been most creditably and satisfactorily executed by Messrs. Mawer & Ingle, carvers, from designs of Messrs. T.H. and F. Healey, architects, Bradford. The roof of the chancel has also been painted a beautiful sky blue, and freely ornamented with stars."(Yorkshire Gazette and Leeds Intelligencer)

In 1954 the vicar obtained a faculty to destroy the reredos, and to remove the painted writing over the arches and along the south aisle wall, although that writing may still exist under the present paint. Medieval carvings from the earlier church were installed in the vestry wall in 1852. A chair from the old church is also in the vestry, and a chair and table from the earlier church are in the nave. The 1861 west window made by Hughes of London and dedicated to Canon Robert Deaville Owen (1823−1904), features the Apostles James, Paul and Peter.

Media related to St. James' Church, Boroughbridge at Wikimedia Commons

=== St George's Hall, Bradford, 1849-1853 ===
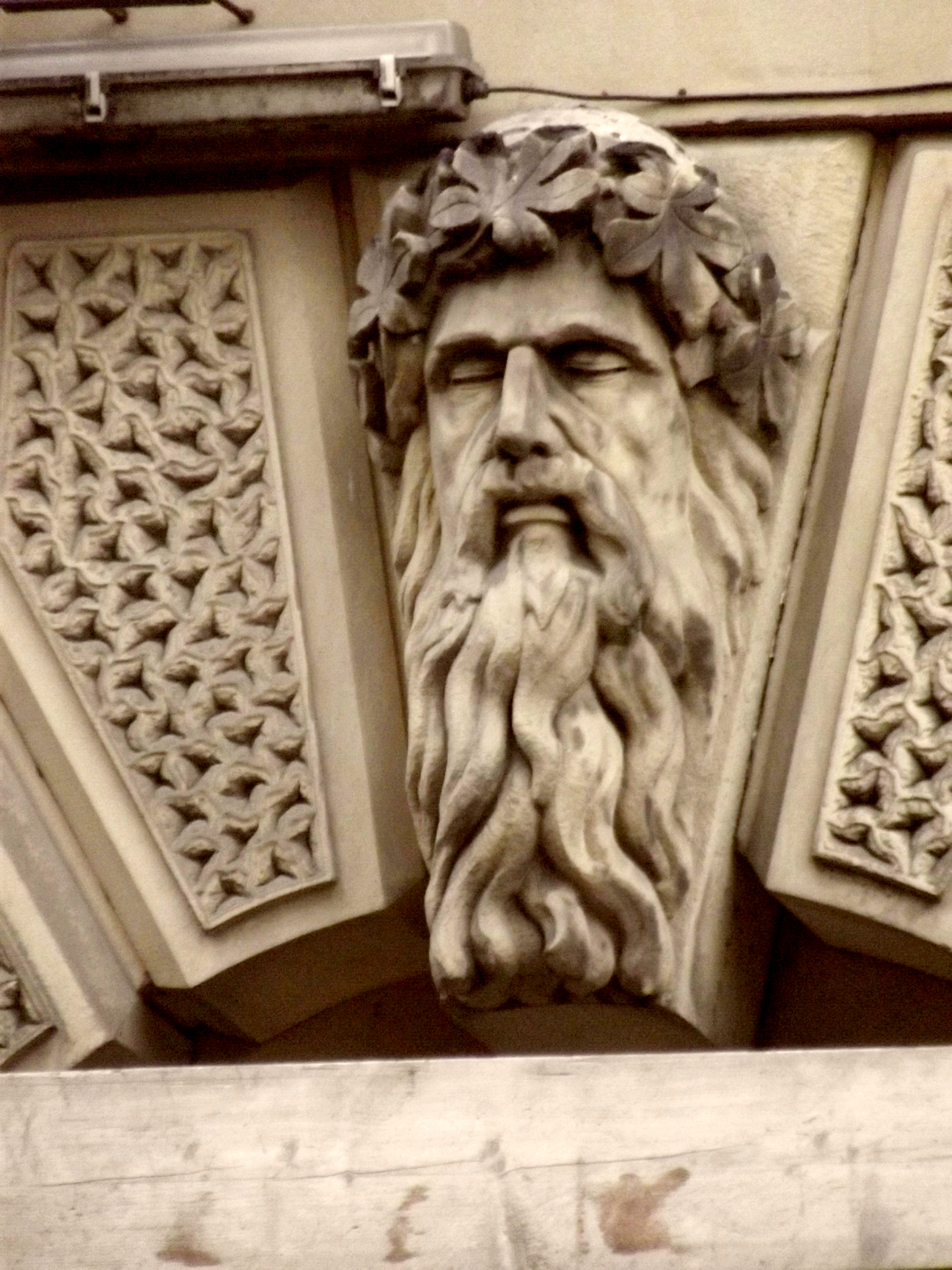
Head by Robert Mawer on St George's Hall

This is a Grade II* listed building, designed by Henry Francis Lockwood and William Mawson. Ground was broken in 1851, and the hall was opened on Wednesday 31 August 1853. The Bradford Observer described the carving thus:

"The centres of the arches over the doorways are enriched with masks executed by Yorkshire artists ... The upper parts of the intercolumniations are occupied with circular shields in stone bordered with wreaths of oak leaves. The south side elevation [has] elaborately carved festoons of fruit and flowers. ... the carved stone work [is] by Mr Mawer stone mason ... of Leeds"(Bradford Observer 1 September 1853)

The London Daily News and York Herald mention "festoons of flowers beautifully carved." in 1851, Mawer's fee was estimated at £270. The hall cost about £25,000, and opened with a three-day music festival, which overwhelmed the town's accommodation and transport with large numbers of nobility and other visitors.

Media related to St George's Hall, Bradford at Wikimedia Commons

=== Former St Andrew, Listerhills Road, North Horton, 1853 ===
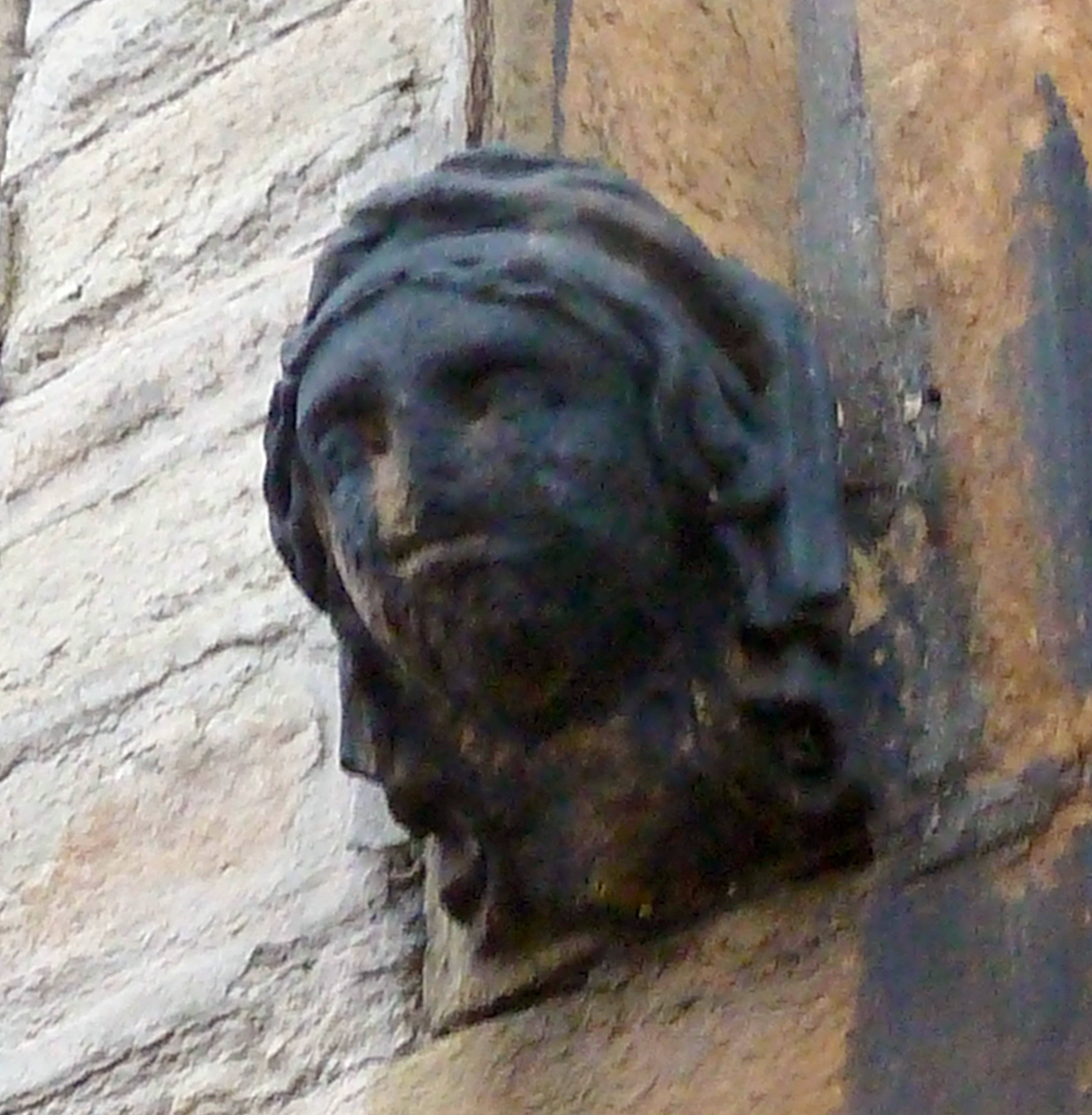
Fire-damaged head on former St Andrews School

The spire of St Andrew's church was a landmark, sited in Listerhills Road, North Horton, Bradford. It was designed by Mallinson & Healey, consecrated by the Bishop of Ripon on Wednesday 28 September 1853, and demolished in 1971. At the consecration, the Bradford Observer reported: "The pulpit and font are of stone, elaborately carved by Mr Mawer of Leeds." The Leeds Intelligencer said: "The porch has an arch with hanging tracery, resting on clustered shafts with carved capitals ... Externally, all the gables have copings and [carved stone] crosses."

St Andrew's was next door to the site of St Andrews School, built in 1857−1858. The school was also designed by Mallinson & Healey, and like the church it had Mawer carvings on the porch. The former school was destroyed by fire on 26 December 2009, and as of 2016 was in ruins at the corner of Listerhills Road and St Andrews Place, Bradford BD7. The school was until demolition a Grade II listed building. In April 2017, the Keighley News reported that the school building had been demolished.

Media related to Former Church of st Andrew, Listerhills Road, Bradford at Wikimedia Commons
Media related to Former St Andrews School, Listerhills Road at Wikimedia Commons

=== St Mark, Woodhouse, Leeds, 1853 and 1856 ===
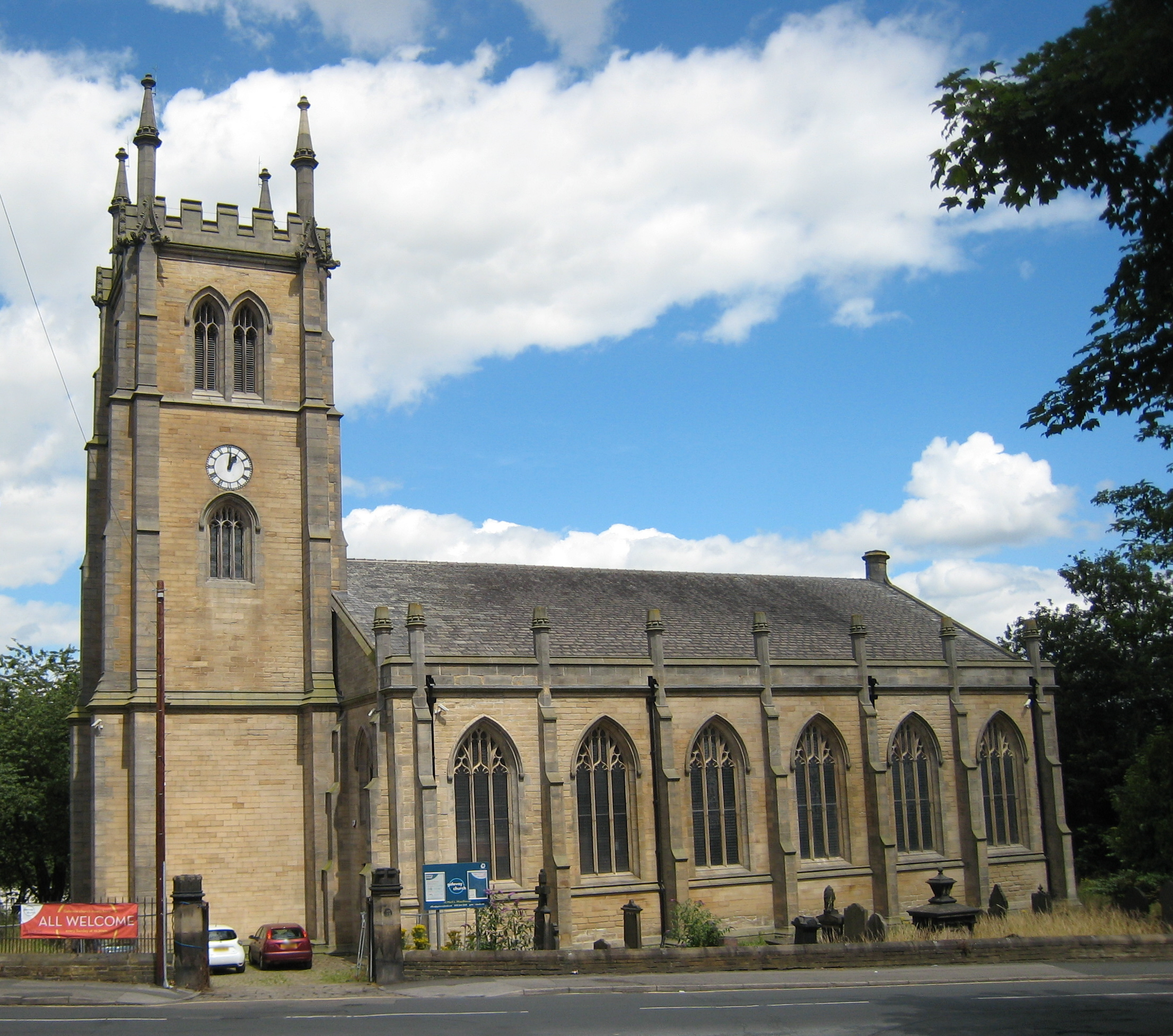
St Mark, Woodhouse

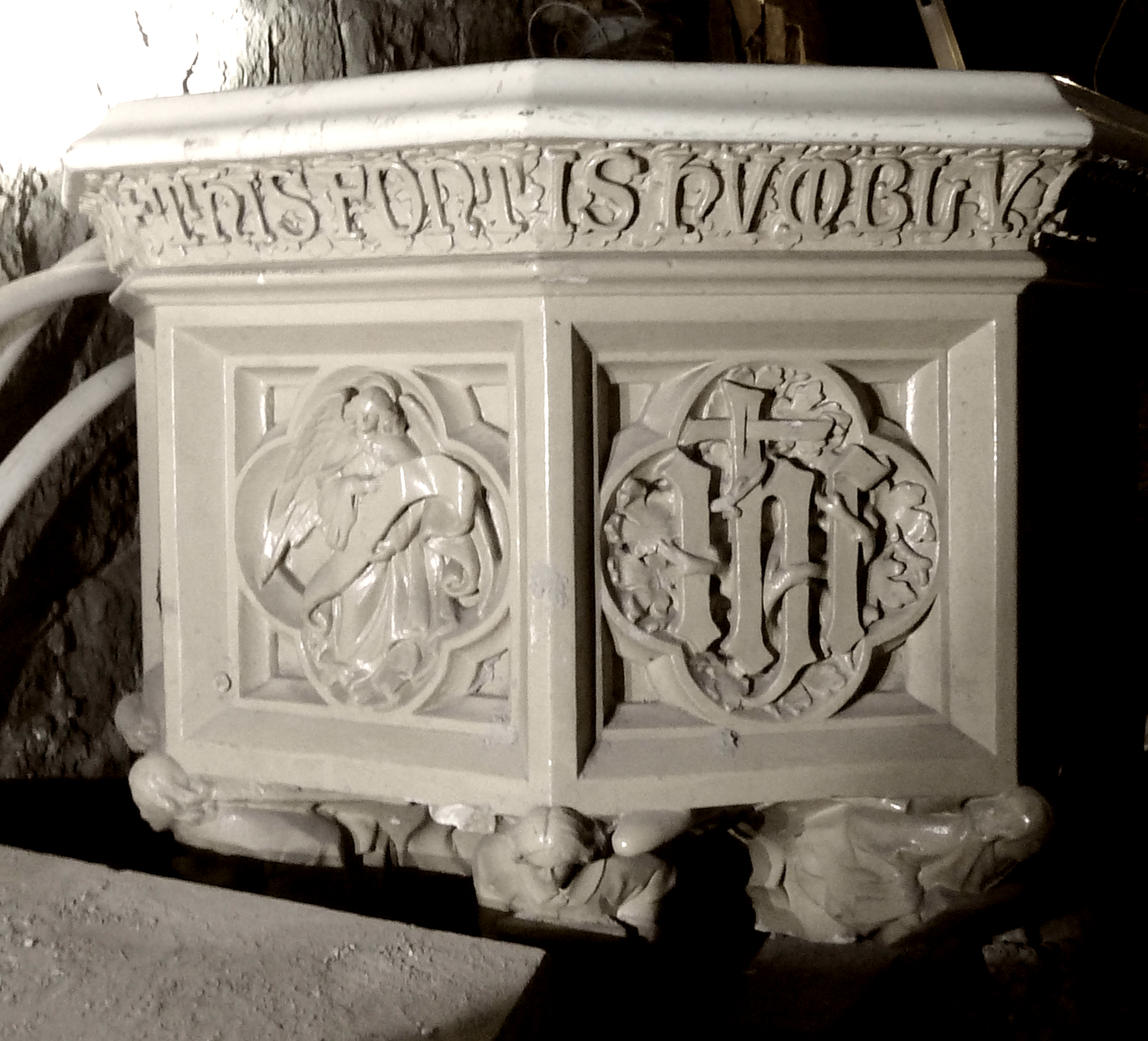
Mawer's dismantled font in the basement of St Mark's

This is a Grade II listed building, in Woodhouse, Leeds, West Yorkshire. It was designed by architects Peter Atkinson and Richard Hey Sharp in 1823, consecrated on 13 January 1826, and closed in 2001. It was bought by Gateway Church in 2008, and reopened on 5 June 2014. Prior to and during the refurbishment many of the contents were removed including the pulpit, organ and most of the pews. The font is dismantled and in storage within the building. Robert Mawer carved the font in 1853. The Leeds Intelligencer described the font thus:

"A very elaborately carved font of Caen stone has been erected ... It is of an octagonal shape, of the perpendicular style of architecture, so as to correspond with the church, designed by Cuthbert Brodrick, Esq., the architect of the New Town Hall, and executed by Mr Mawer of Oxford Place. On four alternate sides are the several emblems of the Four Evangelists, viz., the figure of an angel with a flying scroll - a lion, with wings - an ox, with wings - and a flying eagle, in allusion to the passage in the 1st of Ezekiel. The four intervening sides have the figure of a lamb carrying the cross with a scroll - the pelican feeding her young from her own breast - the cross, around which is the crown of thorns - and the monogram I.H.S. At the several corners are the figures of angels with blank shields. All the figures are deeply engraven, and the whole does great credit both to the designer and executor. Around the top is the name of the donor, in Old English characters upon a wreath of leaves, as follows: This font is humbly offered to the glory of God, by Charles Gascoyne Maclea - 1853 (Leeds Intelligencer 5 November 1853)

St Marks was used as a location in the TV series The Beiderbecke Affair. (Note: Mawer's font can be seen in close-up, standing in the nave of St Mark's, Woodhouse, in the 42nd minute of series 1, episode 3 of The Beiderbecke Trilogy)

Media related to St Mark, Woodhouse at Wikimedia Commons

=== Old Church of St John the Evangelist, New Wortley, Leeds, 1853 ===
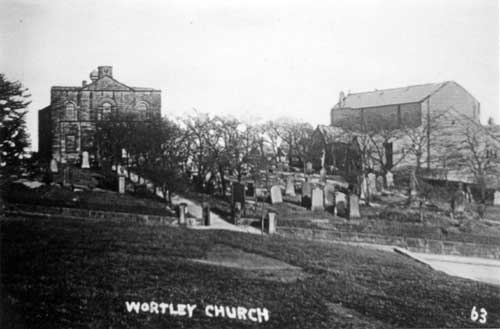
Old St John, Wortley, on the left, now demolished (new church on the right)

The old church of St John the Evangelist, New Wortley, Leeds, was designed with tower and spire by John Dobson of Leeds and consecrated in 1853. The building accommodated 650, and had a west window and transept windows of four lights each, plus an east window of five lights. All carving was credited to "Messrs Mawer & Whiteley of Leeds," although Whiteley was a stonemason. The United Kingdom Census 1851 records Thomas Whiteley, born in Birstall ca.1823, a stonemason employing eight stonemasons, living at 9 Bussey's Court, Woodhouse, Leeds, with his mother in law. A "handsome" reredos was added by Mawer & Ingle to John Dobson and Charles Chorley's design in 1865.

The old church was replaced with a new one built close by in 1898.

Media related to St John Wortley, archive images at Wikimedia Commons

=== Church of St Matthias, Burley, Leeds, 1853−1854 ===
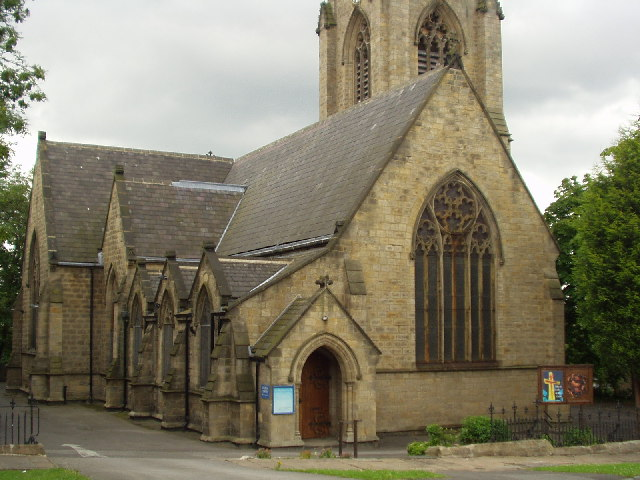
St Matthias, Burley

This is a Grade II* listed building, designed by Perkin and Backhouse of Leeds. The foundation stone was laid in February 1853, and the building was consecrated on Friday 10 November 1854.

The arches of the nave have carved bosses. They and the inscribed stone or tablet in the tower were carved by Mawer. The tablet says: "Saint Matthias Church, Burley. This church, built by subscription, was consecrated on the 10th day of November, 1854, an endowment of £150 per annum having been provided out of the bequest of the late Mrs. Jane Matthewman, formerly of Leeds, who died at Harrogate the first day of June 1848."

The Leeds Intelligencer reported in 1854 thus:

"The font is placed in the centre of a wide aisle at the entrance to the church, and is raised on two steps. It is elaborately carved. Its plan is octagonal, and each side has a well-relieved and moulded arched canopy, with sunk emblazoned panel, on which are written the following appropriate text: "One Lord," "One Faith," "One Baptism," "One God and Father of all." Around the bowl is the "Lily," and the canopies terminate with "Doves" and enriched bosses alternately. The stem is panelled and diapered, and each panel finishes with crochets. It is the gift of Charles Gascoigne Maclea Esq. ... The font, tablet, and all the carved work are of Caen stone, and have been executed by Mr Robert Mawer of this town.(Leeds Intelligencer, 11 November 1854)"

The building was altered and enlarged in 1886 to increase seating capacity from 450 to 650. As of 2017 the interior of the church had been recently reordered, with 19th century pews removed.

Media related to St. Matthias' Church, Burley, Leeds at Wikimedia Commons

=== Former St Stephen's, Burmantofts, 1853–1854 ===
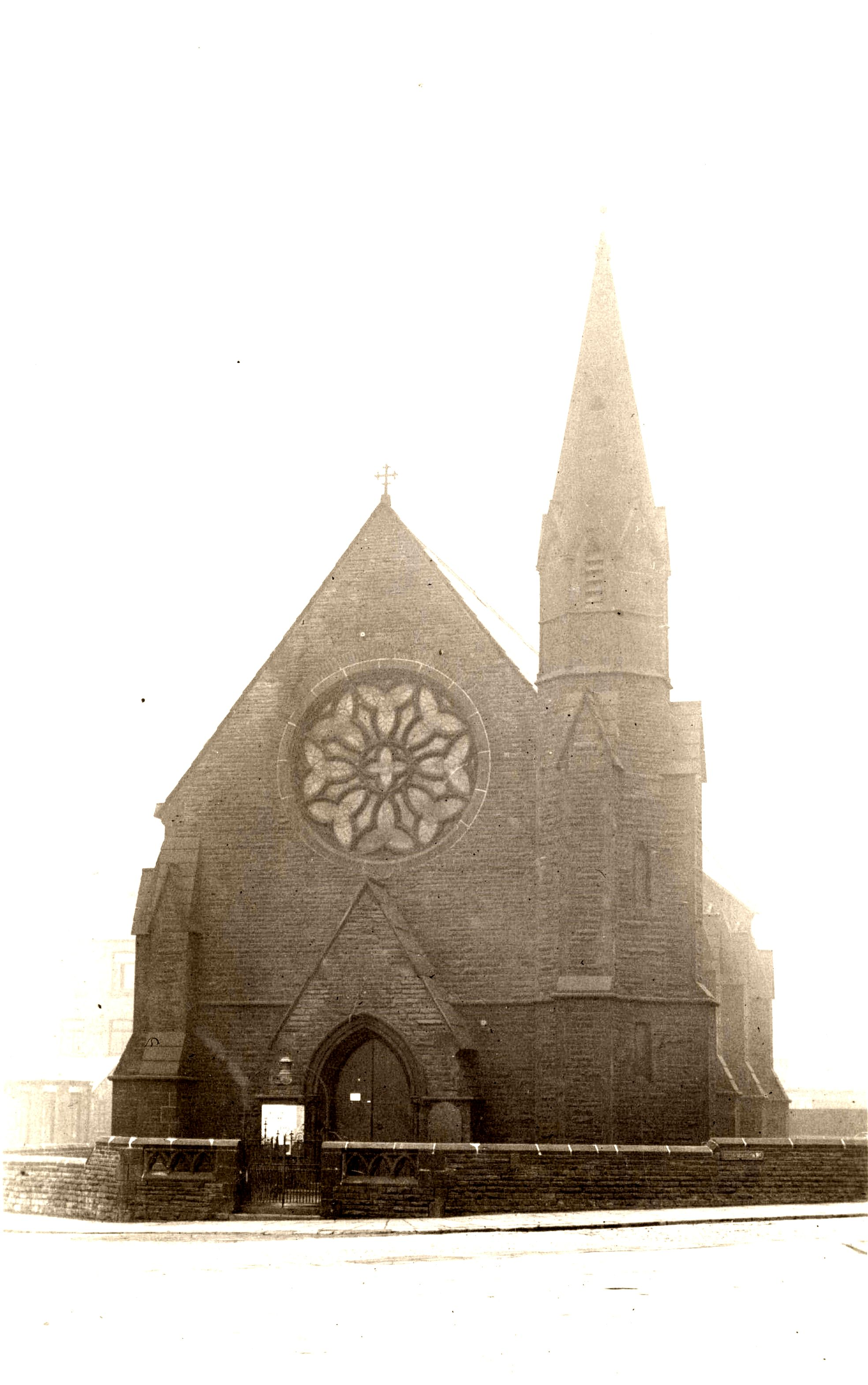
Former St Stephen's Burmantofts

This former church building in Accommodation Road and Nippet Lane, Burmantofts, was designed for a congregation of 605 by John Dobson "in the geometrical decorated style of Gothic architecture." It cost about £3,000. The first incumbent was Reverend Frederick Thomas Rowell M.A. (d.1865) Although the parish district was constituted in 1851, local contributors and bazaars took time to raise funds, so that the foundation stone was not laid until 20 October 1853. It was consecrated on Thursday 9 November 1854 by the Bishop of Ripon. Dr Hook attended the consecration service. The whole church measured 121 x 43 feet. It had a "large wheel window in the west gable, about 15ft diameter," a "lofty, open timber roof," and a "large, five-light, east window." It had an octagonal turret 82 feet high, which contained the stairs to the gallery and two bells. Mawer & Whiteley were the masons credited among the contractors. The building was closed in April and demolished in June 1939. After demolition, one of St Stephen's windows became the four-light west window of St Agnes, Burmantofts. The carved oak WWI war memorial now in St Agnes Church, Burmantofts, was once the reredos in St Stephen.

Media related to Former St Stephen's Church, Burmantofts at Wikimedia Commons

=== Moorlands House, 48 Albion Street, Leeds, 1852–1855 ===
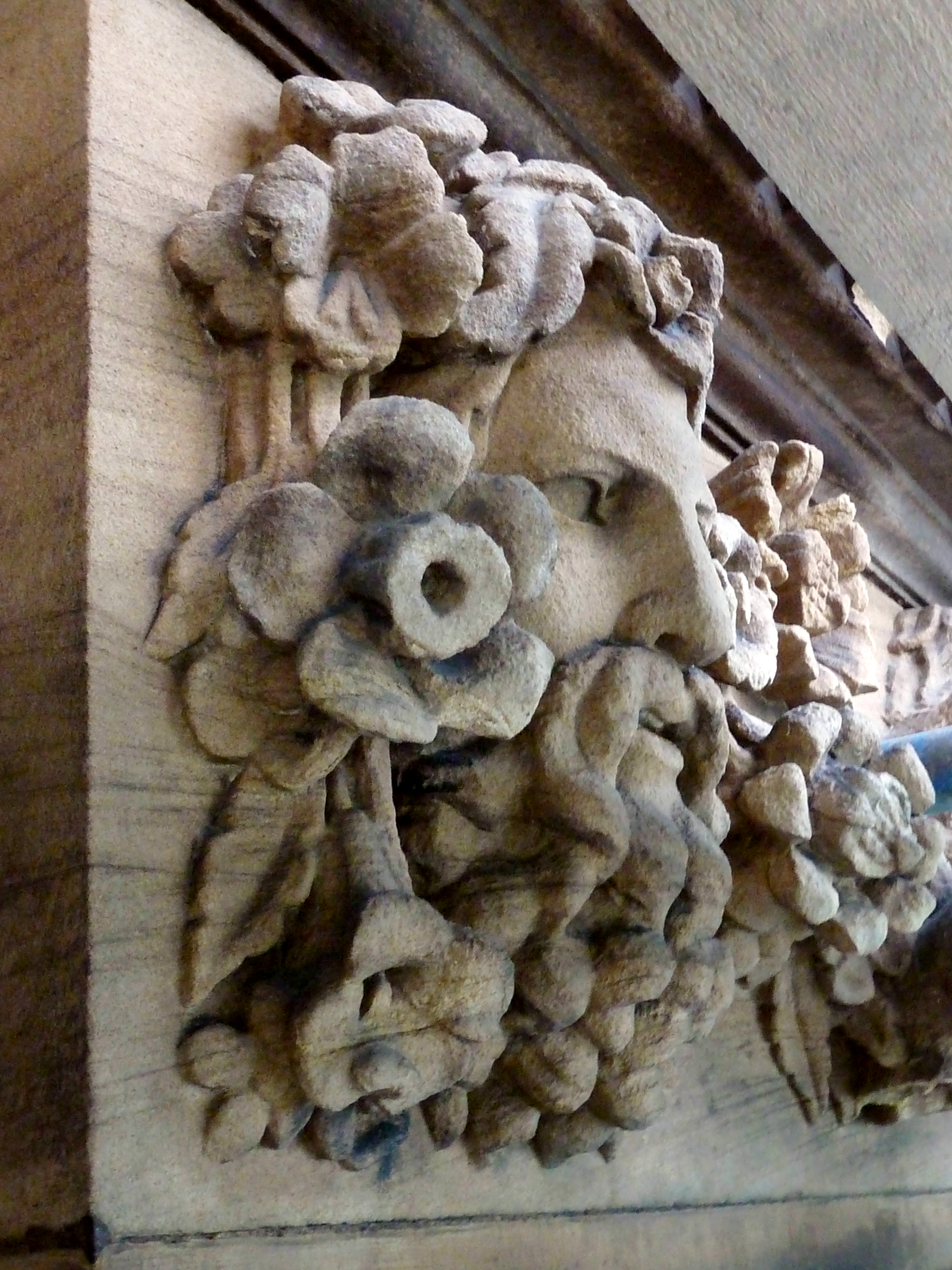
Sculpture on Moorlands House

This is a Grade II listed building at 48 Altion Street, Leeds, West Yorkshire, occupied by Starbucks since 2016. It was designed in Venetian palazzo style by William Bruce Gingell, for the Leeds and Yorkshire Assurance Company. It was built and carved in millstone grit from three different sources. Work began in 1852, and it was opened in 1855.

Robert Mawer carved most of the masks and the flower swags; they are similar to his work on Leeds Town Hall and St George's Hall, Bradford. However he died on 10 November 1854, before the building was completed. The goat's head, the sheep's head, and the delicately undercut leaves above the entrance door are in William Ingle's style, which ceased to be produced when he died in 1870. The portrait of Robert Mawer as a playing card joker is in Catherine Mawer's observant style. At the opening in 1855, the Leeds Intelligencer reported:

"... the rich but tasteful character of its decorative work ... The carved stone decoration on the exterior of the building, so universally admired, was almost the last work of the late Mr. Robert Mawer, a man whose taste and judgement (for much of it was his own design) were such that his place in Leeds cannot readily be supplied." (Leeds Intelligencer 17 March 1855)

Media related to Moorlands House, Albion Street, Leeds at Wikimedia Commons

=== St Cuthbert, Ackworth, 1855 ===
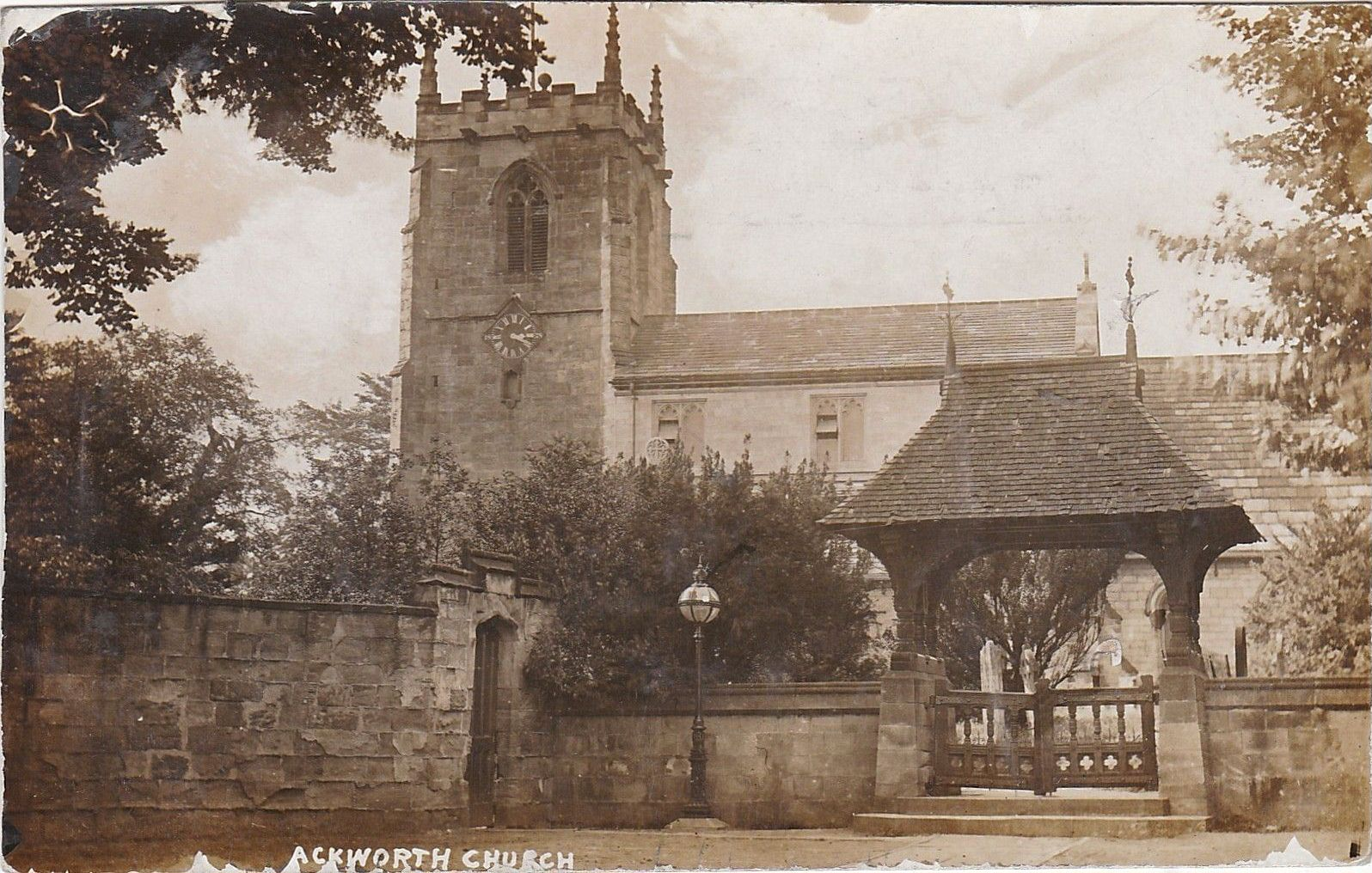
St Cuthbert's before 1914

This is a Grade II listed building in Ackworth, West Yorkshire. St Cuthbert's was a 15th-century church, of which the nave was reordered in 1852, and the old tower remains. It was restored by John West Hugall between 1852 and 1854. The east window of 1855, and possibly all the others which are of the same date, is by William Wailes.

In 1855, the Leeds Intelligencer said:

"The church has recently been re-opened after a most careful, and solid restoration. The carving of the capitals, and of the angels in the chancel and chancel aisle, the exquisite workmanship of the late lamented Mr Mawer, afforded much gratification."(Leeds Intelligencer 1 September 1855)

- Media related to Saint Cuthbert Church (Ackworth, West Yorkshire) at Wikimedia Commons

=== Reredos at Bradford Parish Church, 1854−1855 ===
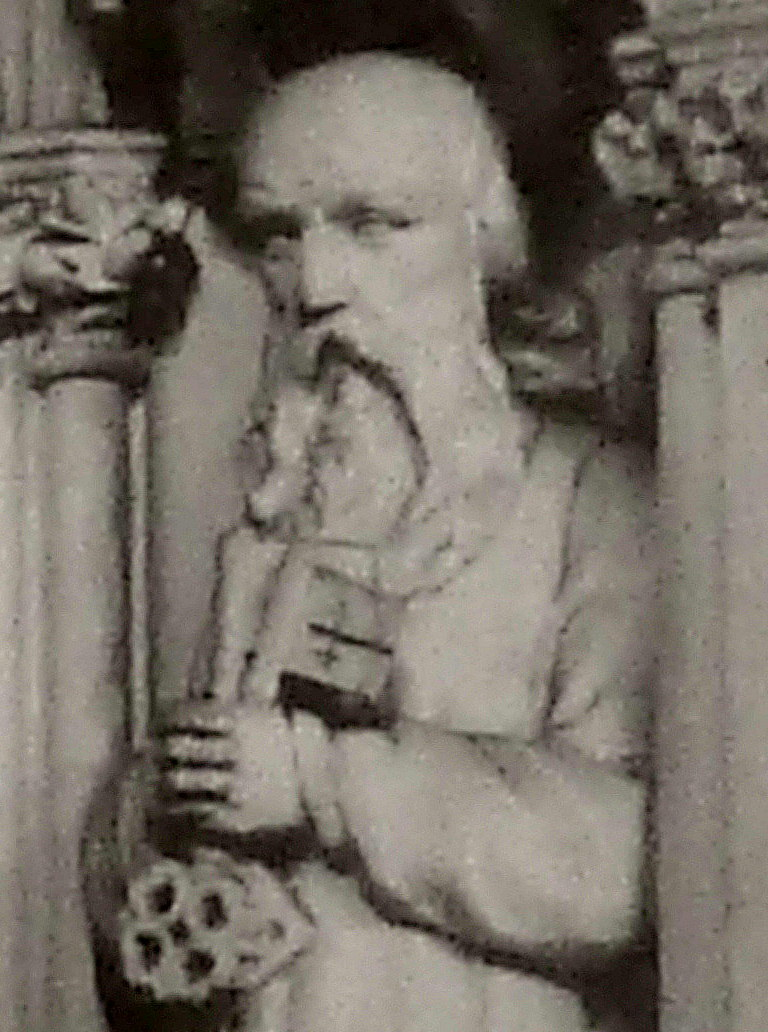
St Peter on former reredos, Bradford Parish Church

This is St Peter's parish church, or Bradford Cathedral, on Stott Hill, Bradford, West Yorkshire. It is a Grade I listed building. The Victorian reredos was executed by Robert Mawer before he died in 1854, and consecrated in 1855. In August of that year, the Bradford Observer reported: "There has been added a reredos of Caen stone which is most beautifully carved, being the workmanship of Mr. Mawer of Leeds." The east end of the building was rebuilt by architect Sir Edward Maufe in the 1950s, and the reredos is no longer in the building. It may possibly survive elsewhere.

The church was further re-ordered in 1861, and partially rebuilt with transepts, re-roofed and re-ordered in 1899.The mosaics in the reredos were added at this time.

- Media related to Bradford Cathedral at Wikimedia Commons

== See also ==
- Catherine Mawer
- Charles Mawer
- Benjamin Payler
- Matthew Taylor (sculptor)
- Benjamin Burstall
- Mawer and Ingle
- William Ingle
