= Ingalls, Missouri =

Extinct hamlet in Missouri, U.S.

Coordinates: 37.7889254°N 93.2010258°W

Ingalls is an extinct town in Polk County, in the U.S. state of Missouri.

A post office called Ingalls was established in 1890, and remained in operation until 1914. The community derives its name from the local Inglis family (a postal error accounts for the error is spelling, which was never corrected).
