= Laura Ingalls (disambiguation) =

Laura Ingalls (1867–1957) is the birth name of American writer Laura Ingalls Wilder, author of the Little House on the Prairie books.

Laura Ingalls may also refer to:

- Laura Ingalls (aviator) (1893–1967), American pilot and Nazi agent
- Laura Louise Colby Ingalls (1810–1883), mother of Charles Ingalls and paternal grandmother of Laura Ingalls Wilder
