= William Ingle =

English architectural sculptor (1828–1870)

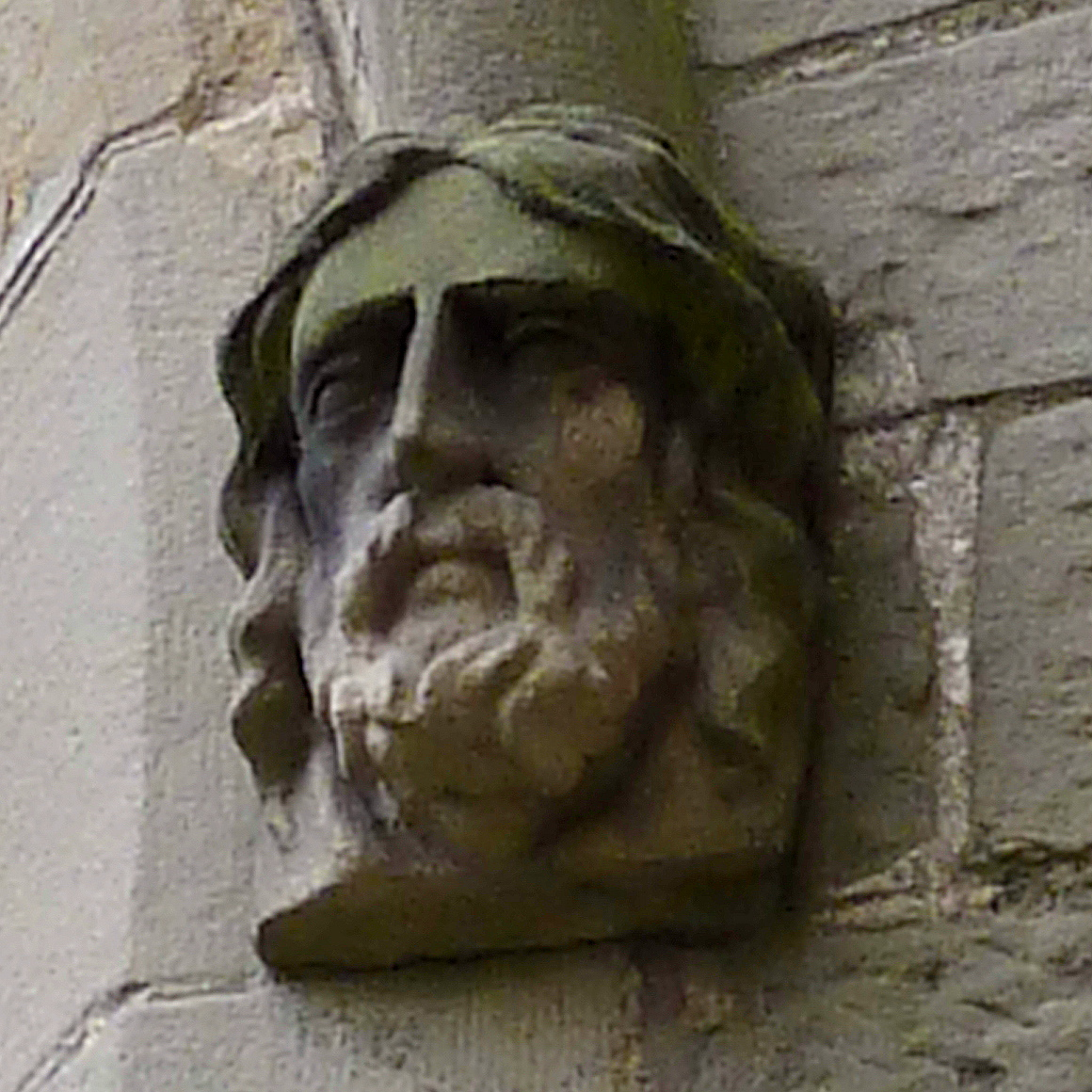
- Portrait of William Ingle aged about 24 years, by Robert Mawer, in St James' Church, Boroughbridge
- Born: 1828; Bishop Thornton
- Died: 25 March 1870, aged 41 years Leeds
- Notable work: Architectural sculpture on: Mill Hill Chapel, 1848; Moorlands House, Leeds, 1854; Leeds Town Hall, 1854; 30 Park Place, Leeds, 1865; Endcliffe Hall, Sheffield, 1865; Commercial Bank, Bradford, 1868
- Style: Gothic Revival; Neoclassical
- Movement: Aesthetic movement Romanticism; Gothic Revival; Neoclassicism
- Spouse: Ann Elizabeth Agar

William Ingle (1828 – 25 March 1870) was an architectural sculptor in Leeds, West Yorkshire, England. He specialised in delicately undercut bas relief and small stand-alone stone sculptures of natural and imaginary flora and fauna on churches and on civic, commercial and domestic buildings. He was apprenticed to his uncle Robert Mawer. After Mawer's death in 1854 he worked in partnership with his aunt Catherine Mawer and his cousin Charles Mawer in the company Mawer and Ingle. Notable works by Ingle exist on Leeds Town Hall, Endcliffe Hall, Sheffield and Moorlands House, Leeds. He sometimes exhibited gentle humour in his ecclesiastical work, such as faces peering through greenery, and mischievous humour on secular buildings, such as comic rabbits and frogs among foliage. He died of tuberculosis at age 41 years, having suffered the disease for two years.

== Early life ==
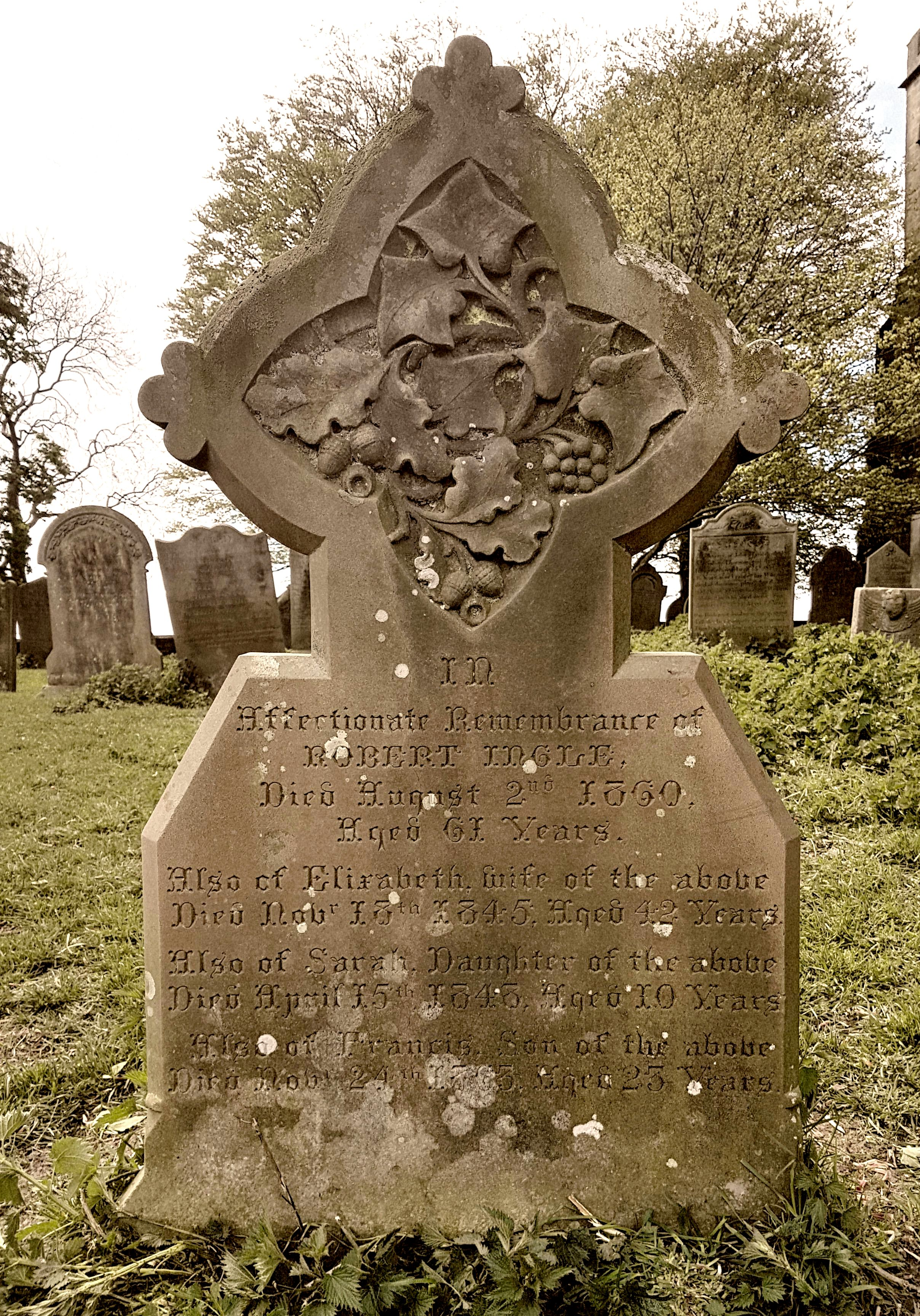
Gravestone of Ingle's parents

William Ingle (1828 – 25 March 1870) was the nephew of Robert and Catherine Mawer, and cousin of their son Charles Mawer. He was the eldest son of Robert Ingle (1799 – 2 August 1860), a corn miller at Render Mills, Bishop Thornton, and Elizabeth Ingle née Mawer (1802 – 18 November 1845), sister of the sculptor Robert Mawer. Robert Ingle and Elizabeth Mawer were married at Ripon Cathedral on 3 October 1825. They were both buried at Bishop Thornton. William Ingle was baptised on 30 June 1828 at Bishop Thornton, West Riding of Yorkshire.

== Apprenticeship ==
Assuming the regular pattern of apprenticeship between the ages of 14 and 21 years, Ingle was apprenticed to Robert Mawer between about 1842 and 1849.

== Family life and career ==
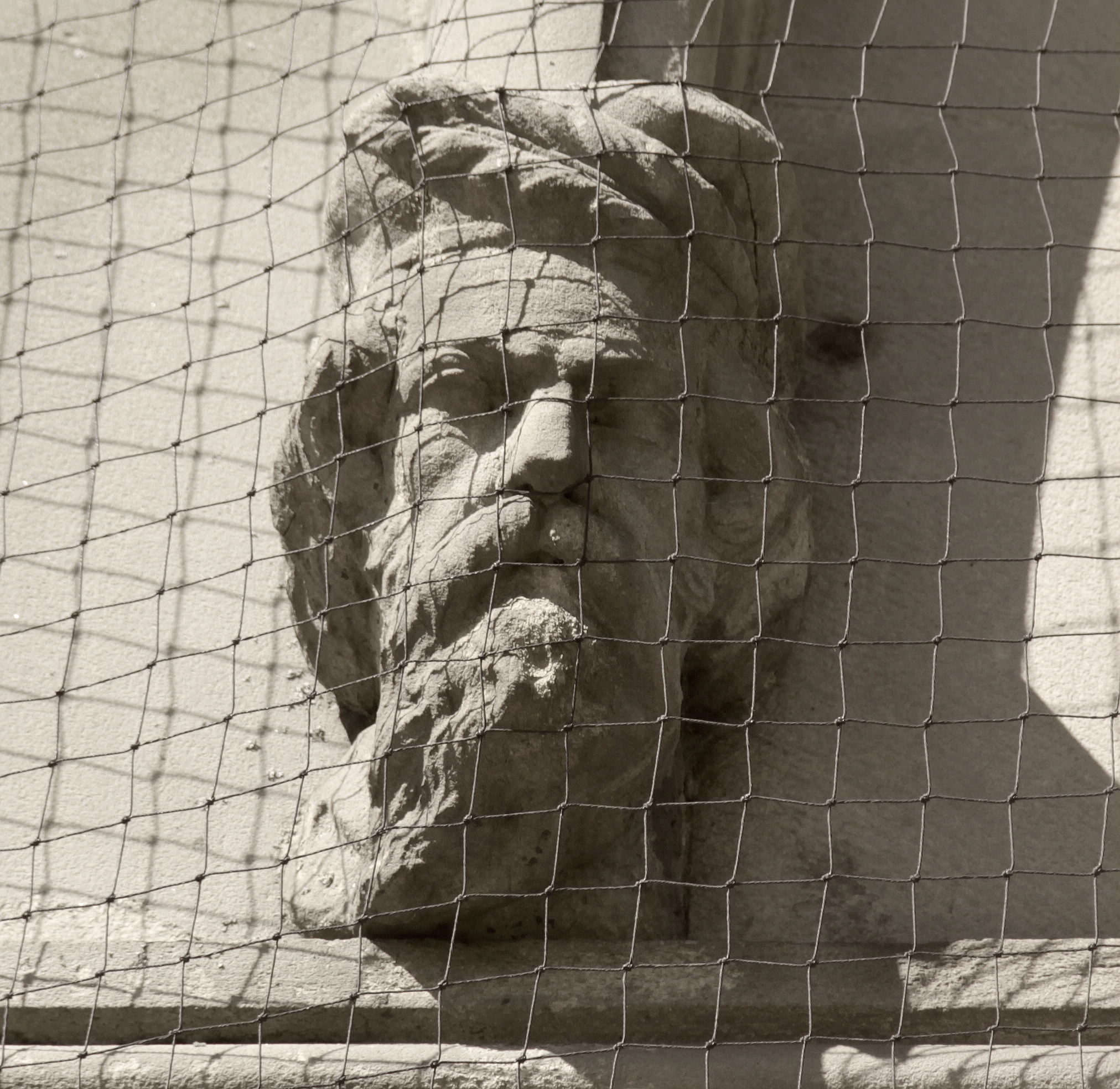
Portrait of William Ingle aged about 39 years, after contracting TB, carved by Catherine Mawer. The feather in his cap celebrates his successful work on the Commercial Bank, Bradford

He married Ann Elizabeth Agar (b. 1832 at Kimpton, Yorkshire), daughter of Benjamin Agar, an estate agent, in 1852 at Leeds. In 1851, at age 22, he was living at a lodging house in Leeds, describing himself as a stone and wood carver. By 1861 he and his wife were living at 38 Portland Crescent, Leeds, and William described himself as a sculptor and stone carver in the Census that year. They had four children: Amelia Jane (born 1852), Arthur Robert (1855–1865), Fred (1861–1875), and Ernest (1866–1955), all born in Leeds. Ernest was described in the 1871 Census as "deaf and dumb from birth."

Ingle was a member of the Mawer Group, a closely associated group of architectural sculptors working in Leeds in the 19th century. The group included Robert Mawer, Catherine Mawer, Charles Mawer, Benjamin Payler, Matthew Taylor, and Ingle himself. Unlike the other sculptors in this group, Ingle was never credited by personal name for his work, by contemporary newspapers and other documents; they always referred to the company Mawer and Ingle. He was employed as a sculptor by master sculptor Robert Mawer from about 1849 until Robert Mawer's death in 1854, when Ingle became a master sculptor himself. So long as Ingle was working from the Mawer stoneyard, it produced various carving styles including finely undercut natural vegetation, and natural and comical wildlife and mythical animals. After he died, such natural, realistic elements were no longer produced in the same delicate style, so it is reasonable to suppose that this was Ingle's work. Ingle superintended the stone yard and onsite works under the management of Catherine Mawer after Robert Mawer's death, then became a partner in the firm of Mawer & Ingle.

Leeds Civic Trust arranged to unveil two blue plaques At the Henry Moore Institute on 11 July 2019, commemorating the work of Robert Mawer, Catherine Mawer and William Ingle, besides the Mawer Group as a whole. This plaques were to be affixed to Moorlands House, Albion Street, and 30 Park Place, both in Leeds, at a later date.

== Death ==
William Ingle died aged 41 years on 26 March 1870, at 73 Portland Crescent, Leeds. He had had tuberculosis for two years. His mother in law Ann Agar was present at his death.

== Blue plaque in Leeds ==
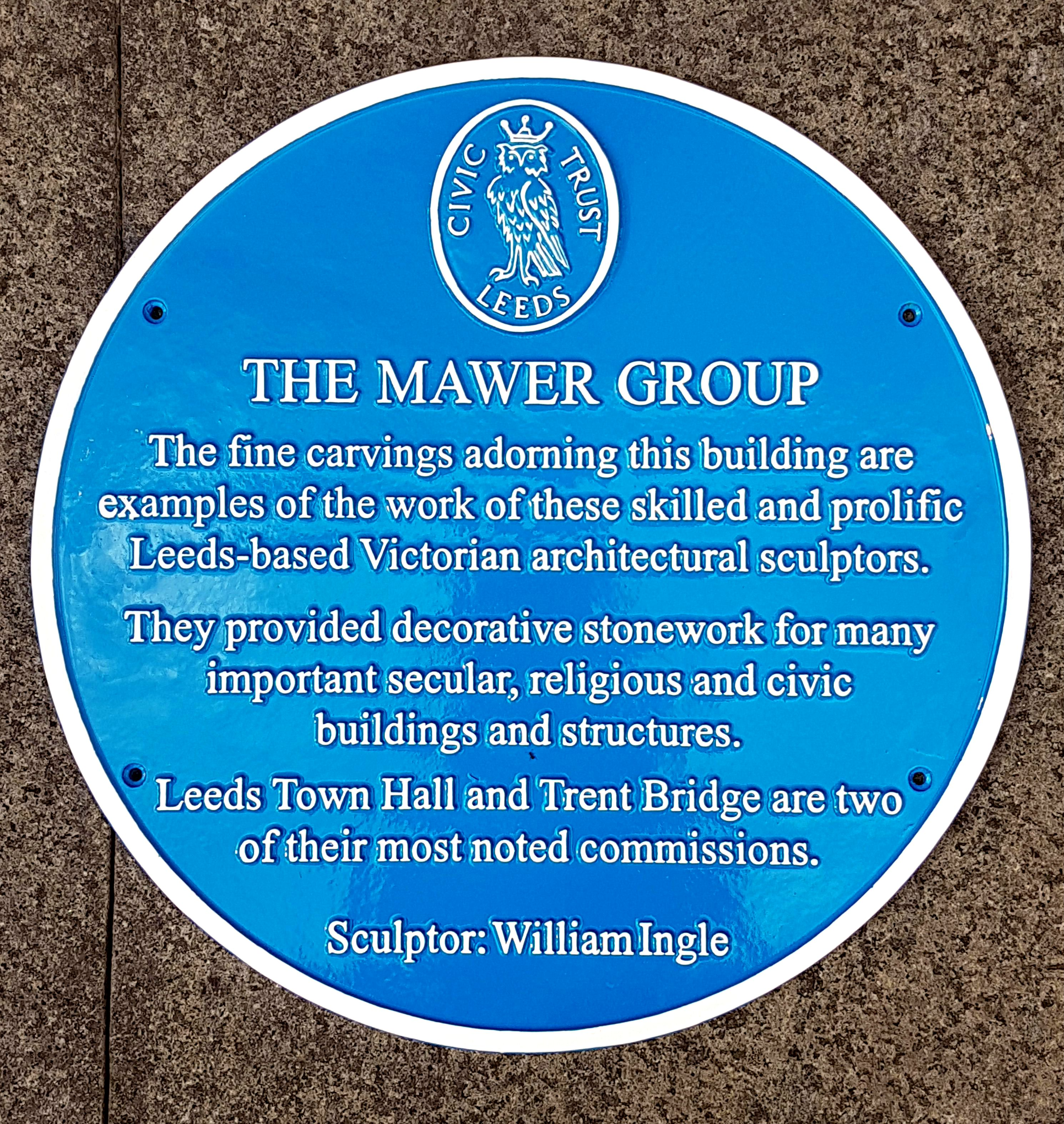
Blue plaque for William Ingle

At the Henry Moore Institute on 11 July 2019, Leeds Civic Trust unveiled two blue plaques in recognition of the Mawer Group. One of them commemorates the work of William Ingle on 30 Park Place, Leeds. It was scheduled to be affixed to the building at a later date.

== Works for Robert Mawer ==
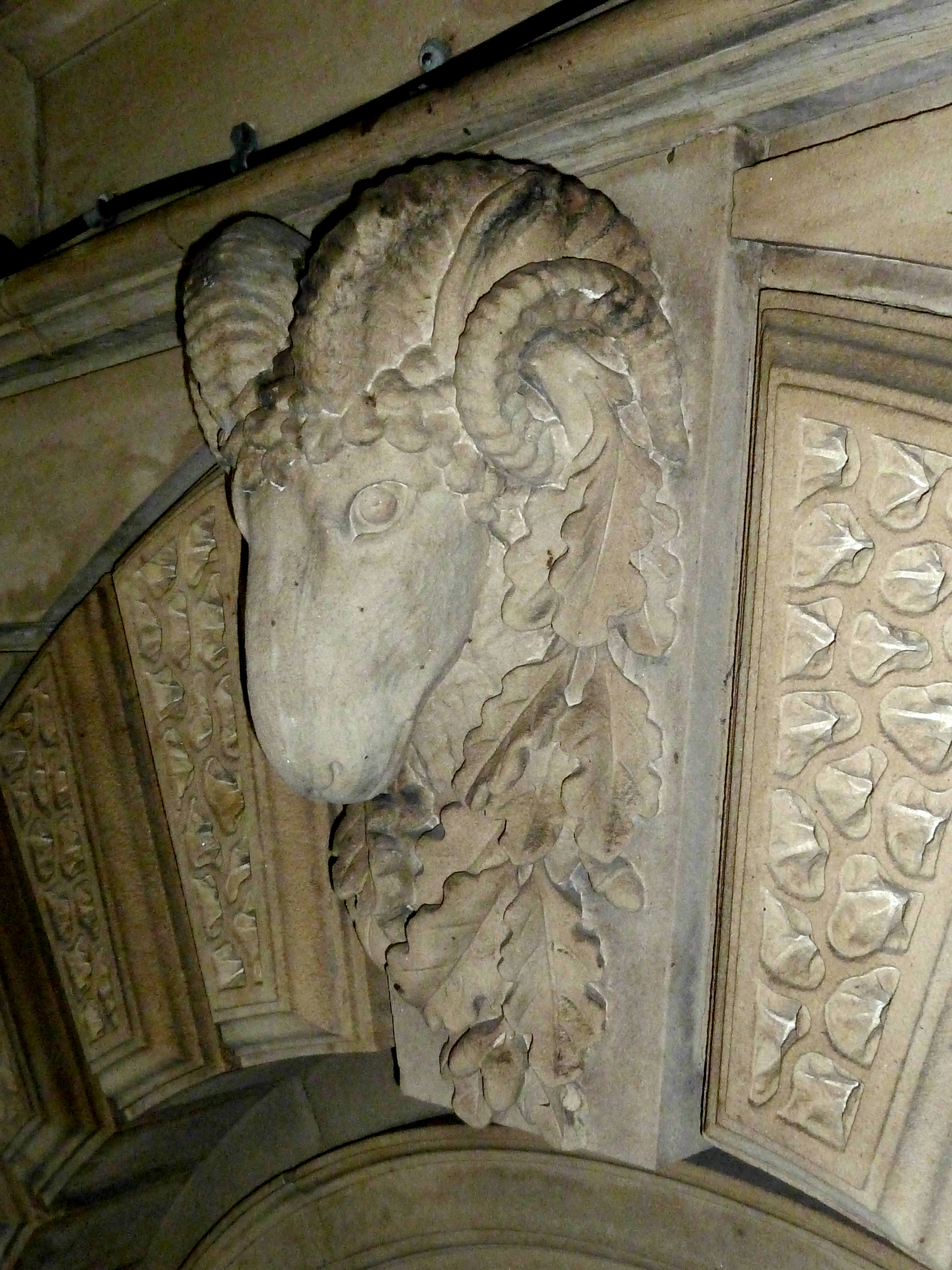
Sheep's head symbolising the Fleece, or Leeds' source of income (1855) by William Ingle, on Moorlands House

- Church of St Paul and St Jude, Manningham, 1846−1848. Animal drain-pipe gargoyles.
- Mill Hill Unitarian Chapel, Leeds, 1847–1848. Animal cornice reliefs, fauna and vegetation on reredos, drain-pipe gargoyles, animal and vegetation on pulpit.
- Church of St Matthew, Bankfoot, Bradford, 1848–1849. Vegetation on capitals, drain-pipe gargoyles
- St Michael and All Angels, Shelf, Halifax, 1849–1850. (No work by Ingle yet identified)
- St Mary the Virgin, Quarry Hill, Leeds, restoration 1850. (Demolished)
- Church of St Mary the Virgin, Gomersal, 1850–1851. (The carving is as yet unexamined)
- St Catherine, Barmby Moor, restoration 1851−1852. (The carving is as yet unexamined)
- Church of St James, Boroughbridge, 1851−1852. (No carving by Ingle yet found)
- St George's Hall, Bradford, 1849–1853. Vine leaves with grapes, Corinthian capitals.
- Former St Andrew, Listerhills Road, North Horton, 1853. (Demolished)
- St Mark, Woodhouse, Leeds, 1853 and 1856. Some tower gargoyles may be Ingle's work
- Old Church of St John the Evangelist, New Wortley, Leeds, 1853. (Demolished)
- Church of St Matthias, Burley, Leeds, 1853−1854. (The carving has not yet been examined)
- Moorlands House, 48 Albion Street, Leeds, 1852–1855. Bulls' and sheep's heads, acanthus leaf panels.
- St Cuthbert, Ackworth, 1855. Possibly some foliage decoration, and a dog in foliage on a capital.
- Reredos at Bradford Parish Church, 1854−1855. Foliage on former reredos (since demolished)

Media related to Robert Mawer at Wikimedia Commons

== Works for Catherine Mawer ==
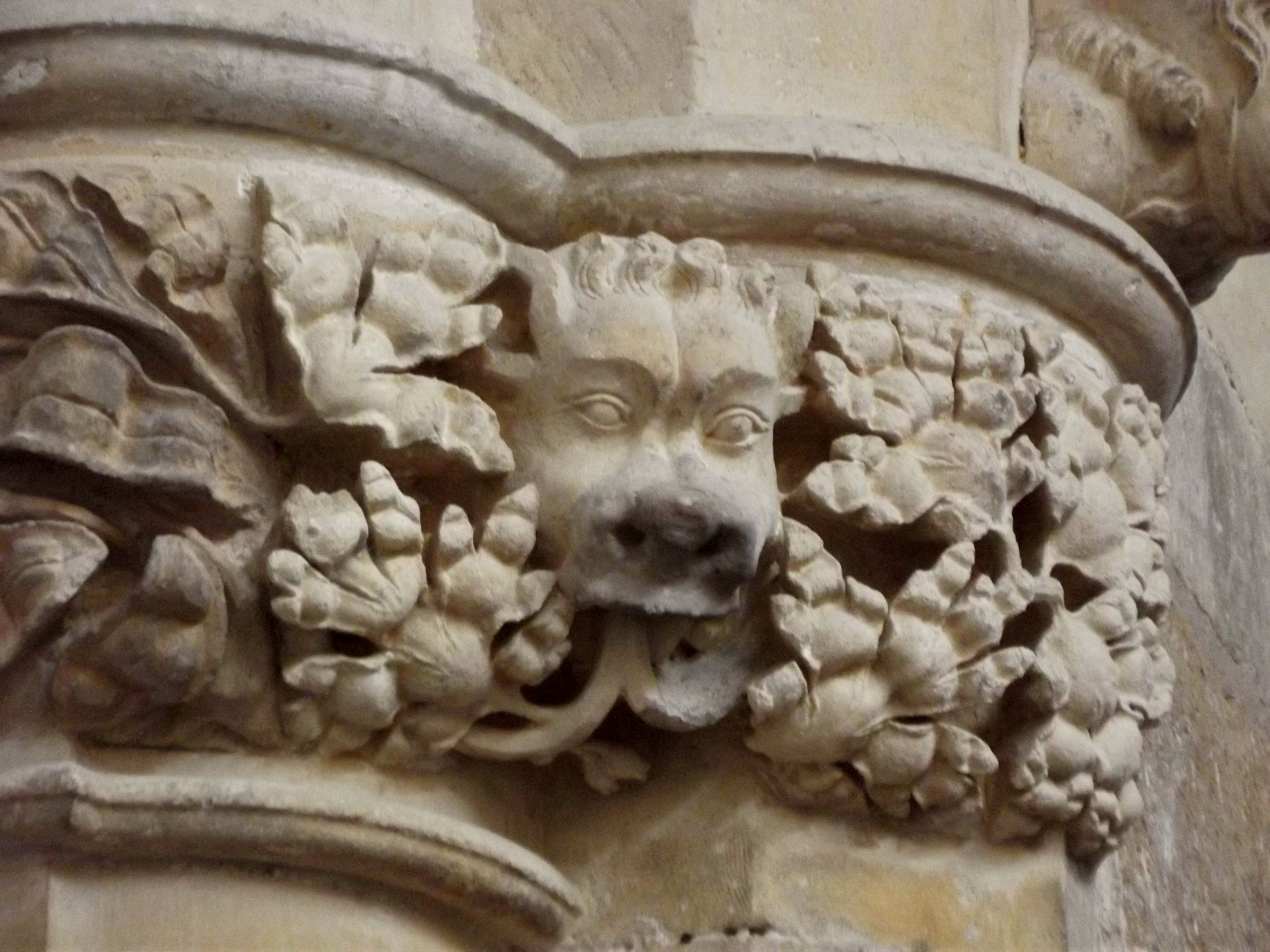
Capital (1859), in faux Romanesque style, featuring green man-animal among natural foliage, in St Peter, Barton upon Humber

- Susannah Blesard monument, St Mark, Woodhouse, 1856. Flora and fauna on memorial.
- Former St Mark's, Low Moor, Bradford, 1855−1857. Foliage on capitals, tympanum of south porch, drainpipe gargoyle, foliage on interior capitals, pulpit and font (interior no longer accessible to public)
- New Hall for Halifax Mechanics Institution, 1855−1857. Most of the foliage is by Ingle, while Catherine carved the heads.
- Church of the Holy Innocents, Thornhill Lees 1858. Gargoyles on exterior (interior carving has not yet been examined).
- Town Hall, Leeds, 1853–1858. Foliage and ram's heads on front door panels, arch over front door tympanum, roof pinnacles, sheep on clock tower, Corinthian capitals.
- Memorial tablet, John the Baptist Knaresborough, 1859–1860. All carving of foliage is by Ingle.
- St Peter, Barton-upon-Humber, restoration 1859. Foliage and fauna on capitals and font, animal heads on colonnade in nave.
- St Stephen's Church, Bowling Old Lane, Bradford 1859–1860. Gargoyles.

Media related to Catherine Mawer at Wikimedia Commons

== Works for Mawer and Ingle ==
- Former Barnsley Cemetery chapels, lodges and gateway, 1860–1861. On remaining entrance archway and colonnade: foliage on capitals and label stops. Includes the only insect carved by the Mawer group. Both chapels demolished.
- Warehouses, Bradford, 1862. (Demolished)
- Church of St Mary, Lower Dunsforth, Boroughbridge, 1861. (The carving has yet to be examined)
- Former St Bartholomew's, Armley, Leeds, 1861. (Demolished)
- Church of St Ricarius, Aberford, 1862. Interior corbels, font.
- Former St Matthews, Chapel Allerton, 1861–1863. (Demolished)
- Reredos at Christ Church, High Harrogate, 1861–1862. Removed and destroyed. Ingle may have carved the "flowery capitals" on it.
- Albert Memorial, Queensbury, 1863. Stone panels with foliage and hidden birds, diapering, crocketing.
- Church of St Peter, Bramley, 1861–1863. Nave demolished and replaced in 20th century, tower remains. Ingle possibly carved gargoyles, pinnacles and capitals on tower.
- Hepper & Sons auctioneers sales rooms and offices, East Parade, Leeds 1863. Natural foliage on some capitals.
- Warehouses, 30 Park Place, Leeds, 1865. All carving on this building: natural foliage and hidden animals, birds and frogs.
- Endcliffe Hall, Sheffield, 1863–1865. Naturalistic carving of foliage and animals, including hidden detail throughout.
- Former St John the Evangelist, Wortley, Leeds, 1864–1865. (Demolished)
- Former Holy Trinity, Louth, 1866. Natural foliage on label stops and capitals.
- Memorial tablet at Holy Trinity, Low Moor, Bradford, 1866. One of Ingle's foremost works: he executed all carving except the roundel portrait and the dedication panel. Humour is shown in an over-large albatross nest on a delicate pinnacle, the bird imitating a pelican vulning. There are quirky hidden sirens, supposed to bring luck if seen, but requiring a ladder to view.
- Wool Exchange, Bradford, 1864–1867. Naturalistic foliage on interior capitals.
- Statues of Sweep and Shoeblack, originally in Peel Park, Bradford, 1867. (Statues now lost)
- Former Church of St Peter, Dewsbury Road, Hunslet Moor, 1866–1868. (Demolished)
- Commercial Bank, Bradford, 1867–1868. Ingle's last major work, the same building featuring a portrait of him with feather in cap by Catherine Mawer. He carved label stops and small stand-alone sculptures featuring natural and fanciful marine animals, including ships' rats and cats.
- Former Church of St Clement, Chapeltown Road, Leeds, 1867–1868. (Demolished)
- St John the Evangelist, Lepton 1866–1868. (The carving is as yet unexamined)
- Former Unitarian Chapel, Chapel Lane, Bradford, 1869. (Demolished)
- Scottish Widows insurance building, Park Row, Leeds, 1869. Only one portico remains; Ingle's original contribution is unknown.
- United Free Methodists day and infant schools, Farsley, 1869. (Sculpture is as yet unexamined)
- Christ Church, Windhill, Shipley, 1868–1869. (The sculpture is as yet unexamined)
- Former Church of St Silas, Hunslet, 1868–1869. (Demolished)
- Church of St John the Evangelist, Dewsbury, 1869. (The sculpture is as yet unexamined, but Ingle may have contributed to the pulpit and font)
- Former Church of All Saints, Woodlesford, 1869–1870. (Sculpture as yet unexamined. However Ingle died in 1870 after two years' severe illness, so his contribution is unknown)
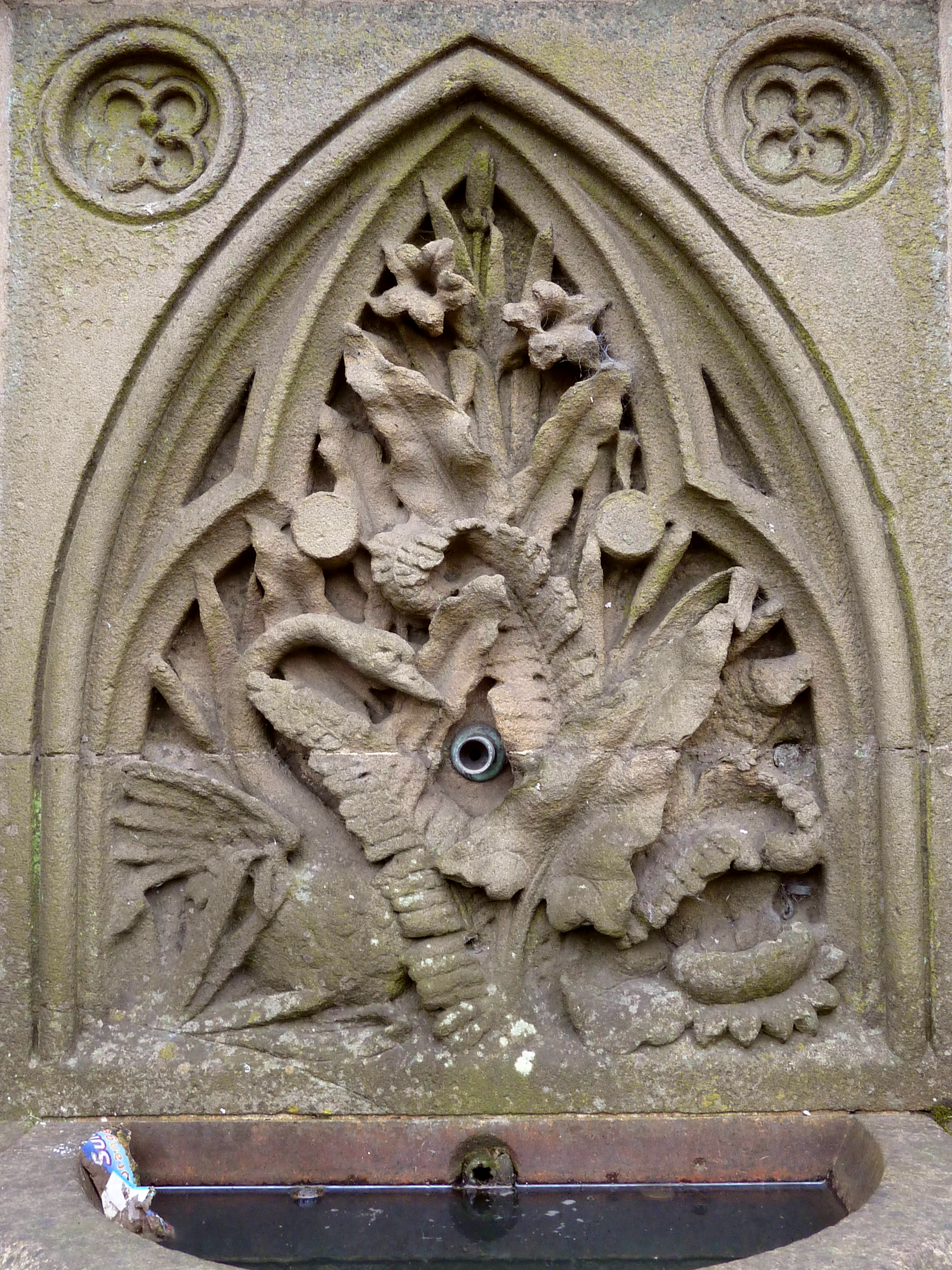
Panel with swan hidden in foliage (1863) on the Albert Memorial, Queensbury

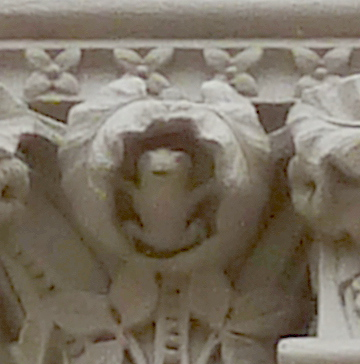
Hidden frog (1865) on 30 Park Place, Leeds

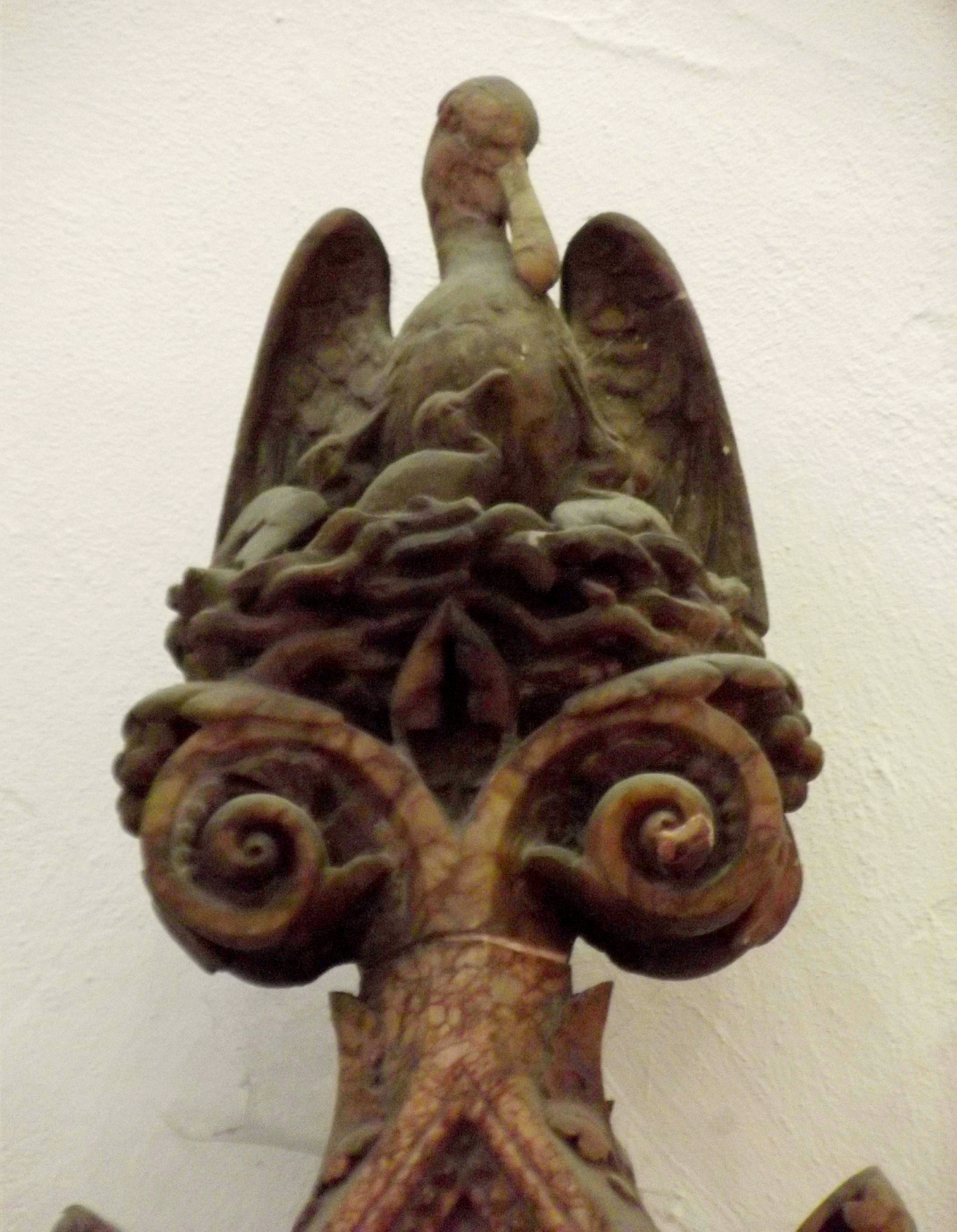
Comical albatross nest on pinnacle (1866) on memorial tablet, Holy Trinity, Low Moor

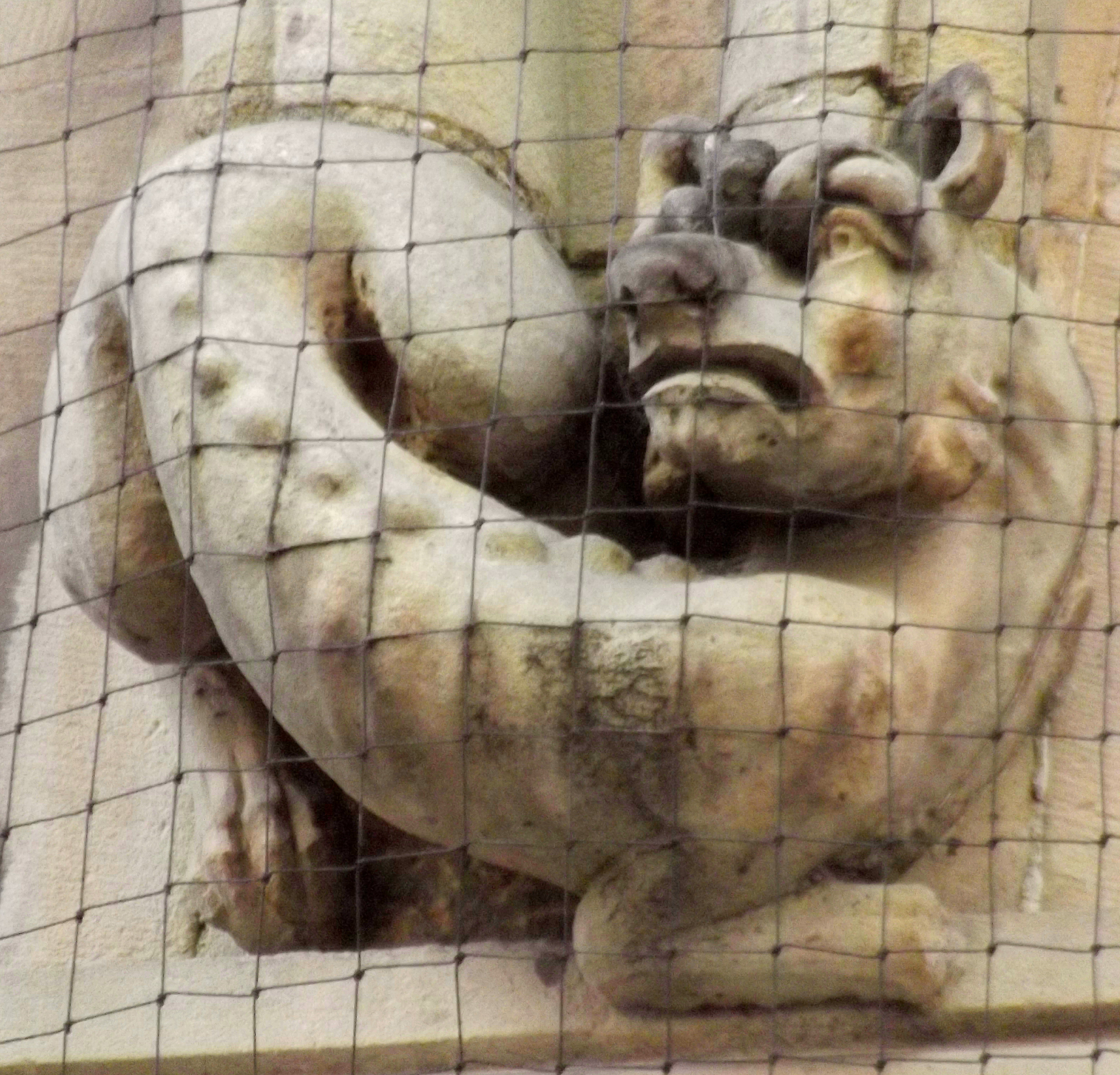
Imaginary creature (1868) on Old Commercial Bank, Bradford

Media related to Mawer and Ingle at Wikimedia Commons

== See also ==
- Robert Mawer
- Catherine Mawer
- Charles Mawer
- Benjamin Payler
- Matthew Taylor (sculptor)
- Benjamin Burstall
- Mawer and Ingle
