= Mawer and Ingle =

Architectural sculptors in Leeds, England

- Type: Partnership
- Industry: Architectural sculpture
- Predecessors: Robert Mawer; Catherine Mawer
- Founded: 1860 in Leeds, West Yorkshire, England
- Founders: Charles Mawer, William Ingle, Catherine Mawer
- Defunct: 1871
- Successors: Charles Mawer; Mawer and Payler; Benjamin Payler
- Headquarters: 50 Great George Street, Leeds, England
- Areas served: Yorkshire and other counties
- Products: Architectural sculpture, fonts, pulpits, reredoses etc.
- Owners: Founders as above

Mawer and Ingle was a company of architectural sculptors, based in Leeds, West Yorkshire, England, between 1860 and 1871. It comprised cousins Charles Mawer (born 1839) and William Ingle (1828–1870), and Catherine Mawer (1804–1877) who was mother of Charles and aunt of William. The group produced carvings on many Gothic Revival churches and their internal furnishings. They also worked on civic buildings, warehouses and offices. Many of these are now listed by Historic England, and many of the surviving buildings are within Yorkshire. Their work outside Yorkshire included Trent Bridge.

== Sculpture studio ==
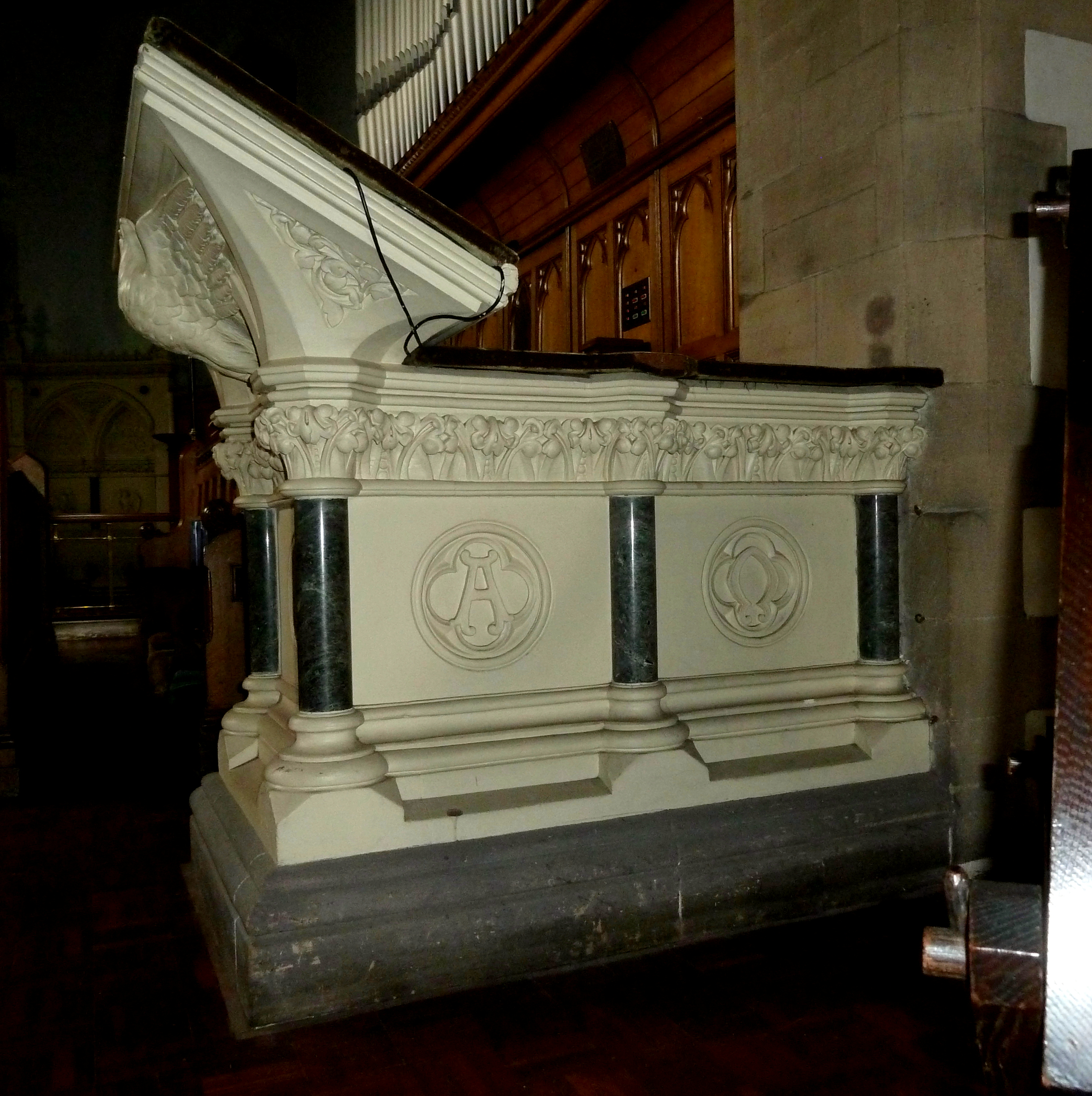
Reading desk (1889) by Benjamin Payler, carved in the Mawer Stoneyard

This was known as Mawer's Stoneyard. Some free-standing and smaller items could be completed or half-worked in the stoneyard, then transported and completed onsite as necessary. Because massive stones with delicate carving could not be transported, exterior architectural sculpture was worked on location. The masons prepared the stone by roughing out a protuberance for the sculptors. After the walls were built, incorporating those roughed-out stones, the stone carvers would ascend those walls on ladders and scaffolds, and complete the sculptures in public view.

The partnership between Hugh Collitt, Robert Mawer and George Hope, masons of Leeds, was dissolved on 14 May 1842. Thereafter, Mawer worked with his wife Catherine, and his nephew William Ingle after he came of age. After Robert Mawer died in 1854, Catherine ran the Stoneyard until Mawer & Ingle was formed in 1860. Until at least 1854, the stone and wood-carving was carried on at 7 Oxford Place, Leeds - and on 22 November 1854, Catherine and Charles pledged to carry on the business there, under the superintendence of Wiliam Ingle.

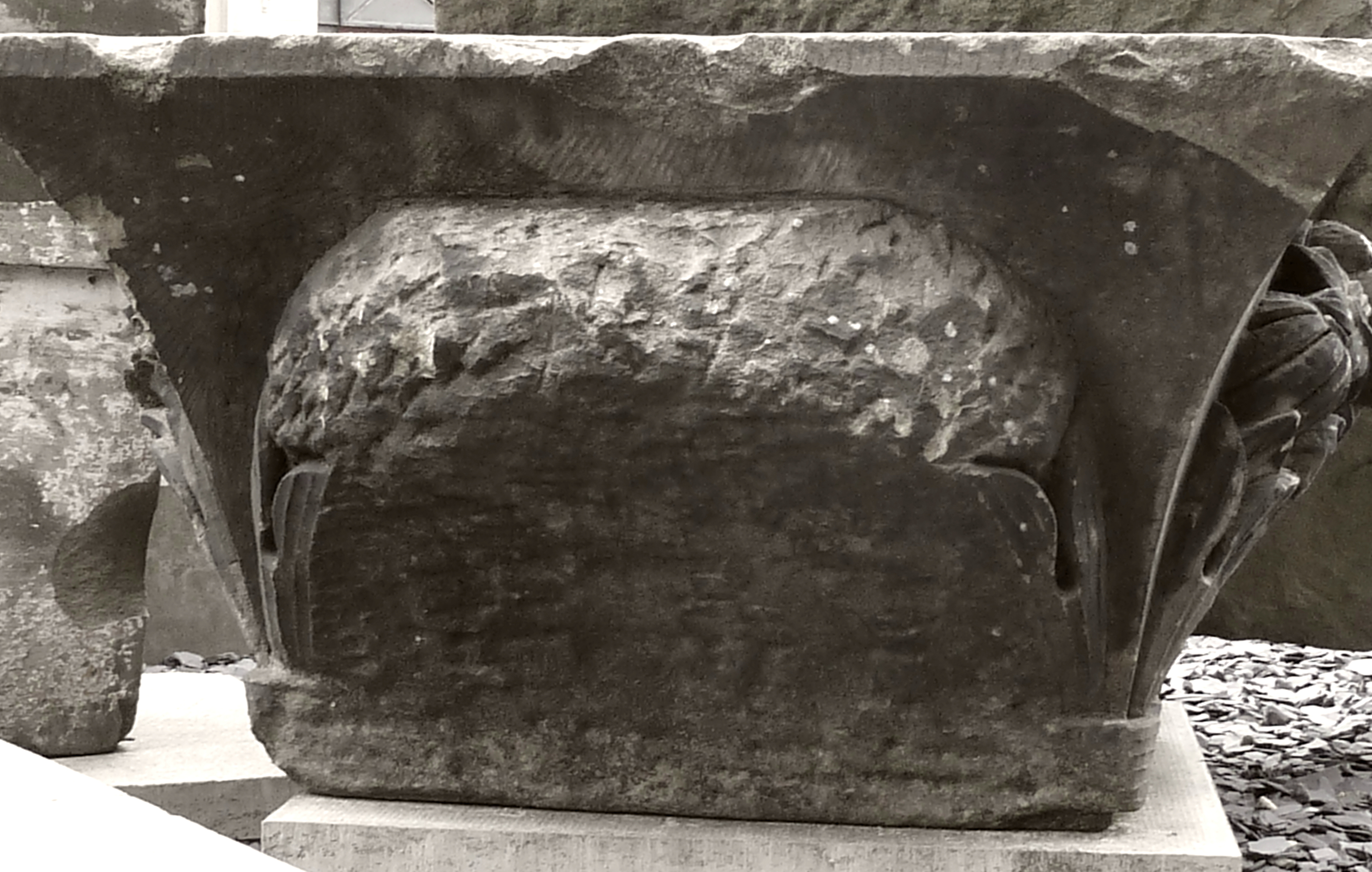
A stone roughed out for carving, from the former Kirkgate Market, Bradford

The stonemasonry companies Mawer & Ingle, and Catherine Mawer & Son, flourished between 1846 and 1871. The Press refers to the firm as "Mawer & Ingle" throughout that period. Catherine Mawer was partner in both businesses, and both were located at 50 Great George Street, Leeds, specialising in monumental masonry, stone masonry and wood-carving. Charles Mawer was partner in Catherine Mower & Son, and later worked under his own name. Mawer & Ingle contributed to the Leeds Tradesmen's Benevolent Institution, and in 1863, they contributed £3 9s 3d to the Cotton Districts Relief Fund, Leeds. The partnership Mawer, Mawer & Ingle, between Catherine Mawer, William Ingle and Charles Mawer, described as stone carvers, was dissolved by 11 January 1867. Although Charles describes himself as a stone carver in the Census, Catherine is merely identified as a business owner in the trade directories McCorquodale's and White's.

Charles Mawer worked alone from 1870, when William Ingle died, until at least 1880 when the Church of St Thomas the Apostle at Killilnghall was completed. By 1882, he had been joined at Great George Street by sculptor Benjamin Payler, and they were trading as Mawer & Payler for a year or two. Around 1881, Charles disappears from public record. Thereafter, Payler continued the business at the same premises, under his own name.

== Works by Mawer & Ingle ==
=== Former Barnsley Cemetery chapels, lodges and gateway, 1860–1861 ===
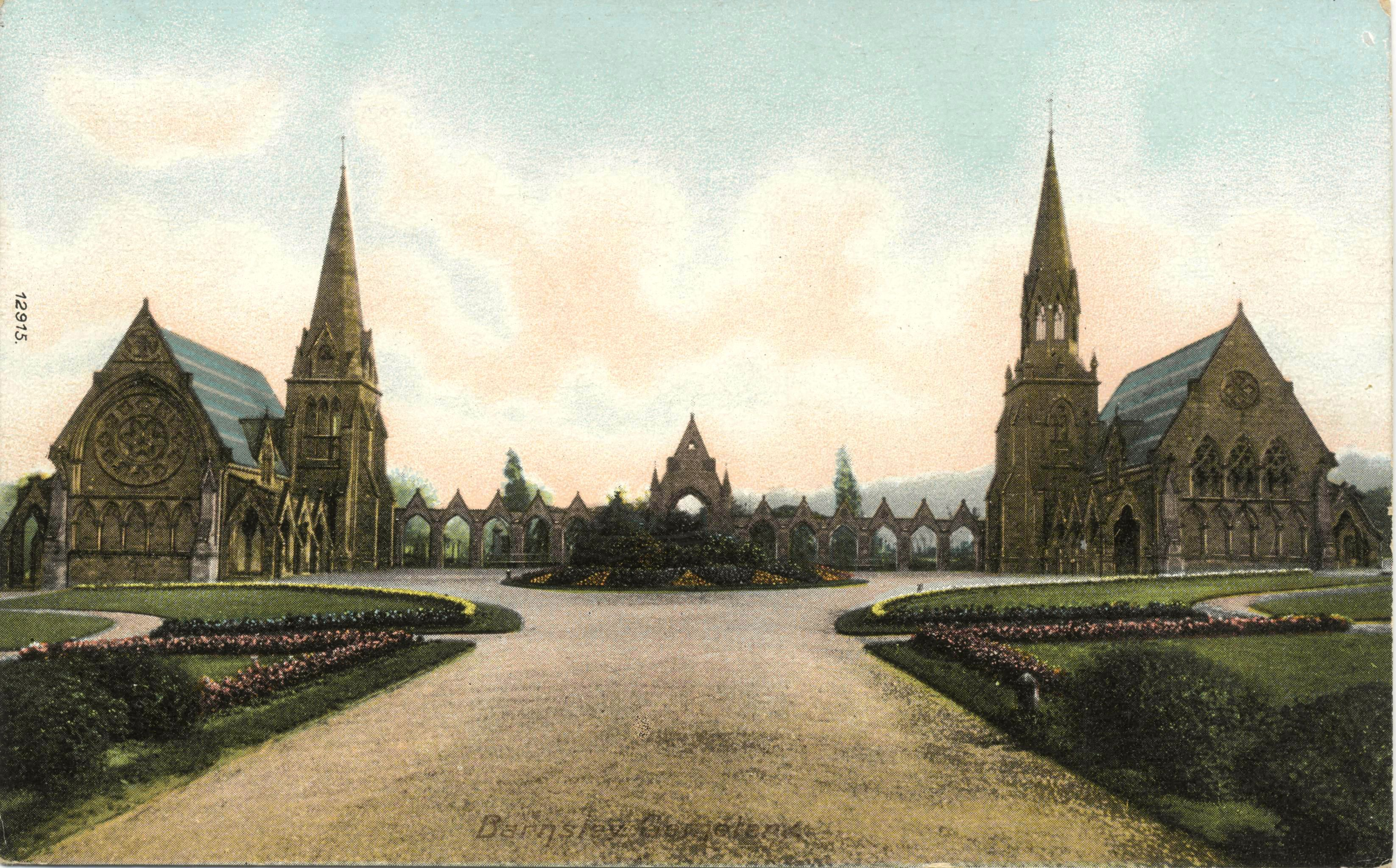
The two chapels, before 1914

The two former Gothic Revival chapels designed by Perkins & Backhouse at Barnsley Cemetery, Cemetery Road, Barnsley, were demolished in 1983. All that remains of them is the Grade II listed arcade which originally linked the two. Historic England describes the arcade thus:

"Coursed squared stone with ashlar dressings. Central pointed arched gateway, gabled with kneelers and a band of circles with trefoils. Trefoil in apex. Reducing angle buttresses with pinnacles. A low Gothic arcade to each side, gabled and divided by reducing buttresses."

Besides the two chapels, the Board was planning a lodge, a mortuary chapel, and an entrance gateway in 1860. The lodge and mortuary chapel survive, now Grade II listed as two lodges and a gateway, on Cemetery Road. The left-hand lodge has an entrance with an "arched head and hoodmould with foliage stops." One pair of windows on the right hand lodge has similar decoration, plus moulded gutter brackets. However the "lodge" which was originally the mortuary is again recognised as such, and as of 2011 it served as a gallery for the Friends of Barnsley Cemetery.

The foundation stones of the two chapels were laid by the chairman of the Burial Board on Tuesday 29 May 1860. "Mr. Mawer of Leeds, carver" is listed among the artisans, in documents placed in bottles under each of the foundation stones. A large procession, including three brass bands, officials, clergy, Sunday School children, architects and the contractors, walked from Peel Square to the cemetery for the occasion. The Church of England portion of the cemetery was consecrated on 2 November 1861 by the Bishop of Ripon.

Media related to Barnsley Cemetery at Wikimedia Commons

=== Warehouses, Bradford, 1862 ===
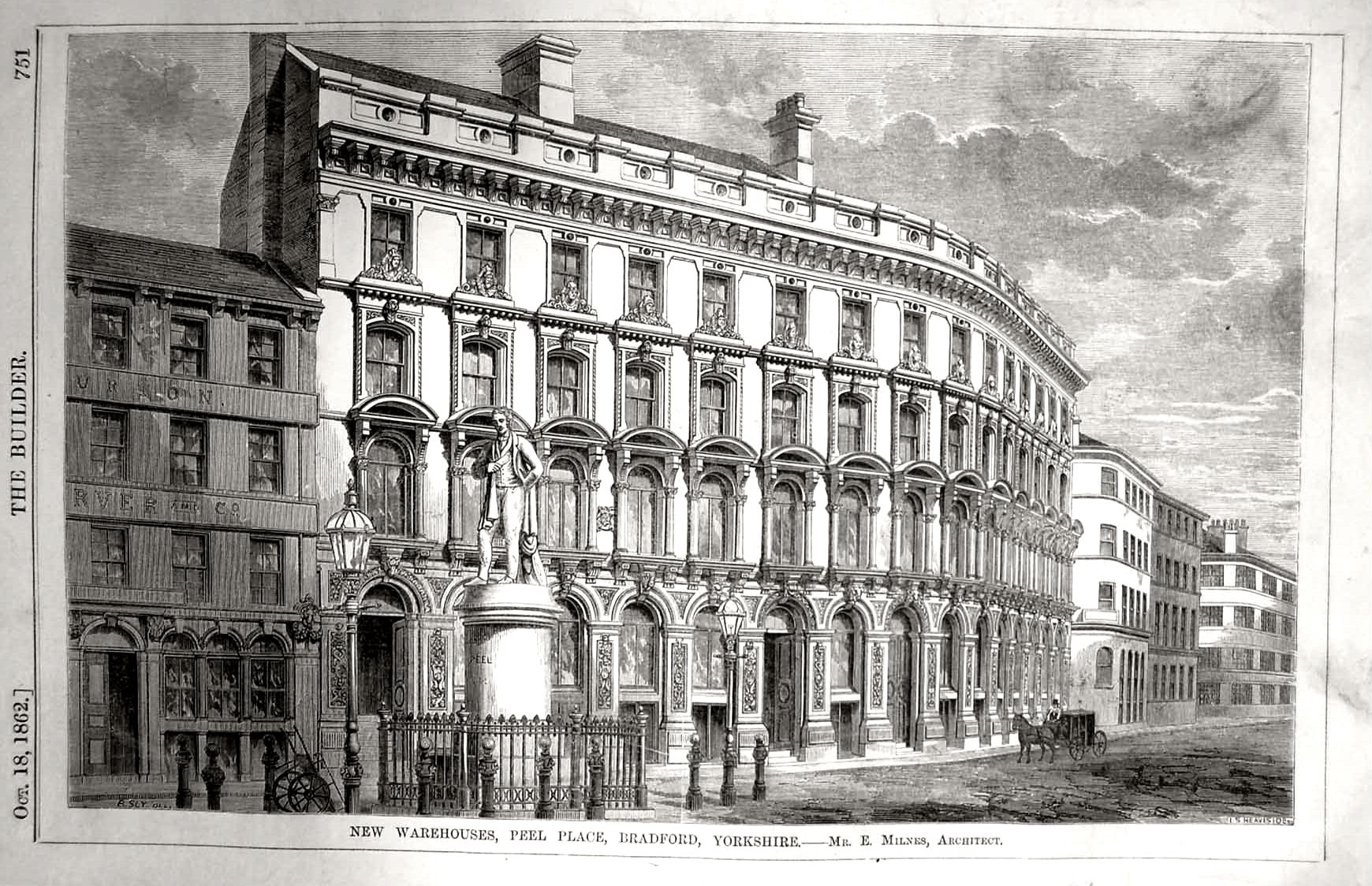
Warehouses on Peel Place designed by Eli Milnes

This was a set of warehouses designed by Eli Milnes of Bradford. They were in Peel Place and Leeds Road, Bradford, intended for the occupation of "David Abercrombie & Co. Messrs M'Kean, Tetley & Co. and others." The Bradford Observer said in 1862:

"The pile of warehouses cover a building area of about 1,200 square yards of ground. They are six stories in height, and built in the Italian renaissance style of architecture, the basements being of Bramley Fall sandstone, and the remainder of principal facade of Park Spring ashlar, highly enriched with appropriate carving, chiefly symbolical of the trade and commerce of the town ... The length of frontage to Peel Place and Leeds Road is about 160 feet ... The large warehouse in Vicar Lane, the property of and now occupied by Messrs Schwann, Kell & Co. ... is six stories in height, besides attics, and has two frontages of a plain Italian style of architecture, about 210 feet in length ... The large pile of buildings in Well Street, known as Foster's buildings ... has, during this last year, been considerably added to and improved, by the erection of three additional warehouses, which now complete the entire block, encircled by Well Street, Swaine Street, Hall Ings and Collier Gate. They are built in a bold, substantial manner, in the Italian style of architecture, and are seven storeys in height ... The carving in the whole of these buildings has been executed by Messrs. Mawer and Ingle of Leeds, from the designs of the architect, and is executed in the most artistic and creditable manner. (Bradford Observer 27 March 1862)

The warehouses were demolished and replaced by housing in the 20th century.

Media related to Warehouses in Bradford at Wikimedia Commons

=== Church of St Mary, Low Dunsforth, Boroughbridge, 1861 ===
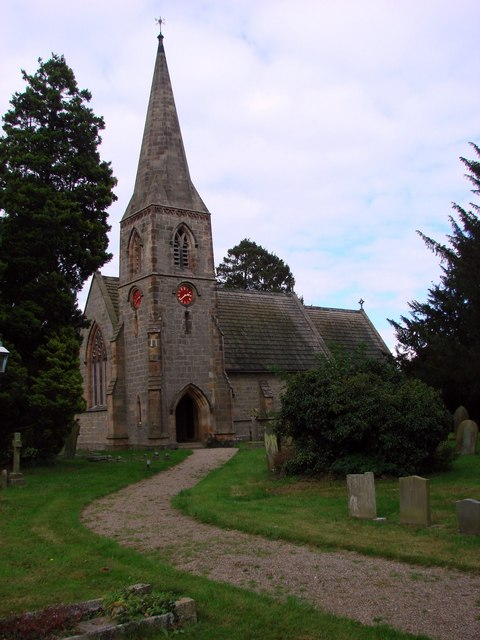
St Mary Lower Dunsforth

This is a Grade II listed building, in Lower Dunsforth. It was designed by Mallinson & Healey of Bradford, and consecrated by the Bishop of Ripon on Tuesday 24 September 1861. In 1861, the Yorkshire Gazette reported:

"The pulpit is a handsome piece of workmanship. It is of Caen stone, and rests upon a base of alabaster with marble columns. It is hexagonal in shape, and upon the six faces are the figures of St. Matthew, St. Mark, St. Luke, St. John, St. Peter and St. Paul. The desk of the pulpit is supported by an angel with clasped hands and expanded wings. The font, which is placed at the south corner of the nave, is also of Caen stone, and has a very neat appearance. It rests upon an alabaster base, with serpentine marble columns, and is in perfect keeping with the pulpit. The reredos is elaborately carved, and comprises seven niches with marble columns. It is of Caen stone. All the carved stone work is by Mawer and Ingle, of Leeds ... The windows of the chancel are filled in with stained glass from the establishment of Mr Wailes ... The church has been erected after a design by Mallinson and Healey of Bradford, architects." (Yorkshire Gazette 28 September 1861)

This building replaced an earlier Norman church, of which fragments were re-set in the new vestry in 1861. The school and master's house were built at the same time. At the consecration there were so many visitors that 200 had to wait outside during the service, although Mallinson gained admittance. As of 2017, the font, reredos and pulpit survive, although the pulpit has been lowered.

Media related to Church of St Mary Lower Dunsforth at Wikimedia Commons

=== Former St Bartholomew's, Armley, Leeds, 1861 ===
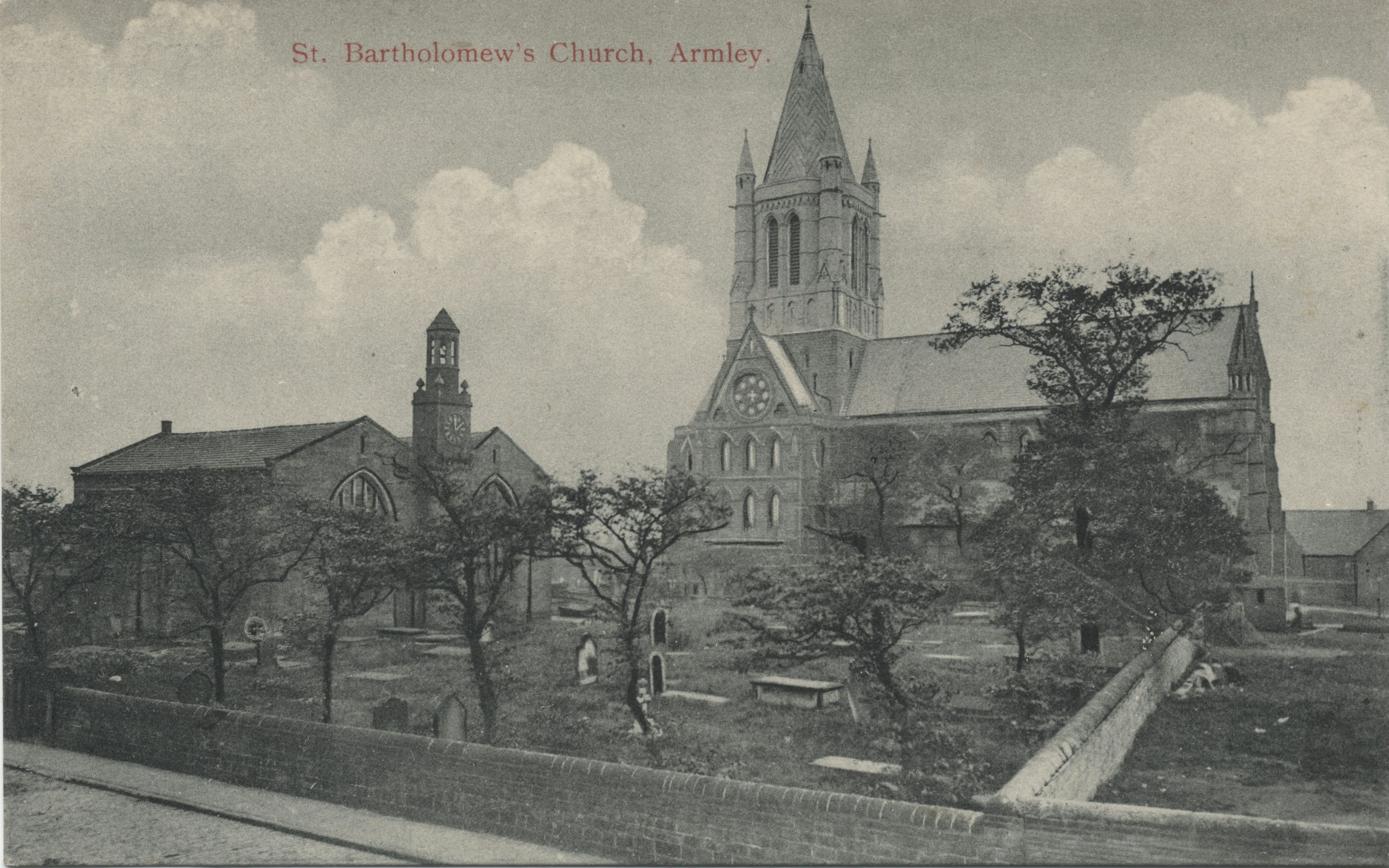
St Bartholomew (1861) is on the left

The former St Bartholomew's Chapel, Armley, was founded in 1630. It was restored by architect Thomas Armfield of Manchester, the son of incumbent, in 1861 and was demolished in 1909. The present St Bartholomew's Church which replaced it, was built in 1872–1877. Between the 1870s and 1909, the two churches existed side by side. However the pulpit in the current 1877 building may be the original 1861 Caen stone one.

The Leeds Times and Bradford Observer described the pulpit in 1861:

"... A beautiful octagon pulpit in Caen stone with marble pillars, and panels with medallions containing figures of Christ and the Evangelists in relief, carved by Messrs. Mawer and Ingle ... the designs furnished by Mr Armfield, architect, the son of the incumbent, under whose direction the whole of the restoration has been carried out." (Leeds Times 28 December 1861)

A reredos was designed in 1871 for the new St Bartholomew's, designed by Henry Walker (1844–1922) and Joseph "Josh" Athron of Leeds, but it is not known whether Mawer was employed in its execution.

Media related to Former St Bartholomews Chapel Armley at Wikimedia Commons
Media related to St Bartholomew's Church, Armley at Wikimedia Commons

=== Church of St Ricarius, Aberford, 1862 ===
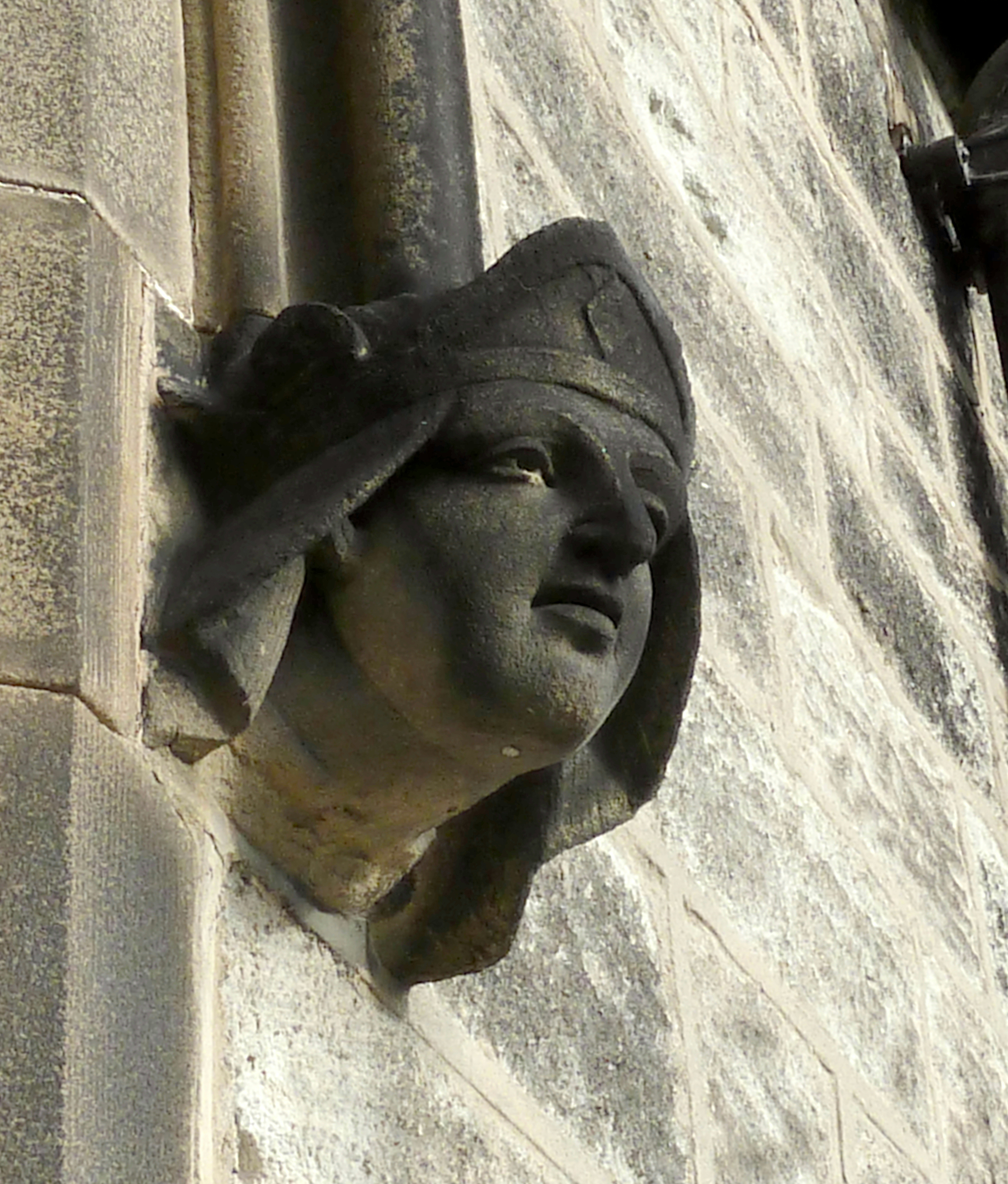
label stop head at St Ricarius

This medieval church building at Aberford near Leeds, was partly rebuilt and re-opened on 29 April 1862. The extension was consecrated by the Archbishop of York. The extension and internal reordering was designed by Anthony Salvin. North and south aisles were rebuilt, with a vestry on the north side and a porch on the south. The nave was effectively replaced in the Early Decorated style, leaving the original 800-year-old tower, and the east end which was built around 1830. A new Forster and Andrews organ was installed. The heads on the south porch represent Queen Victoria and the Archbishop of York. Samuel Hicks (1758–1829), village blacksmith of Micklefield, is represented on a window corbel; he is buried beneath the south window. The 1853 font from the previous church was installed in the present church. The walls are of Bramham Moor stone, and the window mullions and internal arches and pillars are of "stone from the Sturdy Bank quarries near Harewood". The roof is of Westmorland slates. Several windows, including the one dedicated to Hicks the blacksmith, are by Wailes, and the floor tiles are by Minton.

"On entering, a beautiful stone pulpit at once arrests the eye. The body, of a circular form is of Caen stone, supported by short pilasters of the Cornish serpentine marble. It is ... the work of Messrs Mawer & Ingle ... from a design by Mr Fowler of South Lincolnshire."

In 1862 it was supposed that the church was dedicated to St Richard, a king of the west Saxons in AD 720, and that a chancel window illustrating his life was evidence of that.
Media related to St. Ricarius Church, Aberford at Wikimedia Commons

=== Former St Matthews, Chapel Allerton, 1861-1863 ===
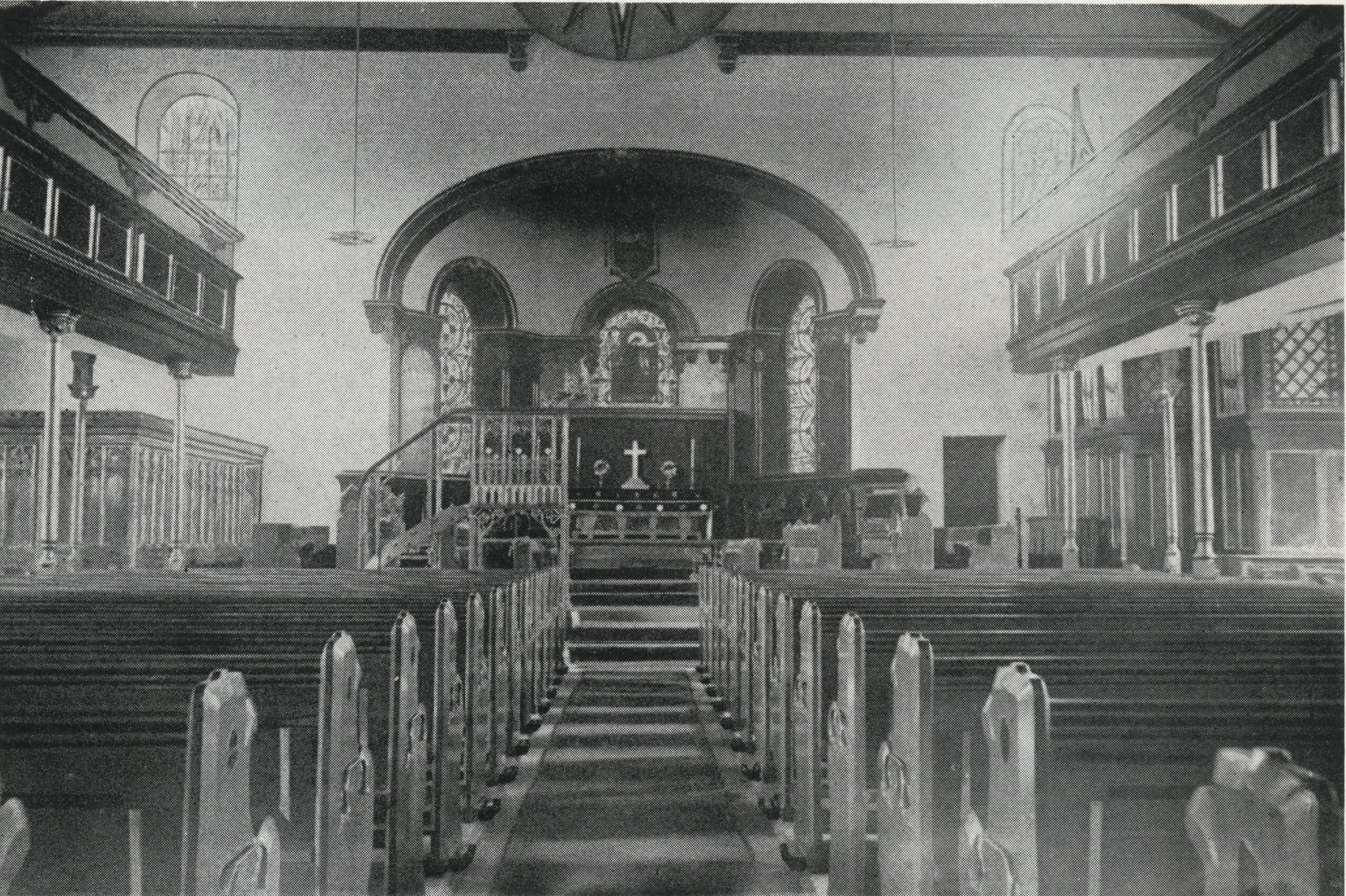
Interior of former St Matthews Chapel, 1882–1884

This was Old St Matthew's Church, Chapel Allerton, Leeds, West Yorkshire. It was built in the mid 18th century, and was replaced 1898–1900 with the current St Matthew's Church. Between 1900 and 1935 this former building was used for meetings, then became unsafe and Old St Matthew's was demolished in 1935, leaving the foundations still visible as of 2017. The present whereabouts of the carved font, reading desk and pulpit of the old church is unknown; they were not transferred to the new building. Its graveyard continued to be used, but was closed in 1974.

Between 1861 and 1862, George Corson enlarged Old St Matthews to accommodate a fast-growing population, adding transepts, chancel aisle and porch, and internally reordering it. It was reopened on Wednesday 12 November 1862. The carving in the extension was executed by Mawer & Ingle. They carved with "natural foliage" the capitals of pillars between the chancel and its new chancel aisle. In 1862, The Leeds Intelligencer reported:

"The porch has an arched doorway, with double shafts in jambs, the caps of these and the mouldings of the arch being richly carved. Above the arch the figure of St Matthew is introduced in a medallion, and the gable is crowned by a floriated cross The old pulpit has been removed, and a new one, of a most elaborate and handsome description, fills its place. This had been carved by Messrs. Mawer and Ingle, Oxford Place, and is from a design by Mr Corson ... It is hexagonal in plan, and mainly constructed of Caen stone; but the base has six shafts of Irish green marble, with delicately moulded bases and carved caps supporting the floor of the pulpit, which is carried forward externally and enriched with foliage on the angles. On this stands the upper part, each angle having a banded shaft of Irish red marble, one of these supporting the figure of the angel of St Matthew with spread wings. She shaft on either side supports handsome polished brass gas standards. The symbols of Saints Mark, Luke and John are carved in quatrefoils on the other sides of the pulpit, between the shafts. The steps up have a parapet of Caen stone with pierced quatrefoiled circles. The plain oak lectern has been discarded, and an eagle desk in Caen stone substituted. The base or pedestal of this has two shafts of Irish red marble standing in front of a stone pillar, oblong in plan, with carved caps, moulded bases &c, and is enriched with bands of glass Mosaic, by Stevens of Westminster. Floriated rods of brass are fixed to the back of the eagle, from a book rest. The eagle desk is the generous gift of the architect ... The beautiful specimens of carving the pulpit and lectern, have been executed by Messrs. Mawer and Ingle." (Leeds Intelligencer 15 November 1862)

In 1863 The Leeds Intelligencer said:

"During the present week a beautiful reading desk has been erected in this church. It will be remembered that when the church was reopened, after its enlargement last year, a pulpit and lectern, in Caen stone and marble had been given, the former by the ladies of the congregation, and the latter by Mr Corson, the architect, under whose skilful superintendence the alterations had been carried out. The old reading desk .. has been replaced by a new one in keeping with the pulpit and lectern. It consists of a moulded Caen stone base and surbase, supporting two pillasters of polished dark red Serpentine marble, and coupled polished Languedoc marble shafts with carved and foliated caps, from which spring two rich cusped arches and cusped brackets supporting the book rest. At one end of the desk a carved corbel supports a polished marble shaft with enriched cap. Upon this stands a polished brass standard for the light. Around the book rest is a border of boldly carved hawthorn leaf. The carving has been executed by Messrs. Mawer and Ingle, of Leeds, from whose hands also came the splendid pulpit and eagle ... The reading desk, which is quite a gem of art, was designed by Mr Corson." (Leeds Intelligencer 29 August 1863)

Media related to Old St Matthew's Church, Chapel Allerton at Wikimedia Commons

=== Reredos at Christ Church, High Harrogate, 1861–1862 ===
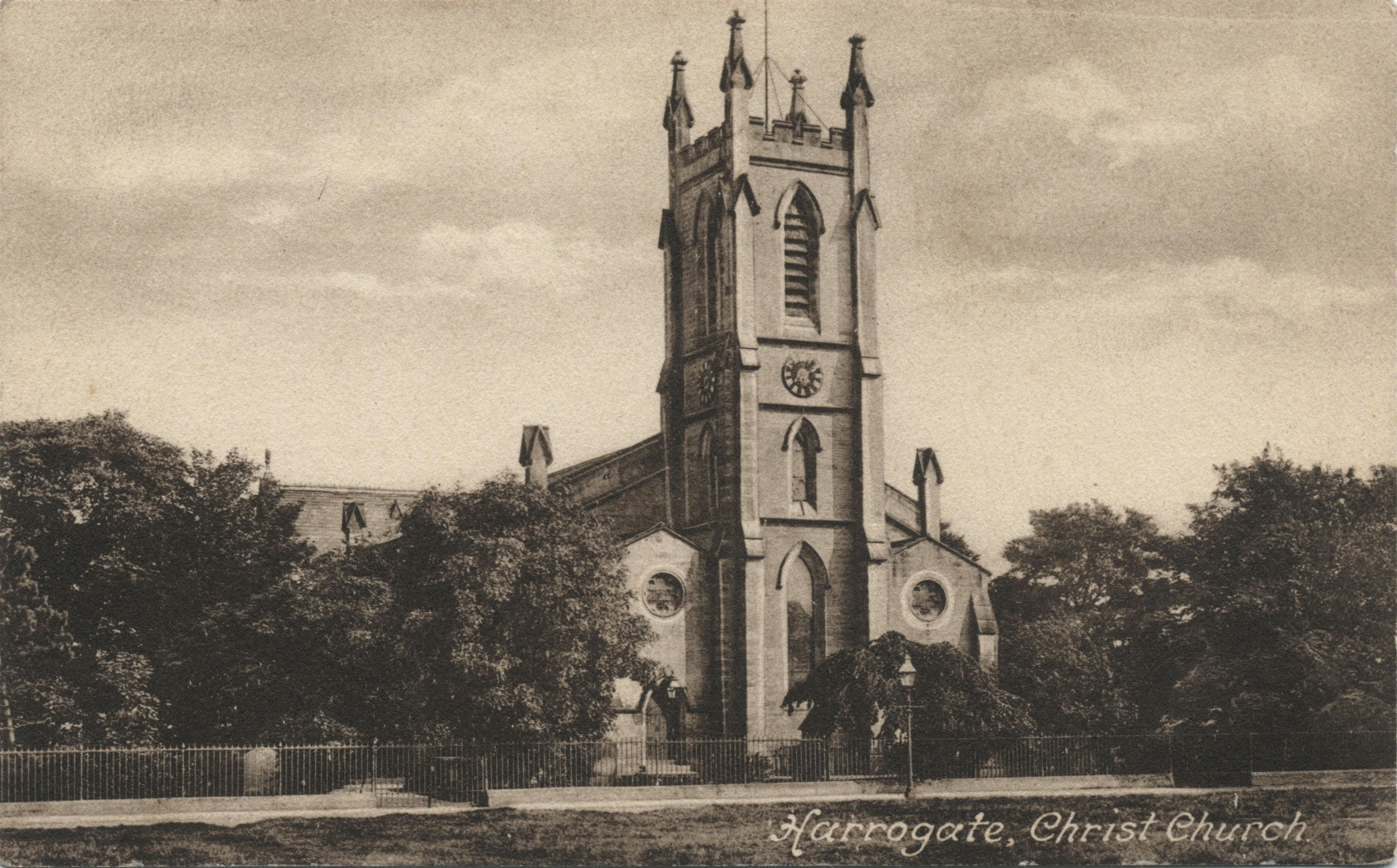
Christ Church Harrogate, before 1914

Christ Church, High Harrogate, North Yorkshire, is a Grade II listed building designed in 1831 by John Oates (1759–1818) and Thomas Pickersgill (1807–1869) of Huddersfield. Between 1861 and 1862 Lockwood and Mawson of Bradford and Leeds added transepts, a chancel, an organ chapel and a vestry. The enlargement was completed on 29 June 1862. The Yorkshire Gazette reported that this included the following carved stone elements:

"A lofty central arch, decorated and enriched, and two subordinate side arches, open out the connection between the old and new portions of the church, and the central arch is repeated at the chancel. The organ chapel also opens out into both transept and chancel by arches, well relieved by mouldings ... The wall behind the altar under the east window is covered by a handsomely carved and enriched reredos ... the reredos by Mawer and Ingle of Leeds." (Yorkshire Gazette 5 July 1862)

The architectural carving has "flowery capitals and carved heads on the corbels." The Mawer and Ingle reredos is now gone; it was replaced between 1937 and 1939 by a reredos by Comper.

Media related to Christ Church, Harrogate at Wikimedia Commons

=== Albert Memorial, Queensbury, 1863 ===
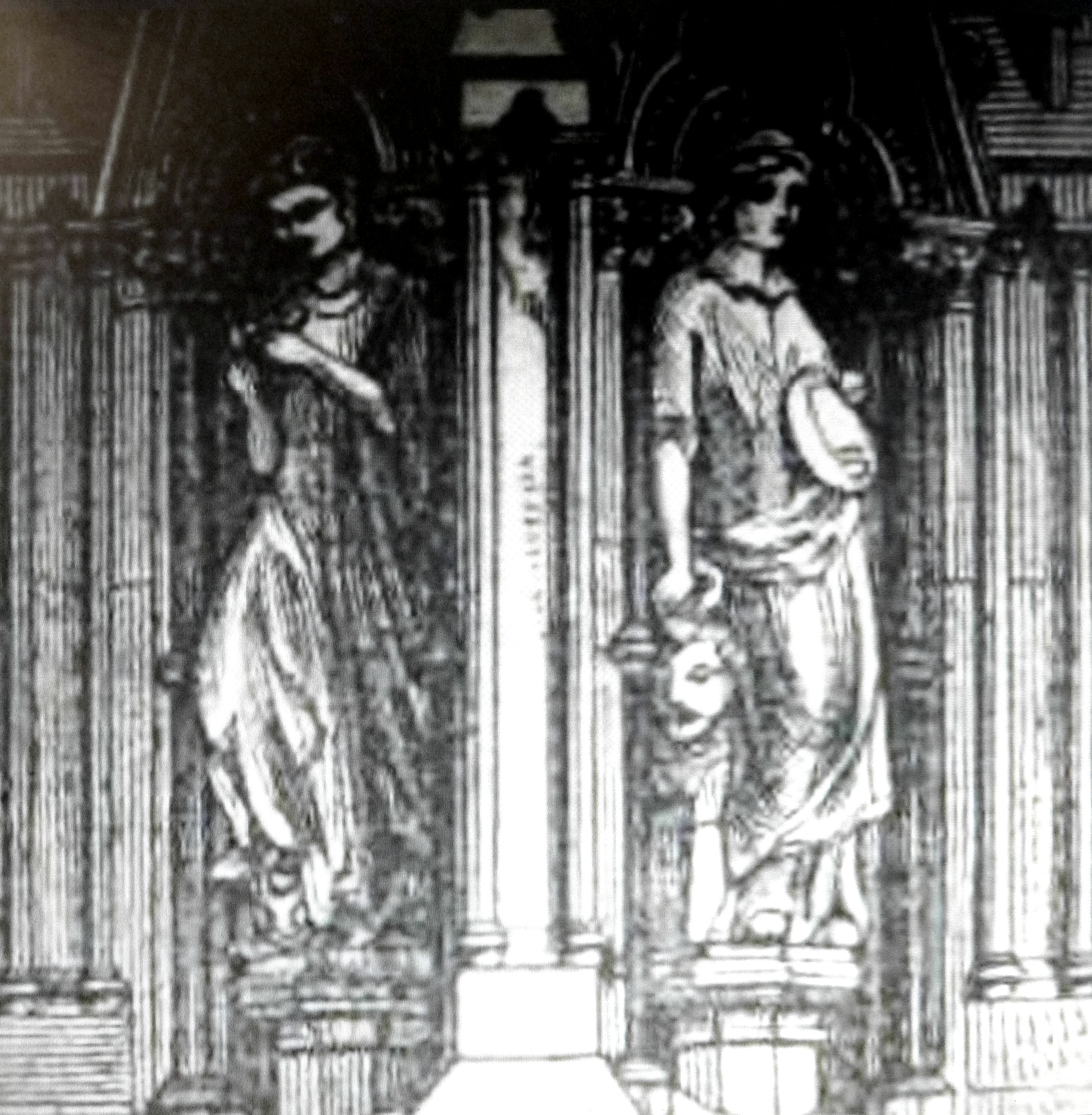
Milne's original drawing

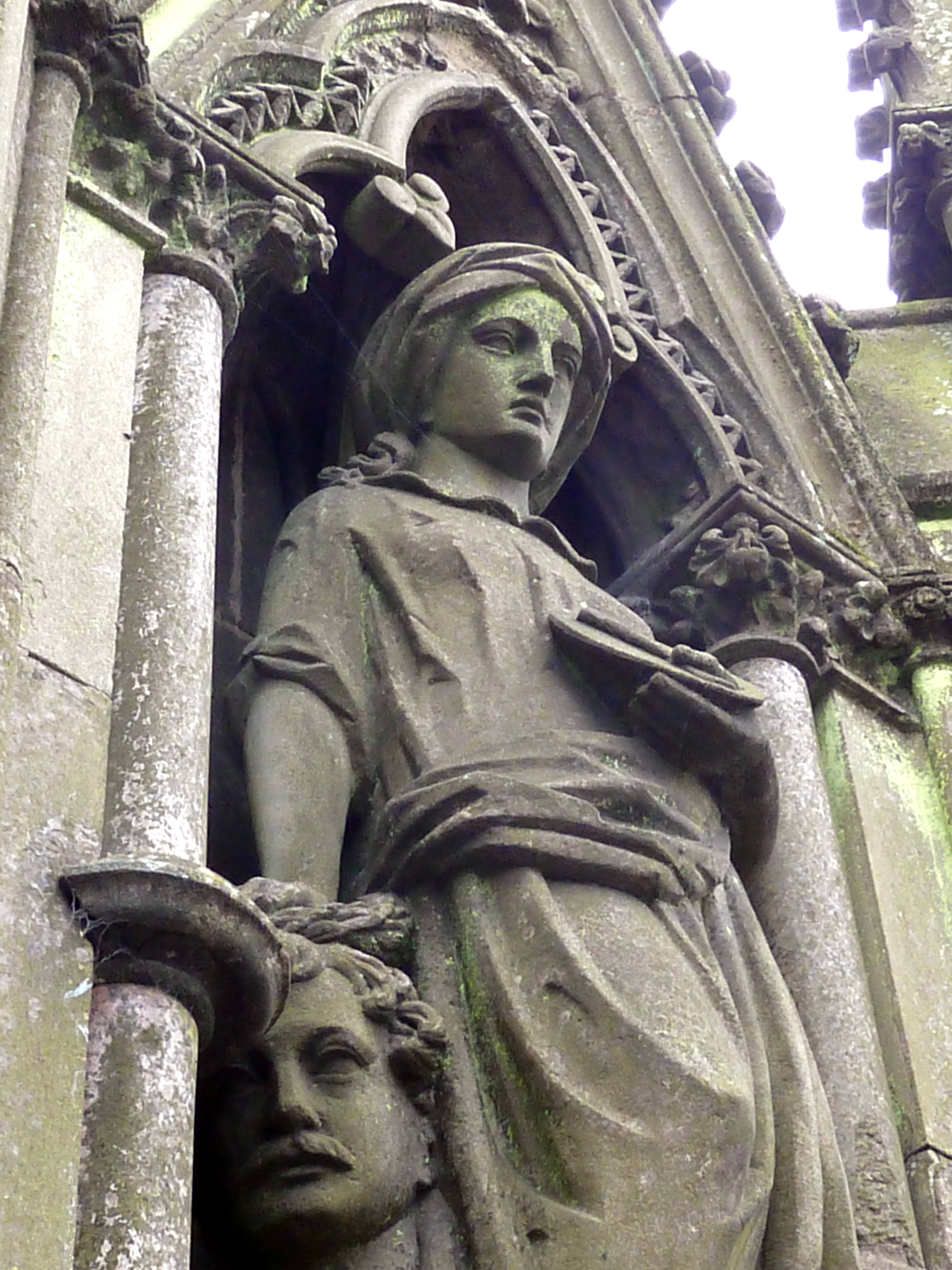
Mawer & Ingle's interpretation

This is a Grade II listed monument to Prince Albert who died in 1861. It stands, within its original surrounding wall, at the junction of Brighouse Road and High Street, Queensbury, West Yorkshire. It is made of Crosland Moor stone, from the design of architect Eli Milnes (1830–1899) of Bradford. Its inauguration on Tuesday 26 May 1863 was attended by "twelve or fourteen thousand persons ... packed together within sight of the platform," "embracing in one capacity or another the entire population of the place." "Flags and banners, some of them bearing mottoes expressive of gratitude and joy, almost choked up the way ... the day was observed as a general holiday." The monument was paid for by John Foster the Black Dyke Mills textile manufacturer, and unveiled by Colonel Edward Ackroyd of the same trade. The erstwhile village of Queenshead had just been re-established as the district of Queensbury following industrial expansion, so the monument was also a celebration of the new local identity. It was also to offer the 10,000 local inhabitants an abundant supply of domestic water, which they did not previously possess. Following the inauguration, 2,000 of Foster's workpeople were treated to luncheon in the saw mill. Next door in a tent, 300 of Foster's VIP friends received separate hospitality, while the many schoolchildren were given tea in their respective schoolrooms. Afterwards, the local people enjoyed a gala in the adjoining fields.

In 1863 the Building News and Leeds Intelligencer described the base of the monument thus:

"The architecture of the monument is Gothic, of the thirteenth century with an admixture of the foreign, of the continental element, in the details. It stands on a raised platform, four steps above the adjoining roadway, open on two sides, and enclosed in the rear semi-hexagonally by a low wall with piers, and neat iron pallisading. The total height of the monument is forty feet from the platform or ground line to the top of the finial. For the first fourteen feet in height it is square on plan, with a diagonal buttress at each angle. On the east side is a drinking fountain, of elaborately moulded and polished red granite base, shaft and basin, with a cast gun-metal capital under the latter, well undercut, carved and polished. Above the height of the basin on the east and west sides are trefoil-headed panels, filled with carvings of natural foliage, birds &c; and out of the centre of the panel on the east side issues the water for the drinking fountain. On the north and south side are similar trefoil headed panels containing engraved and illuminated gun-metal plates, - that on the north having reference to the illustrious object of the monument, in these words: "In memory of Albert, Prince Consort of Her Majesty Queen Victoria, who died December the 14th 1861. This monument was erected by John Foster & Son, Whitsuntide, 1863." Over the inscription the arms of the Prince are blazoned in their true colours, on a lozenge-shaped shield, with his crown and motto: "Treu und Fest" above. The plate on the south side contains the armorial bearings, crest and motto: "Justum perficito nihil timeto," of John Foster, Esq. Under these panels are fixed two ornamental water taps [to supply local people with free water]. The whole has been carried out from the designs and under the superintendence of Mr E. Milnes, architect, of Bradford, and executed by Messrs. Mawer and Ingle, Leeds." (Building News and The Leeds Intelligencer 29 and 30 May 1863)

The Leeds Mercury of 1863 describes the middle section of the monument:

"On each side of the monument is a semi-octagonal niche with polished Serpentine shafts at the outer angles, with carved stone capitals, from which rise corcketted canopies to the height of the open lantern under the spire. The arches and spandrels are richly carved and moulded, two of the mouldings in each of the former being enriched with the dog tooth ornament, and the heads of the niches are groined. Four draped female figures occupy these niches, representing respectively – Industry, Fine Arts, Literature and Agriculture, all so well encouraged and fostered by the Illustrious Prince during his lifetime. Above these the monument takes an octagonal form to a further height of eight feet; at each angle is a polished red Aberdeen granite shaft, bisected by a moulded stone string course, and terminated by carved capitals." (Leeds Mercury 27 May 1863)

The Illustrated London News describes the spire further:

"The lower part of the octagon [above the statues] is solid, the sides being diapered between the shafts; the upper part is open, with the exception of a single central octagonal shaft of stone which rises within the lantern thus formed to support the spire. The soffit of the lantern is groined. The granite shafts support eight trefoil arches and canopies, richly moulded, and terminating in carved finials. The spire then rises from between the canopies to a height of 17 1/2 feet, including the finial which is 2ft. 7in. long. The plan of the spire is octagonal with plain angles; the lower half being panelled on each face with trefoil head; and about midway is a moulded belt, with small trefoil sinkings. The upper part of the diagonal buttresses has, on each face, three-quarter shafts with carved capitals, supporting a small trefoil arcade, above which the buttresses shelve off into the body of the monument, and molded, crocketed pinnacles, 7ft. 4in. long, form the terminals." (Illustrated London News 18 July 1863)

The Bradford Observer said that "Mawer and Ingle of Leeds ... executed the whole (with the exception of the taps and the engraved plates, which are from the establishment of Messrs. Isaac Storey and Son, of Manchester). The push valves are on the equilibrium principle, and are the invention of Mr. Amos Hanson, Messrs. Foster's engineer."

Media related to Albert Memorial fountain, Queensbury at Wikimedia Commons
Media related to Eli Milnes at Wikimedia Commons

=== Church of St Peter, Bramley, 1861-1863 ===
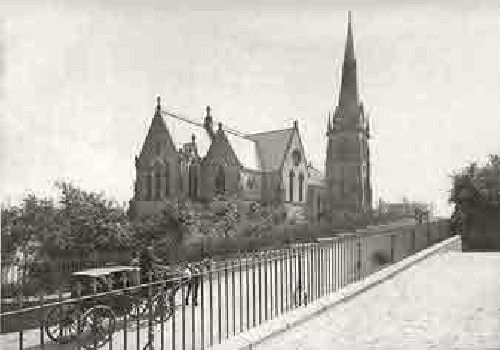
St Peter's, Bramley, before 1914

St Peter's Church, Hough Lane, Bramley, Leeds, is a Grade II listed building. The previous St Margaret's church was demolished around 1861 and rebuilt as St Peter's by Perkins & Backhouse. St Peter's foundation stone was laid in 1861, and it was consecrated on Thursday 9 July 1863. The nave and chancel were extensively rebuilt and the interior was completely replaced in the twentieth century. Only the tower is as it was in 1861; it has gargoyles and pinnacles at the angles. The east and west sides are arcaded with shafts and carved capitals, which also feature over the tower's doorway. The remains of St Margaret's steeple stand in the churchyard.

In 1863 the nave, west door and porch of St Peter's had carved capitals, and the transepts had carved capitals and corbels. The east window had carved capitals of "very fine wrought stone." The open timbers of the nave roof were supported by carved brackets. There was a "handsome Caen stone pulpit." At the consecration, the Leeds Intelligencer reported that:

"The pulpit is hexagonal, and arcaded on five of its sides, and at the angles are marble shafts, each niche contains a sculptured figure of Our Saviour and the four Evangelists. The base of the pulpit is alabaster. The usual appendage of a cushion is dispensed with and a very chaste brass book rest is substituted, which may be raised or lowered at the pleasure of the preacher ... The font is of Caen stone with clustered marble shafts and diapered bowl; it stands on two steps and forms a conspicuous object in the church ... The stone carving, which is most elaborate throughout, has been executed by Messrs. Mawer & Ingle, of Great George's Street, Leeds. It exhibits remarkable boldness and skill in ecclesiastical ornamentation, and reflects much credit upon the architects, from whose designs the work has been carried out." (Leeds Intelligencer 11 July 1863)

Media related to St Peter's Church, Bramley at Wikimedia Commons

=== Hepper & Sons auctioneers sales rooms and offices, East Parade, Leeds 1863 ===
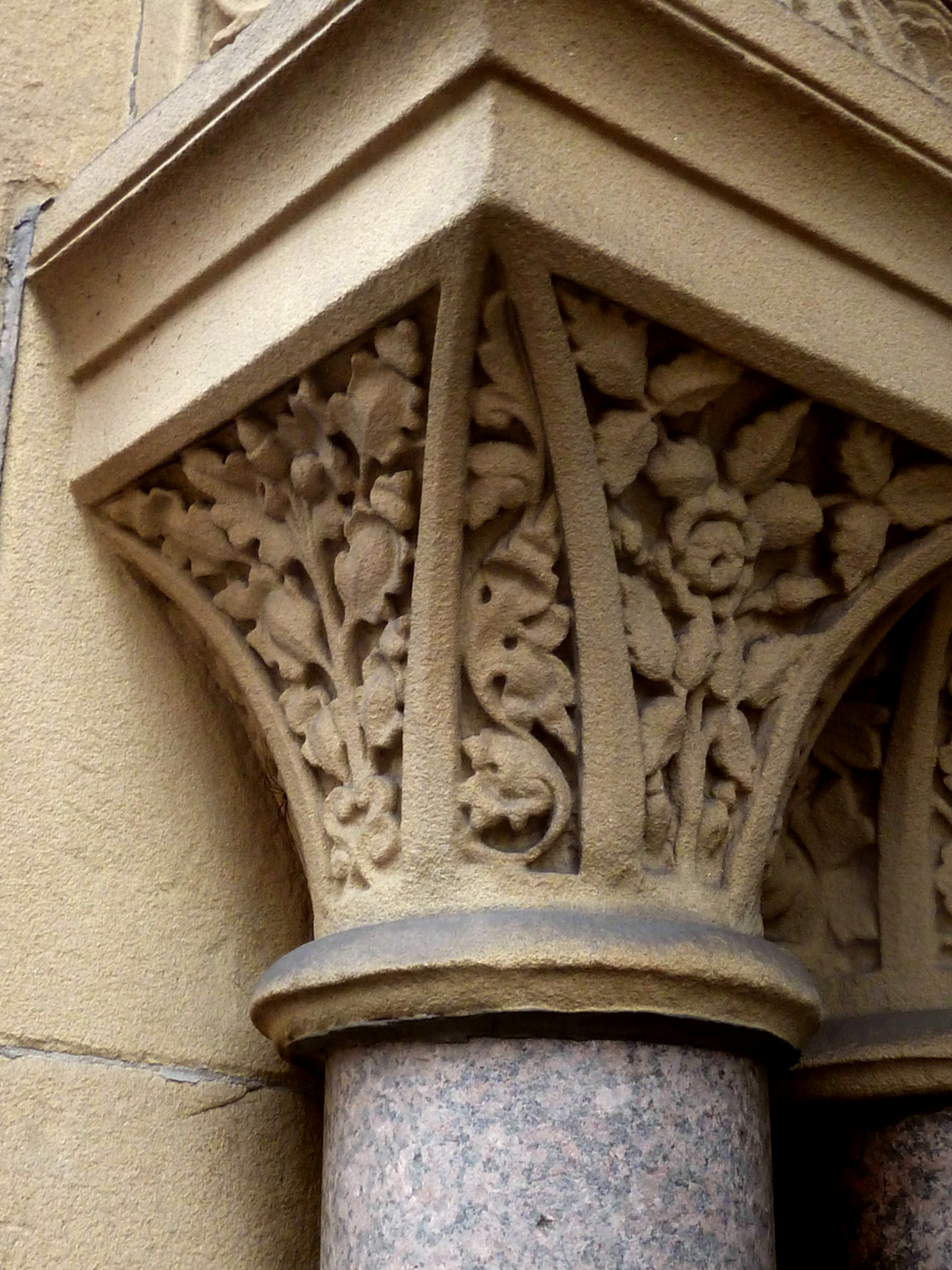
Capital, at Hepper House

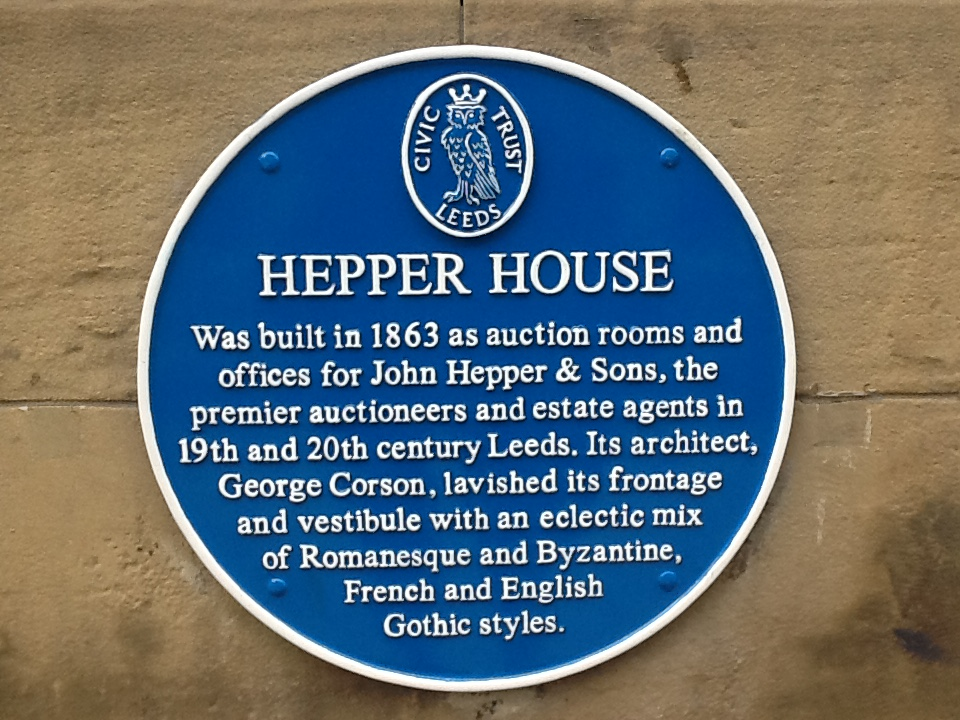
Hepper House Blue Plaque

This is a Grade II listed building, at 17a East Parade, Leeds. It was designed by George Corson, and completed in December 1863. It is now named Hepper House, inhabited previously by Bonhams; as of 2016 by Iberica restaurant. In 1863, the Leeds Times said:

"On one side is the porch, double-arched, supported by polished red granite shafts enclosed in a large arch. At the ground line are two double windows, giving light to the dining rooms on the basement floor, above which are the double windows of the private office, with arches slightly horseshoe in form, and supported by shafts of polished red granite. Round the arches is a carved hoodmould. Between the first windows and those above is a carved dado, in panels, upon which rest the piers dividing the windows which light the estate room and stair. On the angles of the piers are shafts, of serpentine marble, in two heights, divided by a band of red stone, and with carved caps, the piers having carved imposts. The windows have pointed heads, and are worked with carved mouldings. Over the windows is a carved hoodmould ... All the front is of white stone from the neighbourhood of Leeds. Use is made of red stone from Ripon, in bands and voussoirs ... The architect is Mr. George Corson, of South Parade, and the carving, treated conventionally, is supplied by Messrs. Mawer and Ingle, of Leeds." (Leeds Times 5 December 1853)

Media related to Hepper House, East Parade, Leeds at Wikimedia Commons

=== Warehouses, 30 Park Place, Leeds, 1865 ===
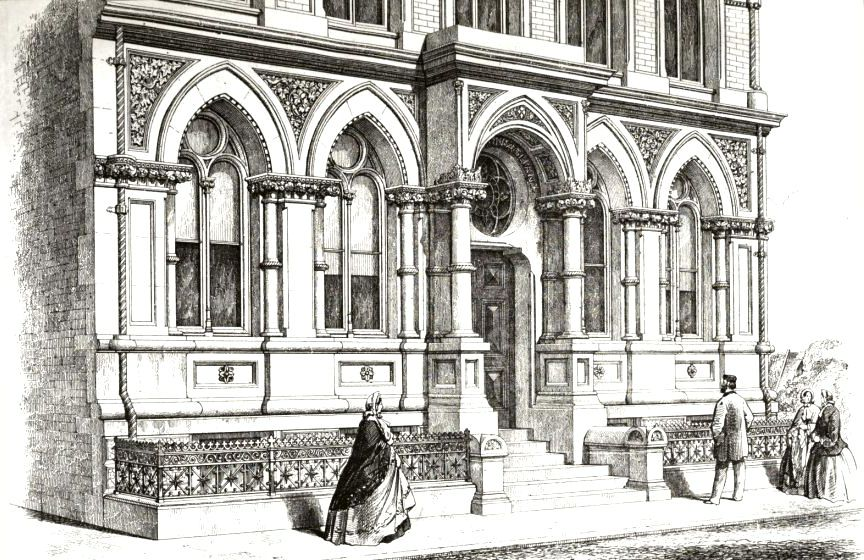
30 Park Place, 1865

This building at 30 Park Place, Leeds, is not listed. It was designed by Thomas Ambler of Park Row, Leeds as a warehouse for NP and H Nathan, and completed in 1865. Mawer and Ingle supplied granite and carving. As of 2007 it is a hotel called The Chambers. It has panels and capitals of carved leaves, with animals hidden amongst the foliage. The Building News said in 1865:

"The facade is built with stone up to the first-floor string, with polished granite shafts to the windows and doorway; the remainder of the front is pressed with faced brickwork, and stone dressings of a plainer character."

Media related to 30 Park Place, Leeds at Wikimedia Commons

=== Endcliffe Hall, Sheffield, 1863–1865 ===
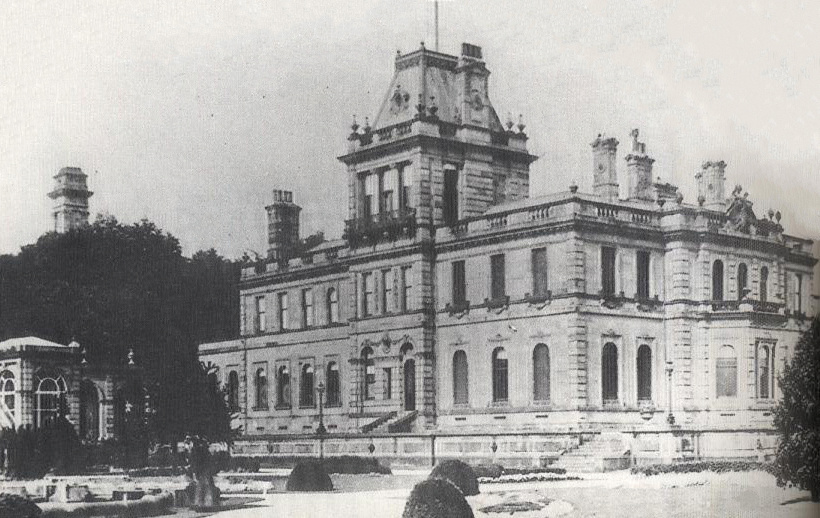
Endcliffe Hall, circa 1865

Endcliffe Hall in Endlcliffe, Sheffield, is a Grade II* listed building, built for steel manufacturer Sir John Brown. It was designed by Flockton and Abbott, the foundation stone was laid on Monday 9 November 1863, and it was completed in 1865. As of 2017 the building was managed as a conference venue by The Reserve Forces’ and Cadets’ Association for Yorkshire and The Humber. It has Four Seasons statues by Edward William Wyon (1811–1885) above the porch, and a pair of Labour and Art figures over the front pediment by John Woody Papworth. The chimney pieces are by Hadfield. All other architectural stone carving is by Mawer and Ingle. In 1865, the Sheffield Independent said:

"The general style of architecture is Italian, of a character particularly susceptible of elaborate ornamentation ... the columns which support the landing gallery [above the grand double staircase] are beautifully carved ... Taking an exterior view of the mansion ... the architect has called in the aid of the sculptor to give a finish to his work ... The stone carving has been executed by Messrs. Mawer and Ingle of Leeds." (Sheffield Independent 26 May 1865)

In the same year, the Sheffield Daily Telegraph said:

"Some very fine sculpture adorns the front of the edifice and the terraces .. The mouldings, carvings, balustrades etc. are all highly finished, and make a telling, judicious and appropriate relief to the architectural features ... The stone carving has been executed by Messrs. Mawer and Ingle of Leeds." (Sheffield Daily Telegraph 24 May 1865)

Media related to Endcliffe Hall at Wikimedia Commons

=== Former St John the Evangelist, Wortley, Leeds, 1864–1865 ===
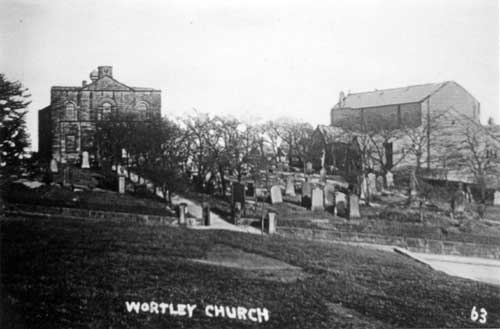
Former St John's, on left, ca.1899

The former Church of St John the Evangelist stood on Dixon Lane Road, Wortley, Leeds. It was replaced in 1898 by a new St John which is still in use, and the two existed side by side for some time. The former building was designed by Dobson & Chorley and completed in 1853; Robert Mawer executed the general carving on the original building, and Mawer and Ingle supplied its Caen stone reredos in 1864–1865.

The Leeds Intelligencer said of the former building: "Since the commemoration services of 1864, the church has been enriched by the erection of a handsome reredos in Caen stone, purchased at the cost of the congregation, and executed by Messrs. Mawer and Ingle, under the direction of Messrs. Dobson & Chorley, architects."

Media related to Church of St John the Evangelist, Wortley at Wikimedia Commons

=== Former Holy Trinity, Louth, 1866 ===
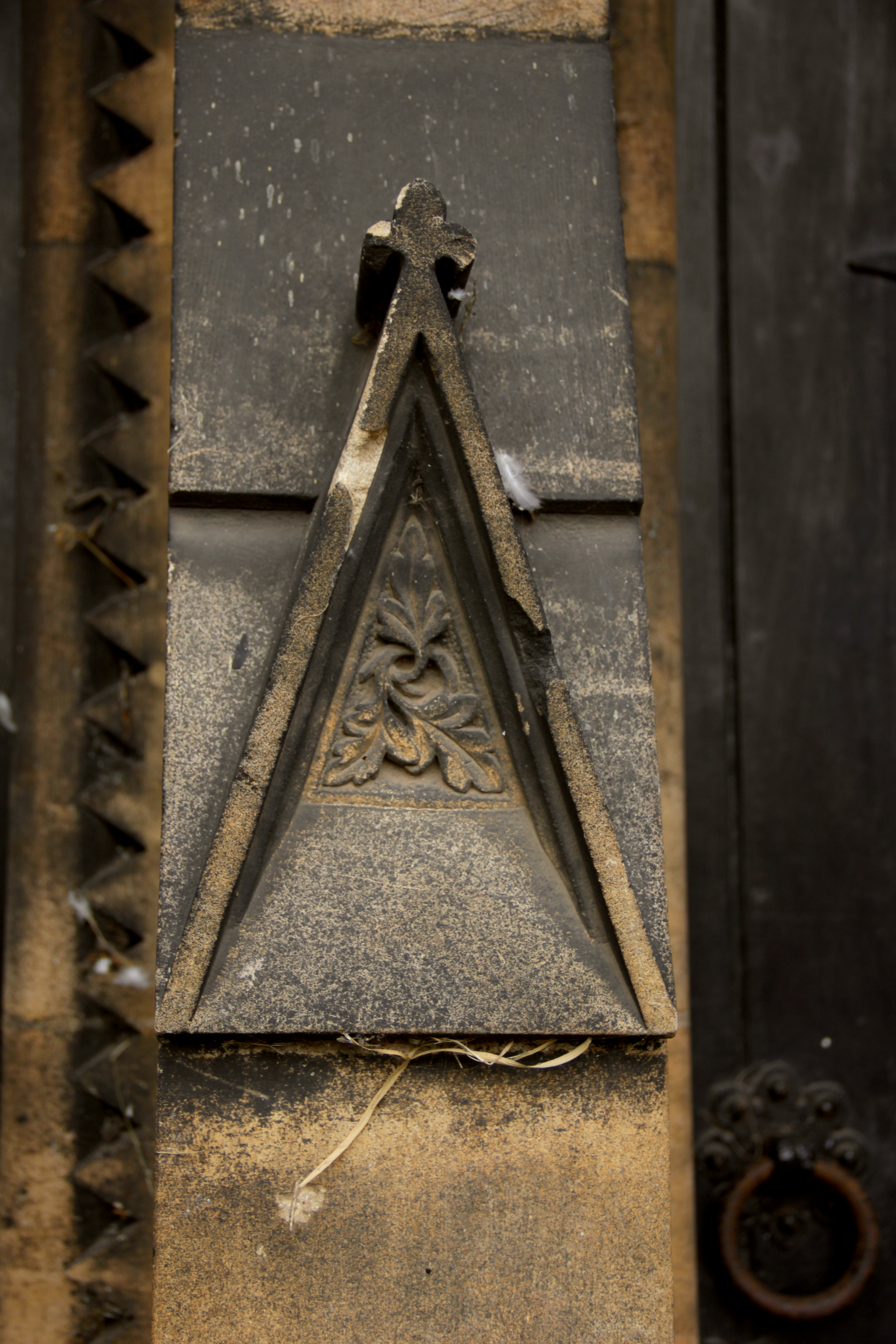
An unusual bit of carving in the tower doorway, reminiscent of the masonic symbol

The former Church of the Holy Trinity on Eastgate, Louth, Lincolnshire, was designed by C. Rogers and Marsden of Louth, who also designed Louth Market Hall. The church was consecrated on 5 April 1866, although it was completed "several years" before that. The nave burned down in 1991, but the tower remains. The nave was replaced in 1997–1998 by the Trinity Centre.

In 1866 the Stamford Mercury described the carved stone elements as follows:

The double chancel arch was of two orders, "the inner order being supported n corbels, of which the carving is very beautiful ... the carving, executed by Mawer & Ingle, of Leeds, is a mixture of natural and conventional foliage." The nave arches had "carved capitals, the foliage springing in each case from the hollows of the quatrefoils, and embracing the bell of the capital on each side ... The pulpit, with square base of Yorkshire stone, with dog tooth worked on the upper moulding, circular shaft of red Mansfield stone, supporting a square capital carved in conventional foliage; the upper part of Caen stone with square sides and slightly curved fronts, with moulded arch panelling, and trails of dog-tooth introduced in the angles and hollows, and finished with a moulded cornice." (Stamford Mercury 13 April 1866)

In the same year the Lincolnshire Chronicle and the Louth and North Lincolnshire Advertiser said:

The bareness of the new edifice "tends to throw the carving into prominence and bold relief, and well it deserves to be so, for rarely have graceful designs been more skilfully chiselled by the hand of the carver." The chancel arch rested on "beautifully carved capitals, springing from clustered shafts, with moulded bases. The chamfer stops on each side are beautifully finished, with conventional foliage." The east window had "a moulded inner arch, and hood mould with carved bosses representing the vine on one side and wheat on the other. The carving deserves special mention, being executed by Messrs. Mawer & Tugle (sic) of Leeds ... The carving is an intermixture of the conventional and natural types arranged from sketches by the architects. Our readers will readily recognise on the south side of the nave, blackberry, rose, lily, fern, columbine and primula; on the north side, sycamore, oak, bindweed, apple, polypody and fern. The dove and other birds are also introduced." (Lincolnshire Chronicle 14 April 1866, and Louth and North Lincolnshire Advertiser 7 April 1866)

Media related to Holy Trinity Church, Louth at Wikimedia Commons (No modern image of Holy Trinity on Commons)

=== Memorial tablet at Holy Trinity, Low Moor, Bradford, 1866 ===
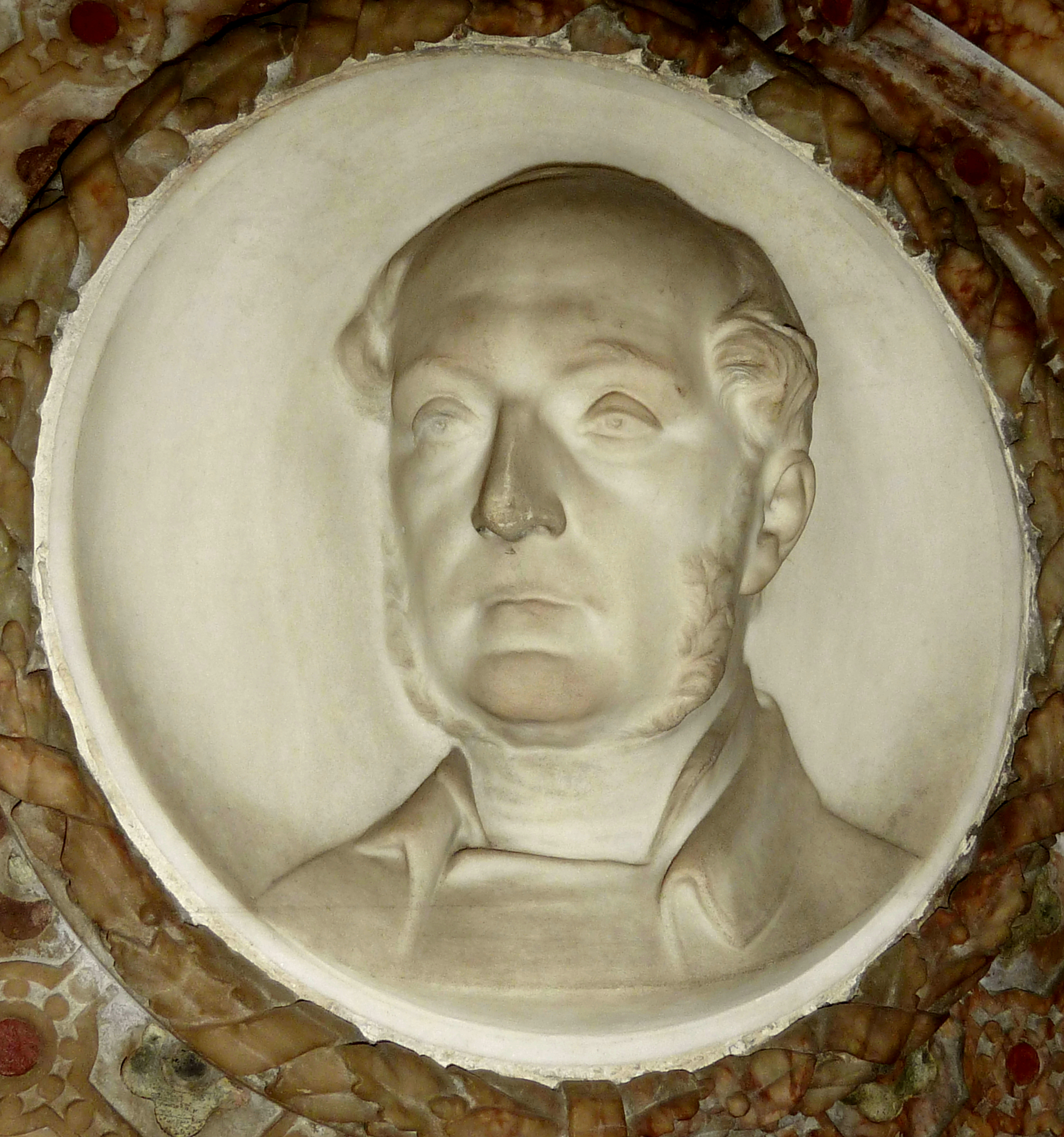
Portrait of Fawcett by Mawer & Ingle

Holy Trinity Church, the parish church of Low Moor, Bradford, is a Grade II listed building, founded in 1606 as Wibsey Chapel. The building was rebuilt and enlarged in 1836 by architects R.S. and S. Sharpe, then in 1883 the chancel was remodelled and the furnishings re-ordered.

Reverend Joshua Fawcett, M.A. was the son of Richard Fawcett, who had been the "head of the worsted trade" in Bradford. He attended Clapham Grammar School and Trinity College, Cambridge, and became Wibsey Chapel's incumbent in 1833. He was given the post-mortem title of Honorary Canon of Ripon Cathedral in 1864. After his sudden death in 1864 of apoplexy, "A subscription was opened for the purpose of erecting a monument to perpetuate his memory ... a tablet of Derbyshire alabaster, highly enriched with inlaid marble, &c., having been placed on the north side of Holy Trinity Church. The design is by Messrs. Mallinson & Healey, of Bradford, whose services were offered gratuitously; and the work has been elaborately executed by Messrs. Mawer & Ingle, of Leeds." His parishioners had subscribed to this "to record his unwearied zeal and affectionate pastoral care during the 32 years of his ministry."

The Bradford Observer and Yorkshire Post said that he "would long be remembered with deep respect by thousands." It described the monument as a "large massive marble tablet ... the design ... is an admirable one."

At his funeral, Fawcett was mourned by a "vast concourse of persons," and many clergy and VIPs joined the procession which followed the funeral cortege. At the service, the church was "densely crowded." He was buried in a "massive oak coffin" in a vault at the east end of Holy Trinity's churchyard.

Media related to Holy Trinity Low Moor, Joshua Fawcett memorial at Wikimedia Commons

=== Wool Exchange, Bradford, 1864-1867 ===
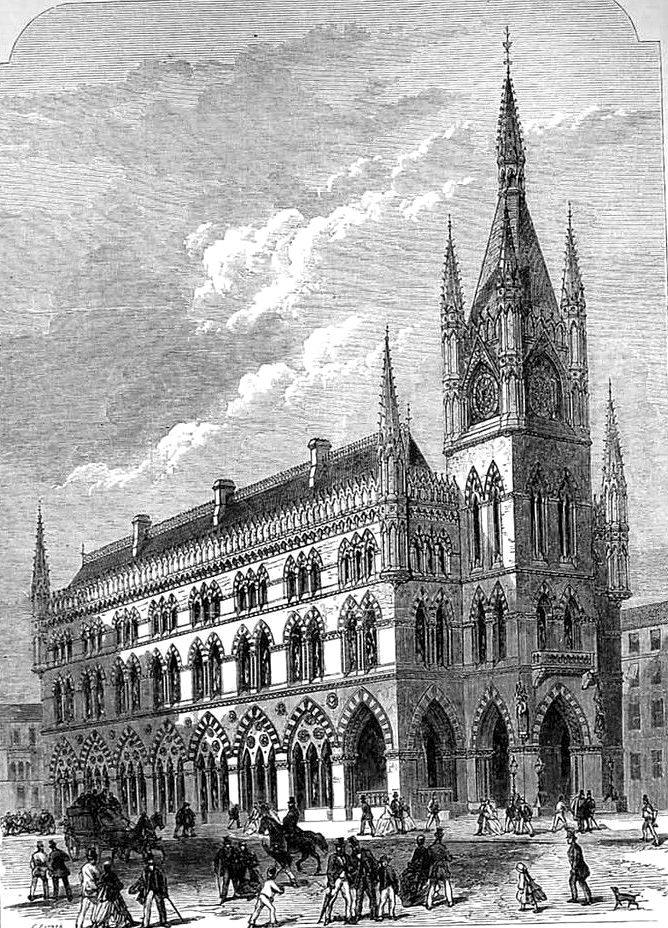
Wool Exchange in 1867

The Wool Exchange, Bradford, is a Grade I listed building. It was designed in Venetian Gothic style by Henry Francis Lockwood and William Mawson, and the foundation stone was laid on Tuesday 9 August 1864 by Lord Palmerston. It was formally opened on Wednesday 13 March 1867. It was described with tongue in cheek by the Manchester Times in 1867 as "a large ecclesiastical looking edifice in the Gothic style, with an episcopal statue on one side of the entrance, a crowned figure on the other." Originally there was carving in the tops of the arches on the Market Street side: "The front of the building in Market Street is divided into shops, with each occupying one of the large arches ... the windows occupy two compartments and the door the third, the top being filled with carved work." This original carved work is now replaced with glass. The Leeds Mercury and the Illustrated London News said that "The centre compartment of the main hall is supported by eighteen large polished shafts of red granite, two feet in diameter, with beautifully carved capitals."

On 29 September 1866, the Leeds Times observed: "On the walls above, the sculptors are busily employed in finishing their carved ornamentation and giving all a kind of mediaeval aspect, as unlike as possible - a few churches excepted - most of the architecture in the town ... Several workmen are engaged upon the spire." There was a topping out ceremony for the artisans: "On Monday [26 November 1866] a flag waved triumphantly from the highest point of our New Exchange, namely, the top of the tapering spire and tower ... The men engaged upon it we understand were treated to a glass or two of champagne at the top." James Tolmie (1826–1866) executed the figures of Bishop Blaise patron saint of woolcombers, and Edward III who granted Bradford's trading charter, at the entrance beneath the tower, but died suddenly, leaving them unfinished, and no evidence has been found that he did further work on the building. Mawer & Ingle carried out the remaining carving on the Exchange. According to the Bradford Observer on 17 January 1867, they were still carving the medallions which were:

"now being sculptured along the front of the Exchange ... That the Exchange is an object of interest to our townsmen is proved by the numbers who almost any day may be seen watching the skilled craftsmen who are engaged in the carvings ... These enrichments are indeed as beautiful as they are appropriate ... Next to the tower in the place of honour on the Market Street front, the head of Cobden is appropriately placed. It is a tolerably good portrait and well executed, but rather too full in the face; and next to that is a finely-chiselled head of Sir Titus Salt, Esq. These are all that are finished on this front, but heads of Stephenson and Watt are partly completed and there are to follow in order Arkwright, Jacquard, Gladstone and Palmerston. Along the Bank Street front the heads already finished are those of Sir Walter Raleigh, Drake and Columbus; and those are to be supplemented by Captain Cook and Commodore Anson ... [The two statues by Tolmie were not yet in place.] The other carvings on the pillars at the entrance under the tower are very beautiful; and the carvings along the string courses a great relief to the solid massiveness of the building." (Bradford Observer 17 January 1867)

According to Historic England, the medallions facing Market Street show Richard Cobden, Titus Salt, George Stephenson, James Watt, Richard Arkwright, Joseph Marie Jacquard, William Gladstone and Lord Palmerston (although the Leeds Times said in 1867 that it was "Mr. Bright, MP, a well-executed likeness"). Those facing Bank Street show Walter Raleigh, Francis Drake, Christopher Columbus, James Cook and George Anson.

Media related to Wool Exchange, Bradford at Wikimedia Commons

=== Statues of Sweep and Shoeblack, originally in Peel Park, Bradford, 1867 ===
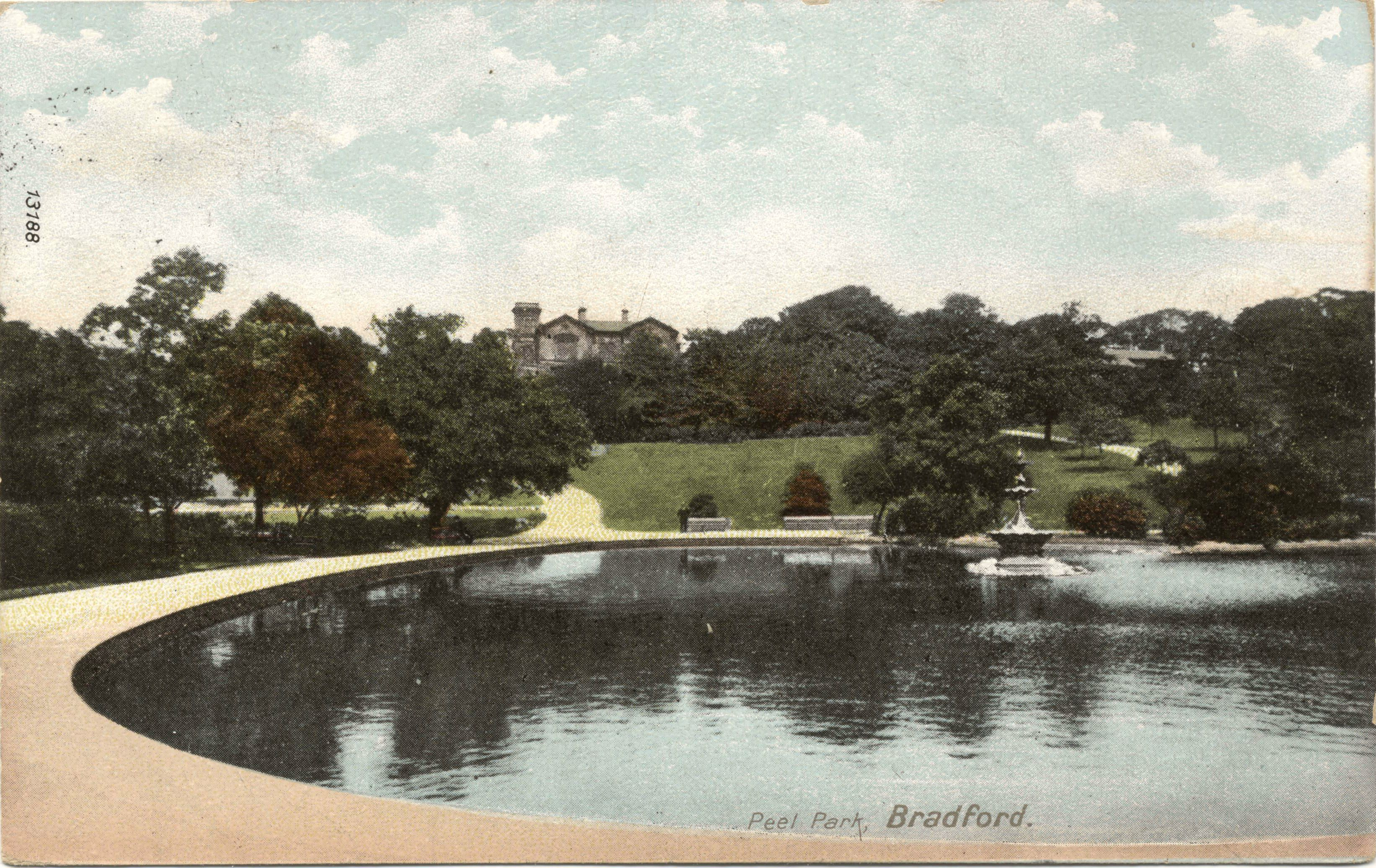
Peel Park, Bradford, in 1905

The present whereabouts of the Sweep and Shoeblack statues is unknown. Peel Park, Bradford, and its remaining three statues of Peel, Spring and Autumn are Grade II* listed. Although the park was opened in 1846, it had "next to no specimens of British statuary" until in 1867 Henry Pullan of the Music Hall, Westgate, Bradford, donated two small, painted stone statues. They were placed nearly opposite each other on the grand terrace in the park. In the same year, the Leeds Times described them as follows:

"The statue of the "sweep," ... with the first square of the pedestal, was chiselled from a mass of solid building stone, at the works of Messrs. Mawer and Ingle, sculptors, Leeds, whose artistic excellence have been proved in the carvings adorning our new Exchange. The sweep, in his sooty costume, the red lips contrasting finely with the black, is comparatively small in bulk, and some might think that it is rough and unfinished, but the whole is full of expression, and we seem almost to hear the "darkey," with brush in hand, crying out, "Sweep." The companion statue to this, that of a shoeblack, with box and brushes slung over one shoulder, while he points to your boots with the dexter-finger of the right hand, has been well-executed by the same sculptors." (Leeds Times 8 May 1867)

These are no longer in the same park, but there was once a pair of statues of the same description on the eastern terrace of Peel Park, Salford. Some major sculptures which had been removed from Peel Park, Salford, to storage in 1954, were sold in 1969 to Gawsworth Old Hall; and the sweep and bootblack sculptures disappeared at the same time. However they were not purchased by Gawsworth Old Hall.

Media related to Peel Park, Bradford at Wikimedia Commons
Media related to Peel Park, Salford at Wikimedia Commons

=== Former Church of St Peter, Dewsbury Road, Hunslet Moor, 1866-1868 ===
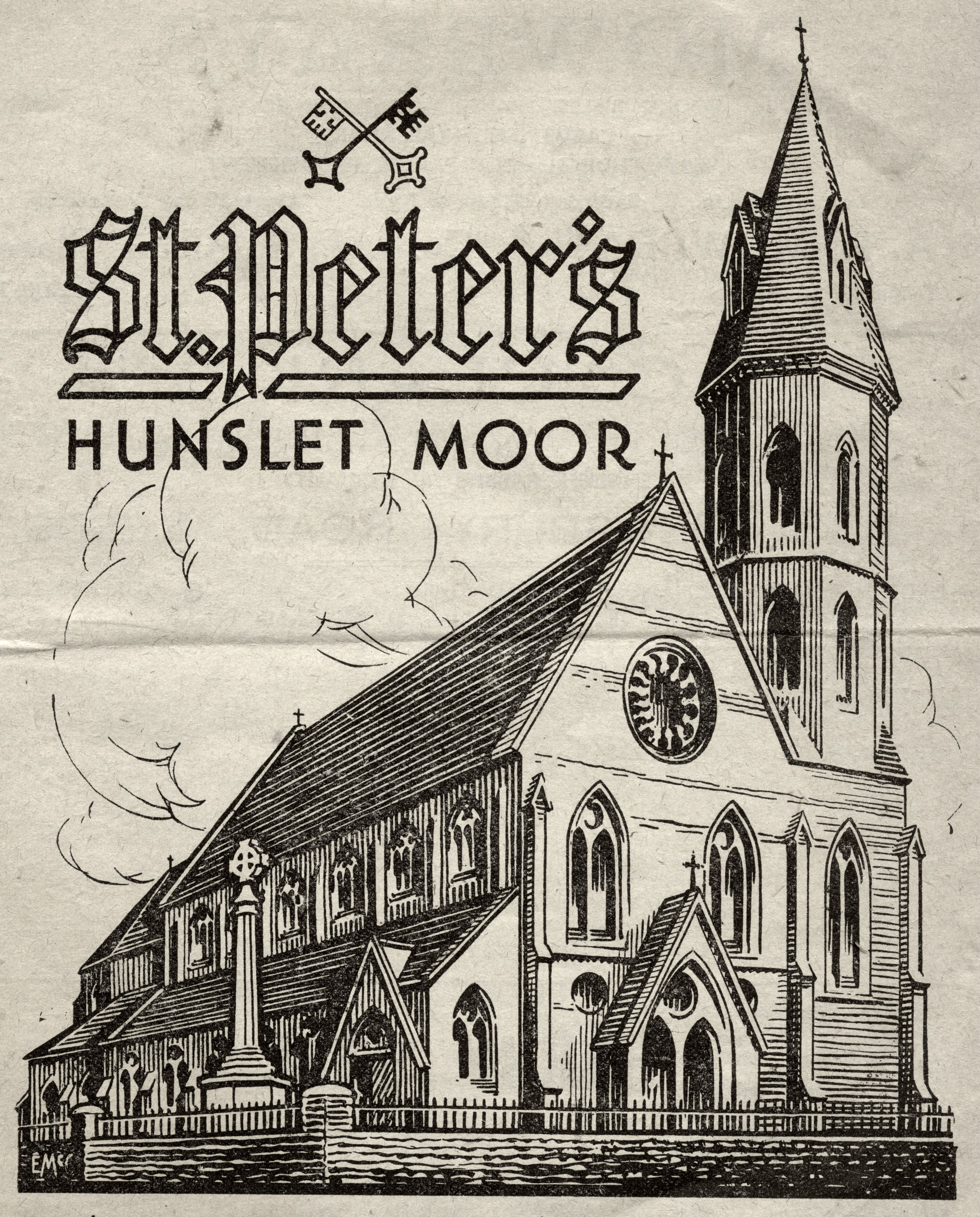
St Peters parish magazine, 1946

St Peter's, Dewsbury Road, Hunslet Moor was founded by Leeds Church Extension Society, and designed by William Perkin (d.1874) & Son of Leeds. The foundation stone was laid on Thursday 10 May 1866, and the church was consecrated on 2 July 1868. It was built of brick and stone, with white sandstone dressings, and had a 128 ft (38m) spire. It was demolished in the 20th century and replaced by flats in St Peter's Court.

"There is a pleasing porch, having a central circular shaft of Rotherham stone, with a moulded vase and carved capital, the entrance being flanked with similar columns, and the angle being flanked with a carved stone cross ... Inside, the aisles are divided from the nave by two fine arcades of arches, which spring from massive columns having central dog-tooth bands, moulded bases and carved capitals. An ornament is introduced into the springers and keystones which has a very novel and pleasing effect. It consists of an incised scroll filled in with black cement, and the effect is still further increased by a band of black bricks, which runs round each arch, the latter being constructed of voussoirs of red and white bricks alternately ... The windows are divided with circular shafts which spring from carved bosses ... Messrs Ingle and Mawer, stone carvers."

Media related to St Peter's church, Hunslet Moor at Wikimedia Commons

=== Commercial Bank, Bradford, 1867-1868 ===
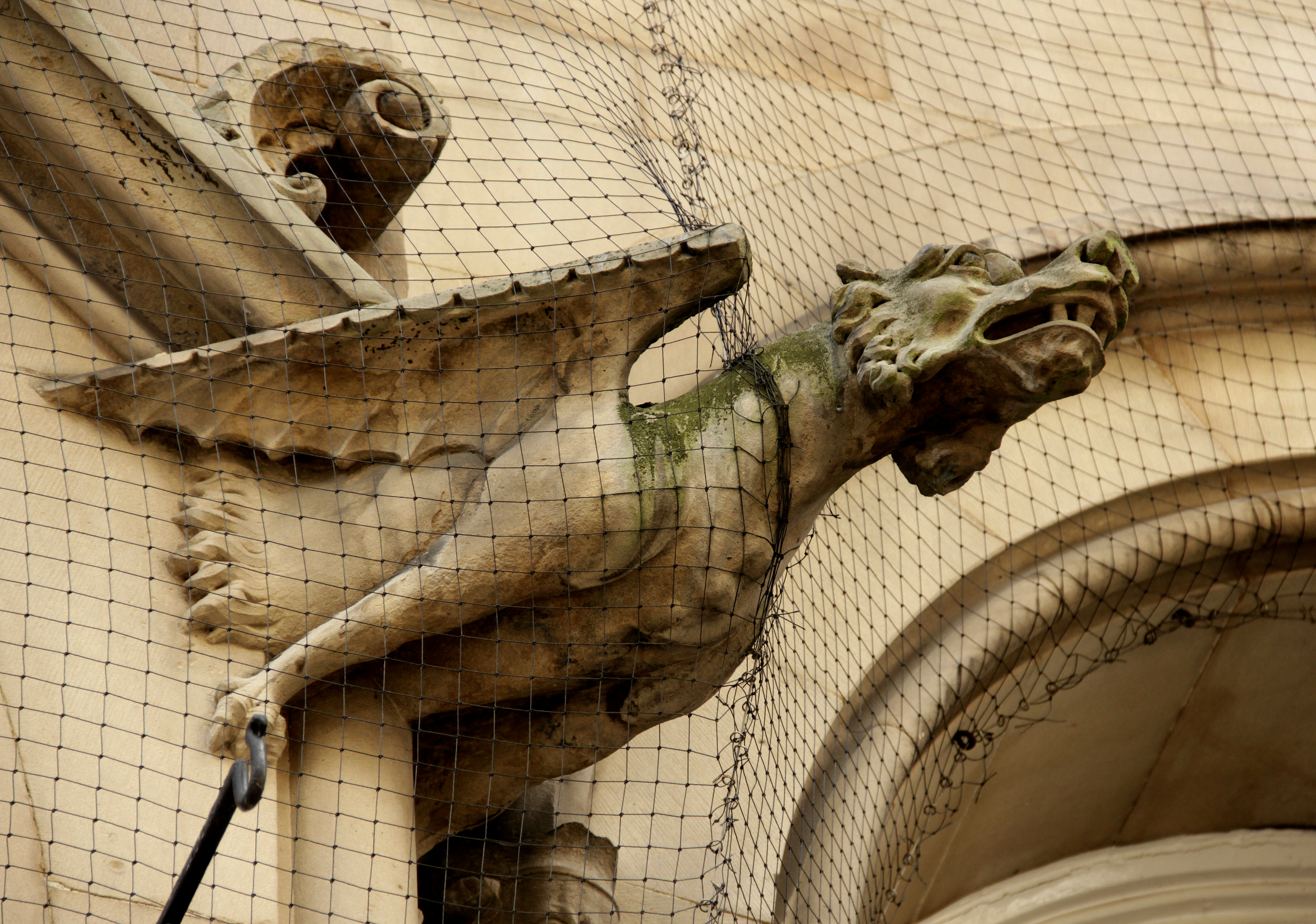
Imaginary sea wolf as gargoyle

This is a Grade II* listed building, at 7 Hustlergate, Bradford, West Yorkshire. It was designed in French Gothic style by architects Thomas Garlick Andrews (c.1837–1886) and Joseph Pepper of Bradford, for the Commercial Bank, and opened for business on 4 March 1868. The exterior is richly carved on a maritime theme, with waves in place of leaves on capitals and strings, and sea monsters as label stops. It is now occupied by the National Westminster Bank, but still has the emblem of the Commercial Bank over the door. In 1868, local newspapers reported:

"The arms of the borough, encircled by a ribbon bearing the name, "Bradford Commercial Bank," are richly carved in the arms above [the door] ... [It has windows] surmounted by gablets, having carved crockets and finials ... a richly carved cornice [and] carved capitals. At the level of the springing of the arches on each floor are carved bands, and the label moulds are terminated by grotesque animals of spirited design. Throughout the work the whole of the carving has been executed by Mawer & Ingle of Leeds. [The cornice is] supported on carved brackets in couples." (Yorkshire Post and Leeds Intelligencer; Bradford Observer, March 1868)

Media related to Former Commercial Bank, Bank Street, Bradford at Wikimedia Commons

=== Former Church of St Clement, Chapeltown Road, Leeds, 1867–1868 ===
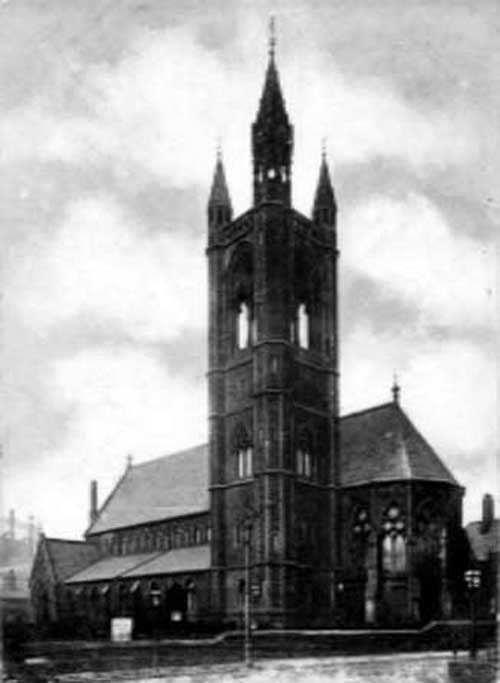
St Clements before 1914

The former St Clement's in Chapeltown Road, Leeds, was designed by George Corson in the "style of the decorated Gothic of the 14th century". The foundation stone was laid on Wednesday 24 April 1867, and the church was consecrated by the Bishop of Ripon on 10 September 1868. It was closed in 1974, listed in 1975 and demolished in 1976. The site is now part of Sheepscar Interchange.

In 1868 the Leeds Mercury described the interior:

"The arches are supported on cylindrical pillars of red sandstone, from the Dumfries quarries, with moulded bases, and with caps carved with natural foliage, conventionally arranged ... [On the arches] the stone hood mould is stopped over every pillar by a carved boss in the form of a bird with wings spreading up in the hollow of the mould - the eagle, dove, swan and peewit being the birds introduced on the south side, and the goatsucker, owl, night heron and bittern on the north ... The chancel is divided from the nave by a lofty arch of red brick and stone, carried on pillars of red stone, with corbels under them carved with natural foliage ... [The ribs of the chancel ceiling] are supported on red stone shafts corbelled out from wall, each corbel being carved as a shield surrounded by foliage and bearing the instruments of the Passion ... In the centre of the west end is the font; it is of Caen stone, the bowl square, carved in quatrefoils filled with leafage, the stem of red stone, with green marble pillars at the angles. The communion rail is of Caen stone, pierced and carved [and has] red stone pillars which terminate the rail. The pulpit, mainly of Caen stone, is circular in plan, carried on a central stem, and five pillars of red stone, with carved caps. In the body of it are carved strings round the base, and the top of conventional ornament, and the book-rest is bracketted forward and carved in similar style. The four panels are intended to be filled with figure subjects illustrating the following text which is carved round the pulpit: Go ye unto all the world and preach the gospel to every creature ... At the side of the pulpit is a pierced quatrefoil with shield bearing an anchor, the emblem of St Clement. Also of Caen stone, the reading desk has a rectangular stem with four red stone pillars at the angles, with carved caps; these support the desk, curving out in front and sides. The front is formed into a panel, with an eagle at the centre, and natural foliage spreading out on each side; the sides are similarly treated. Maple is the leaf used for the front, the passion flower used for one side, the fig for the other ... The contractors were ... Messrs Mawer & Ingle for carving, and for pulpit, reading desk, font, and communion rail."

Media related to Former St Clement's Church, Chapeltown Road, Leeds at Wikimedia Commons

=== St John the Evangelist, Lepton, 1866–1868 ===
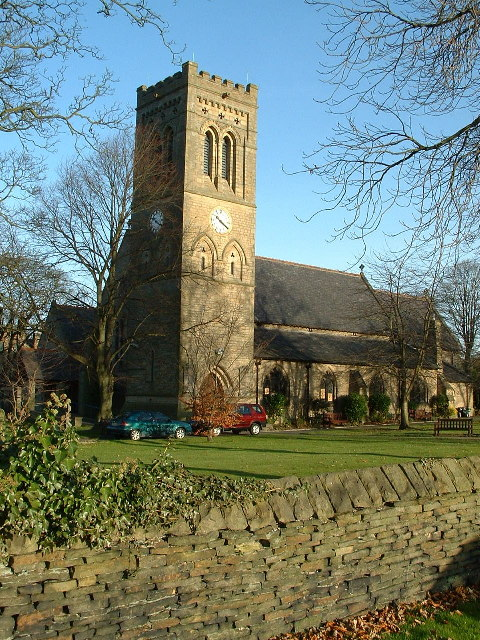
St John, Lepton

St John the Evangelist, on Green Balk Lane, Lepton, West Yorkshire, is a Grade II listed building "on the site of an ancient cross." It was built to benefit a local community of small farmers, hand loom weavers and coal miners. It was designed in early decorated Gothic style, with a tower on the south side, by Thomas Henry Healey (1839–1910) and his brother Francis Healey (1835–1910) of Bradford. The foundation stone was laid on 29 October 1866, and the church was consecrated on Saturday 28 November 1868.

In 1868, the Huddersfield Chronicle said: The walls are of local stone, but the mouldings were "wrought in hard sandstone from Crossland Moor ... The font, of hard Bolton Wood stone is placed near the entrance; it is of good character ... Messrs. Mawer & Ingle, Leeds, carving" (except the pulpit, which is by Rutter & Kett (sic) of Cambridge). On 10 November 1866 the Huddersfield Chronicle published a suggestion that "the ancient font, formerly in Kirkheaton Church ... [was now] in use as a pig trough in a farm in Kirkheaton ... the Lepton people should, if the font is in good preservation, endeavour to obtain it, have it restored, and place it in the new church at Lepton." However it is unlikely that the old font was re-used, since the Chronicle knew the quarry source of the stone used for the font present at the consecration.

The tower was added in 1876. The tower clock was added in 1930 as a war memorial, and the squat, square, slated spire was removed in 1976. A large extension was added in 1992, and the pews were removed.

Media related to St John's Church, Lepton at Wikimedia Commons

=== Former Unitarian Chapel, Chapel Lane, Bradford, 1869 ===
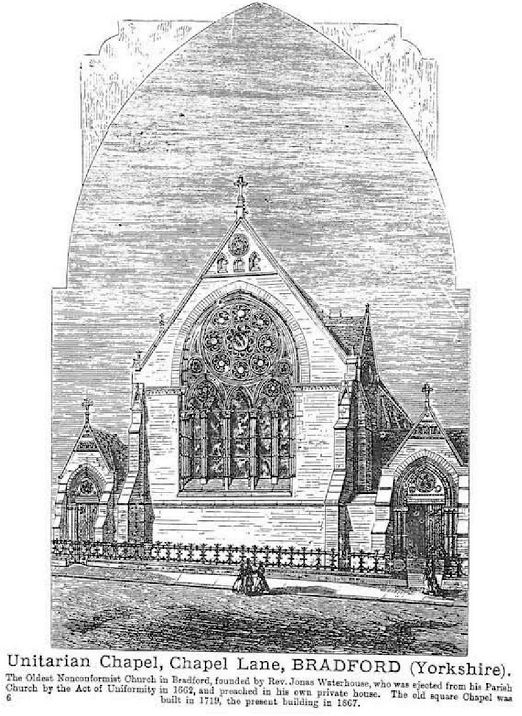
Unitarian Chapel, Chapel Lane, before 1900

The former Unitarian Chapel on Chapel Lane, Bradford, was designed by Andrews, Son & Pepper of Bradford, in the French Gothic style. The foundation stone was laid on Tuesday 25 February 1868, and the chapel was opened on 3 June 1869. It replaced an earlier chapel built in 1717 or 1718 on the same site. The old gateway from the entrance to the old chapel yard was to be removed to Peel Park, Bradford in 1867.

The Yorkshire Post and Leeds Intelligencer said in 1869: "The body of the chapel is divided into five bays by massive stone shafts, with carved capitals, supporting the main side walls ... The pulpit is of Caen stone, with carved panels containing discs of polished marble, and a cornice enriched by foliated ornaments ... The porches have large and deeply recessed doorways with shafts and mouldings elaborately carved ... The well-executed carving by Maw (sic) & Ingle of Leeds."

The building was demolished in 1969 and the site used for a "city centre development."

Media related to Former Unitarian Chapel, Chapel Lane Bradford at Wikimedia Commons

=== Scottish Widows insurance building, Park Row, Leeds, 1869 ===
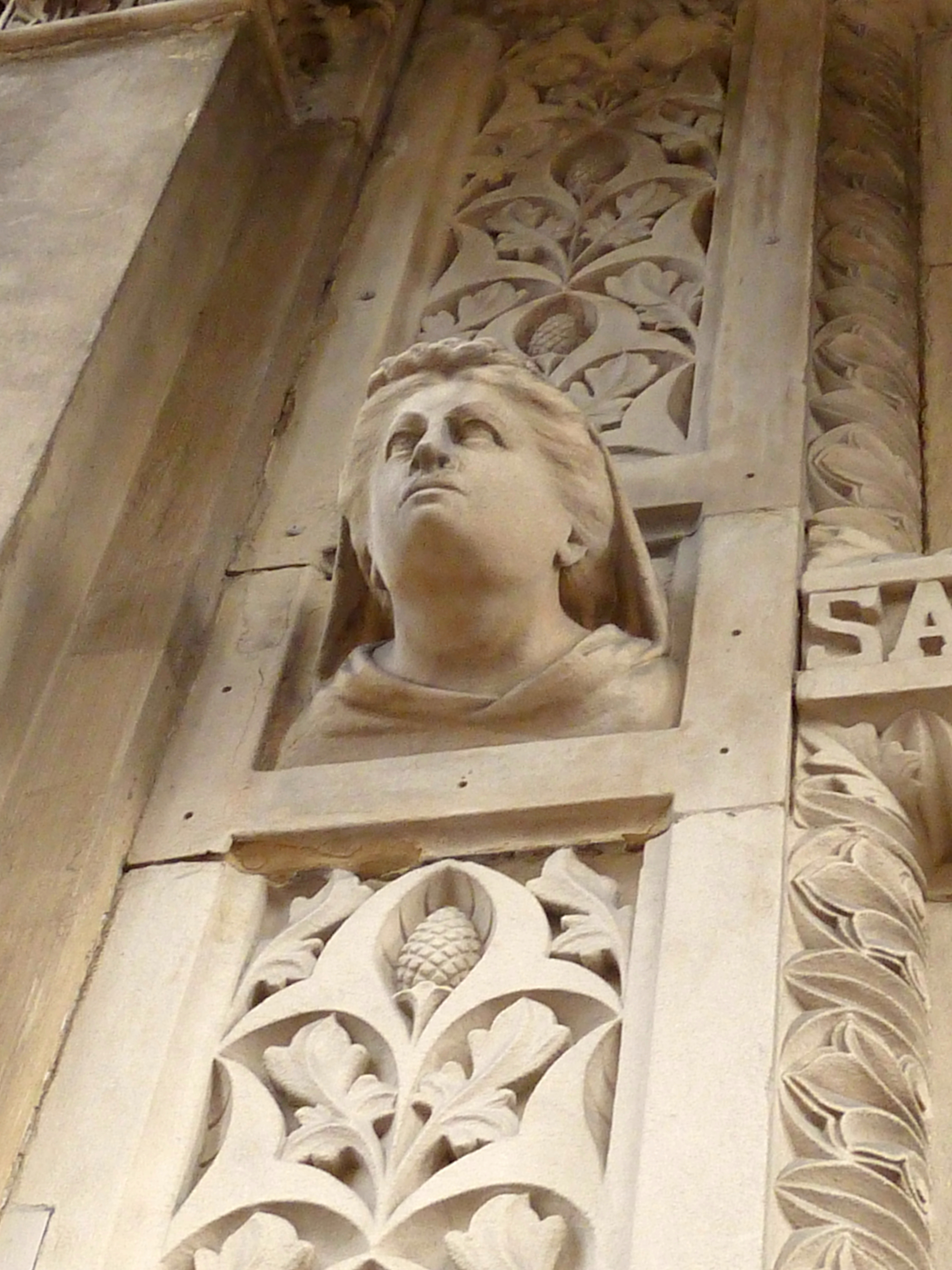
Head in doorway of Scottish Widows building

The Scottish Widows building on the east side of Park Row, Leeds, opposite the old Bank of England, now known as St Andrews Chambers, is a Grade II listed building. It was designed by George Corson in Italianate style, and the foundations were laid in 1869. It was planned with two porticos with paired red granite pillars. It was built as planned, but sometime after 1905 it lost one portico, and now has four ground floor windows instead of three. Historic England describes its "elaborately carved door surround." The windows each have a "carved tympanum on consoles and carved aprons to 1st floor." There is a "Guilloche frieze with projecting lions' heads, heavy modillion eaves cornice and balustraded parapet with urns."

In 1869, the Yorkshire Post and Leeds Intelligencer said of the architect's drawings: "The elevation is in the Italian style ... entirely of stone ... There are two entrances, one at each end of the front, exactly alike ... The entrances are open porticoes, with two coupled Corinthian columns, and pilasters corresponding on each side of the doorway ... The first floor has a range of five windows ... with carving in the tympanae ... The building is crowned with a massive cornice, richly carved ... Messrs. Mawer and Ingle, Leeds, are the masons employed."

Media related to Scottish Widows building Park Row Leeds at Wikimedia Commons

=== United Free Methodists day and infant schools, Farsley, 1869 ===
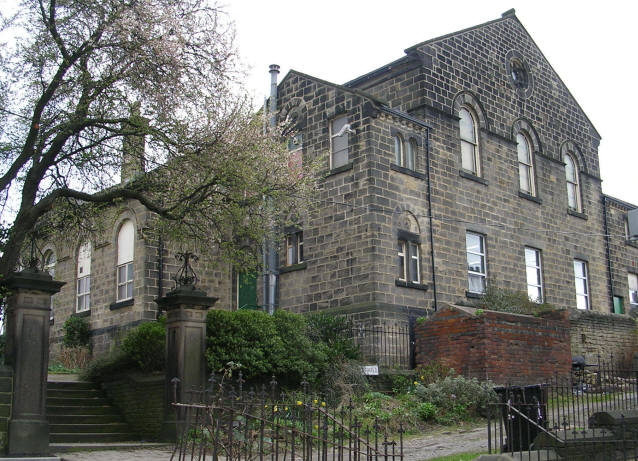
United Free Methodist schools

The structure built for the United Free Methodists day and infant schools, Back Lane, Farsley, in 1869, is unlisted. It was designed by CS and AJ Nelson of Park Row, Leeds. The foundation stone was laid on Saturday 5 December 1868, and the opening services commenced on Thursday 1 July 1869. It was built for 700 scholars by the United Methodist Free Church, adjoining the 1846 Wesleyan Chapel which had already been converted into a school room. The ground plan is a double T, that is, it has two wings.

In 1869 the Bradford Observer reported:

"Over each door the spandril has been filled in with carved fern leaves with the monogram in the centre, the one containing the Year of Our Lord, and the other the letters UFM representing the United Free Methodists, the denomination who have erected the schools. In addition to these carved spandrils, the heads of the gable and staircase windows have been filled with carved circular patere ... The carving has been executed by Messrs. Mawer & Ingle, of Leeds.".

Farsley Community Church now inhabits the building. It has been completely refurbished inside, with a new entrance.

Media related to Farsley Community Church at Wikimedia Commons

=== Christ Church, Windhill, Shipley, 1868–1869 ===
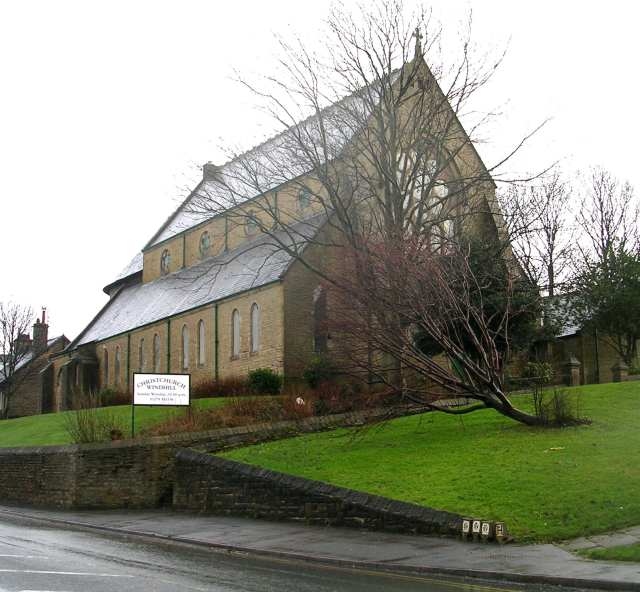
Christ Church in 2007, showing some rebuilding, and no spire

Christ Church is an unlisted building on Church Street, Windhill, Shipley West Yorkshire. It was designed in "Gothic style" for 620 sittings, and with an apse, by Thomas Garlick Andrews (c.1837–1886) and Joseph Pepper of Bradford. The ground was broken in spring 1868, and the cornerstone was laid on the left of the entrance porch by the Bishop of Ripon on Saturday 17 October of the same year, when the church was already half-built. It was consecrated by the same bishop on Monday 16 August 1869. The procession following the bishop to the foundation ceremony included the workmen, contractors and architects besides the usual VIPs and clergy. Mawer & Ingle executed "a pulpit and font of white stone, ornate in style," and general carving.

At the foundation ceremony, the Yorkshire Post and Leeds Intelligencer said that the tower and spire would be built later, and that the building was "divided into a nave and side aisles by circular stone shafts, having carved capitals supporting pointed arches in stone ... A porch vestibule, equal in extent to the width of the nave, is placed at the west end, with a deeply recessed entrance, having shafts with carved capitals and bold arch mouldings."

The church has no spire now, and no evidence has been found that the tower and spire were ever built.

Media related to Christ Church, Windhill, Shipley at Wikimedia Commons

=== Former Church of St Silas, Hunslet, 1868–1869 ===
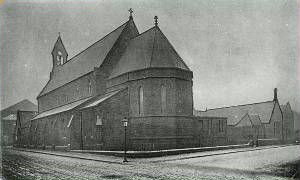
St Silas before 1914

The former Church of St Silas, on Goodman Street, Hunslet, Leeds, was designed by George Corson for 700–750 sittings in "Gothic style". The foundation stone was laid on 2 July 1868, and the church was consecrated on Thursday 25 November 1869. St Silas was unlisted, and closed in 1952. Demolition plans were announced in 1954, and the building was demolished in 1954 or 1956.

The church had "a nave, north and south aisles, and chancel with apsoidal end; an organ chamber on one side, and a vestry on the other." There was "a porch on the north and south sides; no tower, but in its place a belfry at the west end." In keeping with available funds, only the nave and one aisle were built initially.

In 1869, the Yorkshire Post and Leeds Intelligencer reported:

"The chancel is finished as an apse of five sides, with a single light lancet window in each, and stone shafts in the angles, with bases corbelled out from the wall, bands and carved caps supporting the ribs of the roof. These ribs form pointed arches spanning the chancel, and meeting in a carved boss at the centre of the apse ... [The pillars of the chancel arch] are carved with natural foliage, the fern being used on one side and the maple on the other. The corbels are formed as shields, bordered with foliage; the emblems of the Fall are carved on the shield on the north side; the emblems of the Redemption on the shield to the south ... The font is of Caen stone, the bowl being octagon on a circular shaft, and carved with heads of the Evangelists, and their emblems on alternate sides of the octagon ... Messrs Mawer & Ingle, carving and font." (Yorkshire Post and Leeds Intelligencer 26 November 1869)

Media related to St Silas Hunslet at Wikimedia Commons

=== Church of St John the Evangelist, Dewsbury, 1869 ===
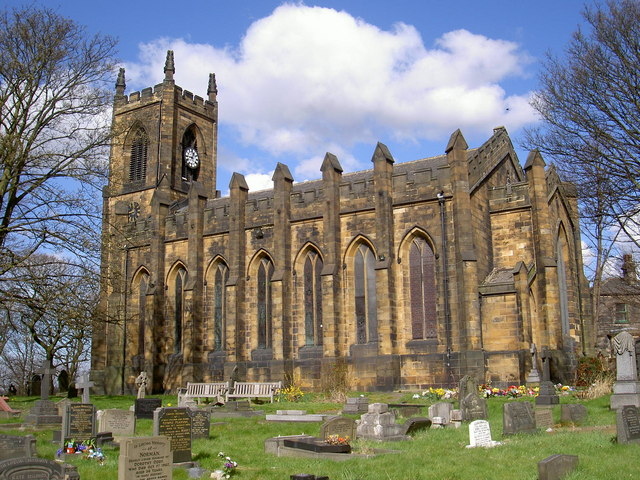
St John Dewsbury

St John the Evangelist, Boothroyd Lane, Dewsbury is a Grade II listed building. It was designed by Thomas Taylor, and built 1823–1827.

Around Sunday 5 December 1869 the church was reopened after refurbishment. The church was re-seated and redecorated, including stencilling and calligraphy on the walls and painting the chancel ceiling in blue with gold stars. "The pulpit is of early English, Caen stone, with twelve fossil marble shafts, designed by the architects, and wrought by Messrs. Mawer & Ingle, of Leeds. The font, by the same firm, also of Caen stone, and four marble shafts ... architects Cory & Ferguson." Three windows were presented, including one by William Wailes. Mintons tiles were supplied for the chancel, and a clock and organ ordered.

Between 2011 and 2017, the pulpit was repositioned and made into a sound desk, as part of a reordering programme.

Media related to St John the Evangelist, Dewsbury Moor at Wikimedia Commons

=== Former Church of All Saints, Woodlesford, 1869-1870 ===
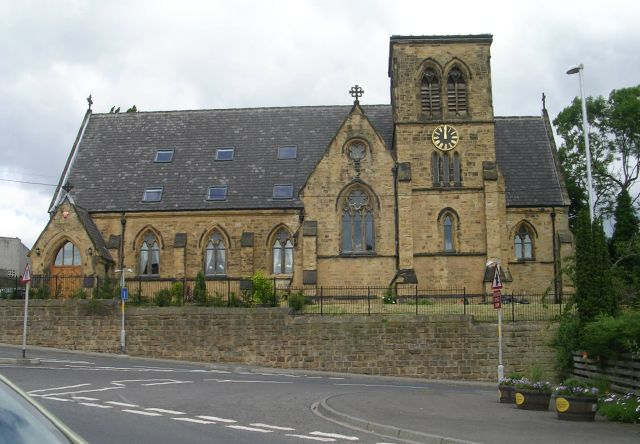
Former All Saints Woodlesford

The Former All Saints Church, Station Lane, Woodlesford, West Yorkshire, has been a Grade II listed building since 1988. It was designed by William Perkin & Sons in imitation of the geometric period of Gothic architecture. The foundation stone was laid on Thursday 1 April 1869, when the builders and architects processed along with the clergy and VIPs. The church was consecrated on Wednesday 6 December 1870.

Funds were raised by subscription, and the foundation stone was laid on 1 April 1869. The Yorkshire Post and Leeds Intelligencer said in 1869: "The pulpit and font are of Caen stone with red Devonshire and green serpentine marble shafts, with moulded bases and carved capitals. The chancel, transepts and tower arches are supported on carved, Caen stone capitals and red Devonshire marble shafts. The roof timbers in the chancel are supported on red Devonshire marble shafts and carved Caen stone capitals ... Mawer & Ingle, Leeds, carvers' work." William Ingle died in 1870, so after the consecration, the Leeds Mercury said that "the pulpit, font and general carving were executed by Charles Mawer of Leeds, from the drawings of the architects," whereas at the laying of the foundation stone in 1869 they had credited Mawer & Ingle.

The church closed in 1995 and has been converted into a house, completed in 2004. The pulpit still existed as of 2012 but had been removed to the boiler room. The structure lost its 115-foot spire between 1988 and 2008.

Media related to Church of All Saints, Woodlesford at Wikimedia Commons

=== Trent Bridge, 1868-1871 ===
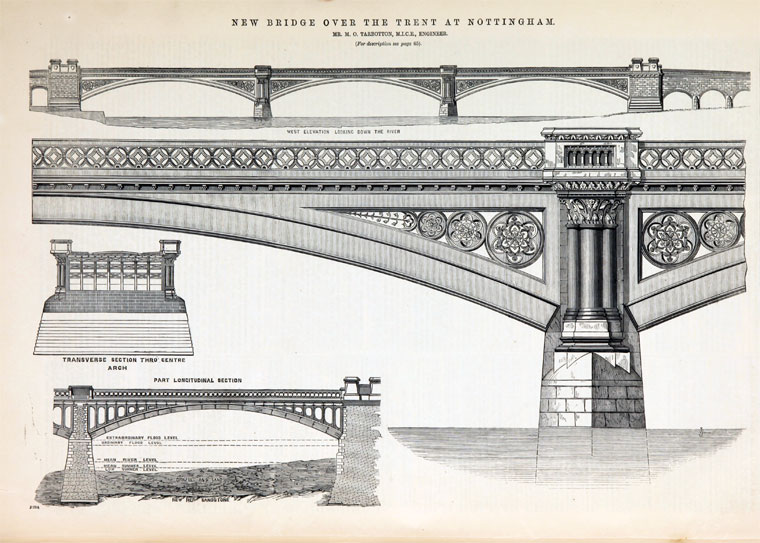
Tarbotton's 1869 drawings, indicating sculpture

Trent Bridge, on London Road, Nottingham, is a 700 feet (210 m) Grade II listed structure which cost approximately £31,000 (equivalent to £3,160,000 in 2025) to build in 1871. The engineer was Marriott Ogle Tarbotton M.Inst.CE, the borough surveyor and engineer of Nottingham Corporation, who had connections with Northallerton and Leeds, not far from the birthplaces of the Mawer family, in early life. The ground was broken in September 1868; foundations, cofferdams and abutments were under construction by February 1869 in spite of heavy floods; and the bridge was opened on Tuesday 25 July 1871 by the Mayor of Nottingham, John Manning. It was understood from the beginning that the "capitals of the clustered columns [would] be carved elaborately."

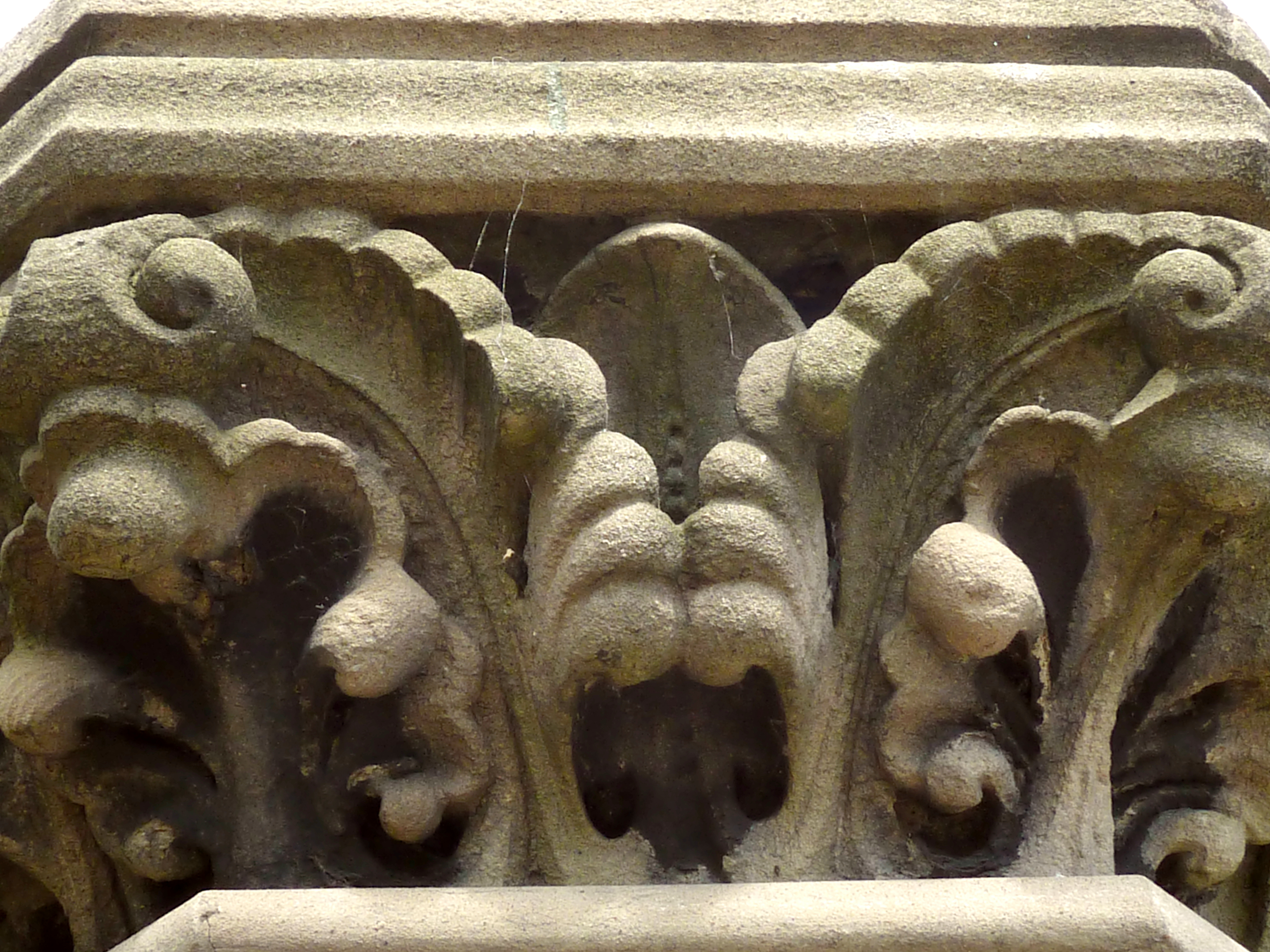
Stone carving, on water and leaves theme

In 1871, the Bedfordshire Mercury said that the ornamentation was in "Darley Dale, Mansfield stone, and Aberdeen granite ... the general effect is one of great elegance." The eight coats of arms were supplied by Thomas Close and sculptured by W.P. Smith of Nottingham, and Mawer & Ingle were credited for the "general carving."

The Nottinghamshire Guardian of the same year gave Tarbotton's own fully detailed account of the ancient history of the old bridge, and the engineering of the new one. Here he details his arrangements for the carved stone sections:

"The general stonework of the bridge, and of which all the ordinary faces are formed, is of the quarries of Mr. Sims, Whatstandwell, Derbyshire; the ashlar is clean boasted, and the front walling blocks are rock-faced, some fronts being carefully dressed with the chisel, to suit the architectural composition. The ornamental parts of the stonework, the cornices, caps, pedestals, recesses and other superior features are of Darley Dale stone, from the quarries of Sir Joseph Whitworth, and of red Mansfield and Mansfield Woodhouse stone, from the quarries of Mr. R. Lindley. All this stonework is cleansed and either moulded or carved. The south approach parapets are also of Darley Dale stone, rock-faced. The south flood arches have moulded stone arch quoins, the arches being of brickwork, each arch is on the skew, and the angles of each vary in consequence of the approach being on a curve, the radius of which is about 300 feet. The river piers are terminated at all the ends with clustered columns of polished Aberdeen granite, these support large carved caps, upon which are placed blocks of red Mansfield stone, the latter forming on the inside next the footpath seat recesses for the accommodation of foot passengers crossing the bridge. Cornices over these of richly carved Darley Dale stone complete the upper finish of the piers; the recess blocks on the external faces are deeply sunk in the solid stone, and have on all the fronts arcaded ornamentations, with polished serpentine granite shafts from Cornwall ... Messrs. Mawer & Ingle, of Leeds, for the general carving."

Media related to Trent Bridge, Nottingham at Wikimedia Commons

=== Former Congregational Church, Lightcliffe, 1870-1871 ===
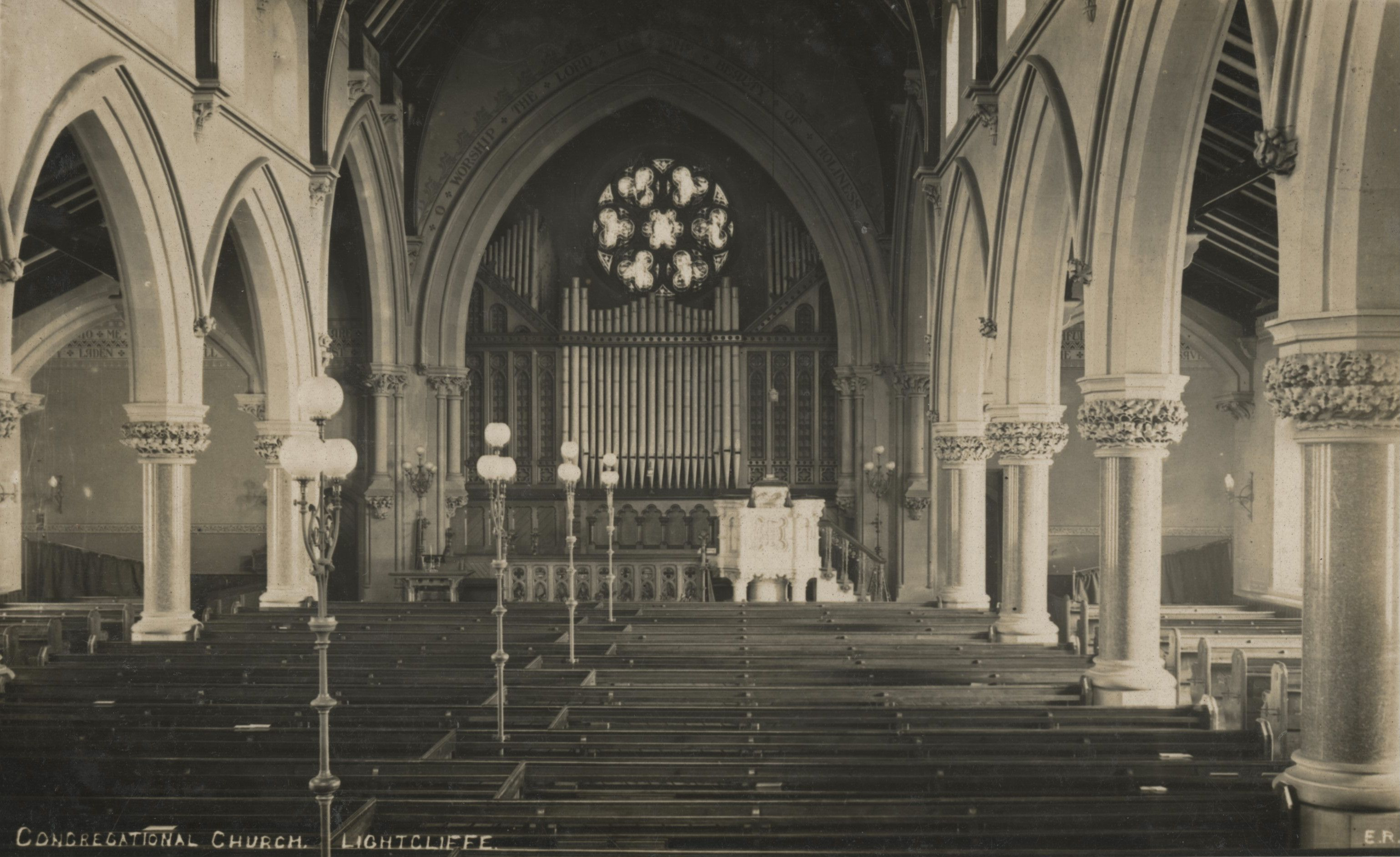
Congregational Church before 1914

The former Congregational Church on Leeds Road, Lightcliffe, near Halifax, West Yorkshire, is a Gothic Revival Grade II listed building. It was designed by Lockwood & Mawson in the geometric, decorated style. The foundation stone was laid on 22 August 1870, and it was opened on 18 October 1871. Mawer & Ingle executed the pulpit and general carving, and the pulpit was paid for by Titus Salt, who funded most of the building. In 1870, the Leeds Mercury noted that "The transept and organ chamber arches" would be "supported on carved and moulded stone corbels." At the opening in 1871 the same newspaper reported:

"The aisles are separated from the nave by four bays, which are supported on pillars of polished Shap granite with carved capitals, the carving being in imitation of hawthorn, ivy and maple leaves ... The pulpit is of Caen stone, and has been exquisitely carved by Messrs Maw (sic) & Ingle, of Leeds, who also executed the carving throughout the building."

The church was closed about 1978. It became the Stonecraft Centre in 1988. It was inhabited by Stone Court Contracts Ltd, who renamed the building "The Spire," until 2003. As of 2017 the building contains offices.

Media related to Former Lightcliffe Congregational Church, Hipperholme at Wikimedia Commons

== See also ==
- Robert Mawer
- Catherine Mawer
- Charles Mawer
- Benjamin Payler
- Matthew Taylor (sculptor)
- Benjamin Burstall
- William Ingle
