= Listed buildings in England =

England within the United Kingdom

This is an as yet incomplete list of listed buildings in England, which are the majority of the listed buildings of the United Kingdom.

The organisation of the lists in this series is on the same basis as the statutory register. County names are those used in the register, broadly based on the ceremonial counties and not always matching the current administrative areas.

== Grade I listed buildings in England ==
At the start of 2024 there were approximately 379,444 listed buildings in England and 2.5% of these are categorised as Grade I.

Grade I listed buildings by county
County	Number of sites
Grade I listed buildings in Bedfordshire	114
Grade I listed buildings in Berkshire	85
Grade I listed buildings in Bristol	53
Grade I listed buildings in Buckinghamshire	166
Grade I listed buildings in Cambridgeshire	304
Grade I listed buildings in Cheshire	142
Grade I listed buildings in Cornwall	224 (Note: The Royal Albert Bridge spanning River Tamar between the counties of Cornwall and Devon is counted in both Cornwall and Devon.)
Grade I listed buildings in Cumbria	186
Grade I listed buildings in Derbyshire	148
Grade I listed buildings in Devon	427
Grade I listed buildings in Dorset	264
Grade I listed buildings in Durham	121
Grade I listed buildings in the East Riding of Yorkshire	109
Grade I listed buildings in East Sussex	150
Grade I listed buildings in Essex	287
Grade I listed buildings in Gloucestershire	308 (Note: Including the Old Wye Bridge that spans the River Wye between the counties of Gloucestershire and Monmouthshire in Wales.)
Grade I listed buildings in London	589
Grade I listed buildings in Greater Manchester	49
Grade I listed buildings in Hampshire	215
Grade I listed buildings in Herefordshire	127
Grade I listed buildings in Hertfordshire	108
Grade I listed buildings in Isle of Wight	29
Grade I listed buildings in Kent	435
Grade I listed buildings in Lancashire	73
Grade I listed buildings in Leicestershire	93
Grade I listed buildings in Lincolnshire	440
Grade I listed buildings in Merseyside	38
Grade I listed buildings in Norfolk	540
Grade I listed buildings in North Yorkshire	364
Grade I listed buildings in Northamptonshire	195
Grade I listed buildings in Northumberland	174
Grade I listed buildings in Nottinghamshire	147
Grade I listed buildings in Oxfordshire	381
Grade I listed buildings in Rutland	28
Grade I listed buildings in Shropshire	131
Grade I listed buildings in Somerset	478
Grade I listed buildings in South Yorkshire	62
Grade I listed buildings in Staffordshire	78
Grade I listed buildings in Suffolk	406
Grade I listed buildings in Surrey	105
Grade I listed buildings in Tyne and Wear	77
Grade I listed buildings in Warwickshire	112
Grade I listed buildings in the West Midlands	63
Grade I listed buildings in West Sussex	176
Grade I listed buildings in West Yorkshire	119
Grade I listed buildings in Wiltshire	295
Grade I listed buildings in Worcestershire	107
Total	9,322

See also

- Grade I listed buildings in Bath and North East Somerset
- Grade I listed buildings in Brighton and Hove
- Grade I listed buildings in City of Bradford
- Grade I listed buildings in Mendip
- Grade I listed buildings in North Somerset
- Grade I listed buildings in Liverpool
- Grade I listed buildings in Sedgemoor
- Grade I listed buildings in South Somerset
- Grade I listed buildings in Taunton Deane
- Grade I listed buildings in West Somerset
- Grade I listed buildings in England completed in the 20th century

== Grade II* listed buildings in England ==
At the start of 2024 there were approximately 379,444 listed buildings entries in England and 5.8% of these are categorized as Grade II*.

Grade II* listed buildings by county
County	Number of sites
Grade II* listed buildings in Bedfordshire	141
Grade II* listed buildings in Berkshire	252
Grade II* listed buildings in Bristol	212
Grade II* listed buildings in Buckinghamshire	357
Grade II* listed buildings in Cambridgeshire	488
Grade II* listed buildings in Cheshire	390
Grade II* listed buildings in Cornwall	586
Grade II* listed buildings in Cumbria	460
Grade II* listed buildings in Derbyshire	368
Grade II* listed buildings in Devon	1,237
Grade II* listed buildings in Dorset	508
Grade II* listed buildings in Durham	238
Grade II* listed buildings in the East Riding of Yorkshire	184
Grade II* listed buildings in East Sussex	347
Grade II* listed buildings in Essex	771
Grade II* listed buildings in Gloucestershire	820
Grade II* listed buildings in London	1,387
Grade II* listed buildings in Greater Manchester	242
Grade II* listed buildings in Hampshire	549
Grade II* listed buildings in Herefordshire	356
Grade II* listed buildings in Hertfordshire	472
Grade II* listed buildings in Isle of Wight	67
Grade II* listed buildings in Kent	971
Grade II* listed buildings in Lancashire	274
Grade II* listed buildings in Leicestershire	333
Grade II* listed buildings in Lincolnshire	583
Grade II* listed buildings in Merseyside	173
Grade II* listed buildings in Norfolk	839
Grade II* listed buildings in North Yorkshire	743
Grade II* listed buildings in Northamptonshire	368
Grade II* listed buildings in Northumberland	267
Grade II* listed buildings in Nottinghamshire	200
Grade II* listed buildings in Oxfordshire	694
Grade II* listed buildings in Rutland	71
Grade II* listed buildings in Shropshire	536
Grade II* listed buildings in Somerset	1,073
Grade II* listed buildings in South Yorkshire	165
Grade II* listed buildings in Staffordshire	361
Grade II* listed buildings in Suffolk	800
Grade II* listed buildings in Surrey	358
Grade II* listed buildings in Tyne and Wear	208
Grade II* listed buildings in Warwickshire	355
Grade II* listed buildings in the West Midlands	224
Grade II* listed buildings in West Sussex	299
Grade II* listed buildings in West Yorkshire	412
Grade II* listed buildings in Wiltshire	727
Grade II* listed buildings in Worcestershire	322
Total	21,788

See also

- Grade II* listed buildings in Brighton and Hove
- Grade II* listed buildings in Liverpool city centre
- Grade II* listed buildings in Liverpool suburbs

== Listed buildings in England by county or locality ==
Listed buildings by county
County	Number of sites
Listed buildings in Bedfordshire	
Listed buildings in Berkshire	
Listed buildings in Bristol	
Listed buildings in Buckinghamshire	
Listed buildings in Cambridgeshire	
Listed buildings in Cheshire	
Listed buildings in Cornwall	
Listed buildings in Cumbria	
Listed buildings in Derbyshire	
Listed buildings in Devon	
Listed buildings in Dorset	
Listed buildings in Durham	
Listed buildings in the East Riding of Yorkshire	
Listed buildings in East Sussex	
Listed buildings in Essex	
Listed buildings in Gloucestershire	
Listed buildings in Greater London	
Listed buildings in Greater Manchester	
Listed buildings in Hampshire	
Listed buildings in Herefordshire	
Listed buildings in Hertfordshire	
Listed buildings in Isle of Wight	
Listed buildings in Kent	
Listed buildings in Lancashire	
Listed buildings in Leicestershire	
Listed buildings in Lincolnshire	
Listed buildings in Merseyside	
Listed buildings in Norfolk	
Listed buildings in North Yorkshire	
Listed buildings in Northamptonshire	
Listed buildings in Northumberland	
Listed buildings in Nottinghamshire	
Listed buildings in Oxfordshire	
Listed buildings in Rutland	
Listed buildings in Shropshire	
Listed buildings in Somerset	
Listed buildings in South Yorkshire	
Listed buildings in Staffordshire	
Listed buildings in Suffolk	
Listed buildings in Surrey	
Listed buildings in Tyne and Wear	
Listed buildings in Warwickshire	
Listed buildings in the West Midlands	
Listed buildings in West Sussex	
Listed buildings in West Yorkshire	
Listed buildings in Wiltshire	
Listed buildings in Worcestershire	
Total	

== Lists of listed buildings by function ==
- Signal boxes that are listed buildings in England
- List of listed London Underground stations

Grade I listed churches by location

- Cheshire
- Cumbria
- Derbyshire
- East Riding of Yorkshire
- Greater Manchester
- Lancashire
- Merseyside
- Shropshire
- Staffordshire
- West Yorkshire

== See also ==
- List of castles in England
- List of abbeys and priories in England
- List of country houses in the United Kingdom#England
- List of English Renaissance theatres
- Listed buildings in Scotland
- Listed buildings in Wales
- Listed buildings in Northern Ireland
