= Listed buildings in Dorset =

Listed buildings in Dorset are of special interest and are divided into three grades:

- Grade I listed buildings in Dorset, of exceptional interest
- Grade II* listed buildings in Dorset, more than special interest
- Grade II listed buildings in Dorset, special interest
