= Matthew Taylor (sculptor) =

British sculptor (1837–1889)

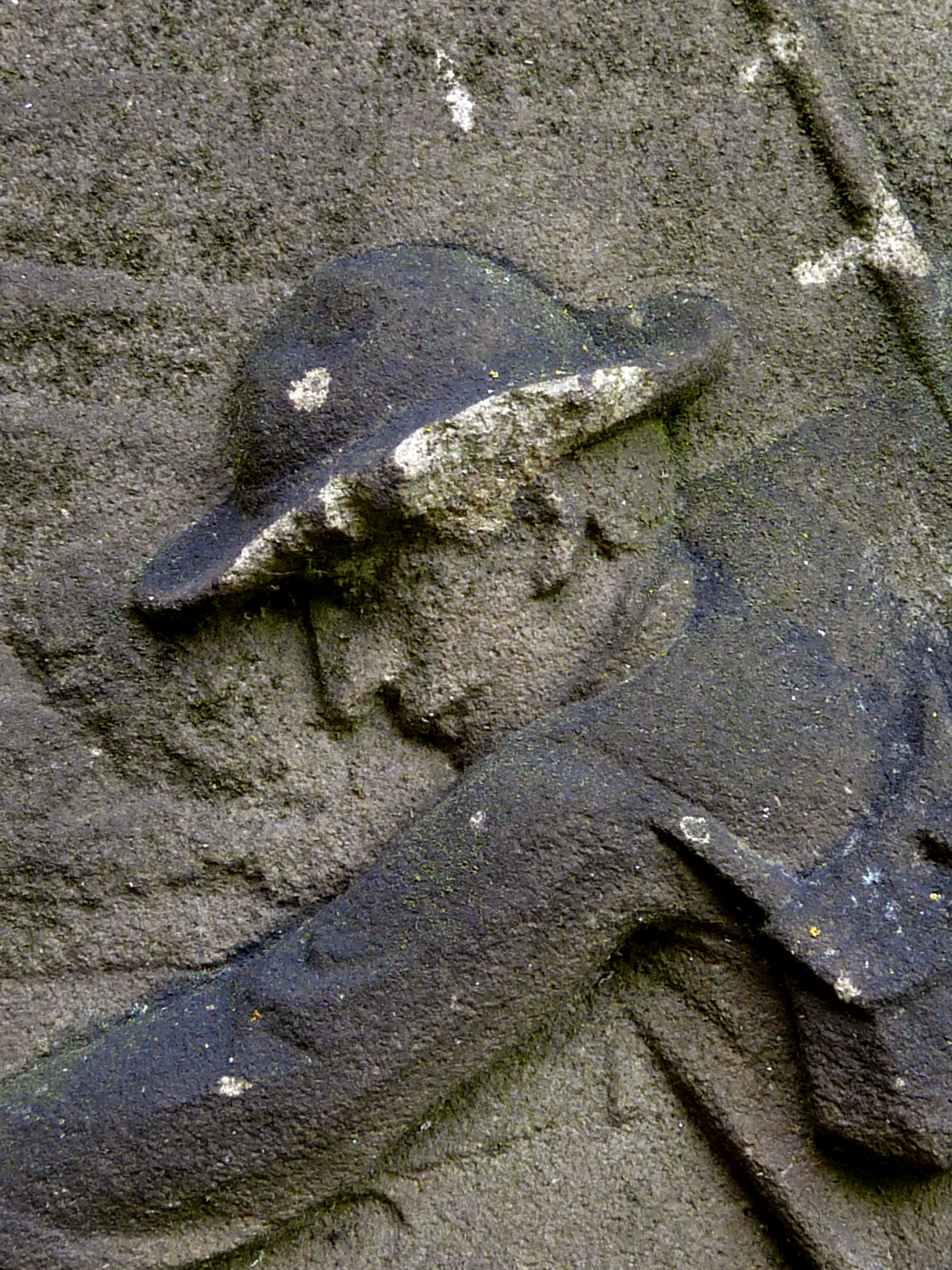
- Self-portrait of Taylor as a youth on the Angler's Tomb, Woodhouse Cemetery
- Born: 2 February 1837; Leeds
- Died: 9 July 1889 (aged 52); St Peter's Cottage, Arthington
- Resting place: Arthington churchyard
- Notable work: Angler's Tomb, 1873; Statues, Leeds Sch. Board, 1881
- Style: Aesthetic movement Romanticism; Neoclassicism
- Spouse: Elizabeth Keith (1842–1934)
- Memorials: Sculpted gravestone in Arthington churchyard

Matthew Taylor (Leeds 2 February 1837– Arthington 9 July 1889) (fl. 1861–1889) was a sculptor based in Leeds and Arthington, West Yorkshire, England. He was apprenticed to Catherine Mawer, and was known in his day for bust, medallion and relief portraits, and statues. He exhibited some of these in Leeds Art Gallery during the last decade of his life. Between 1861 and 1876 he worked in partnership with Benjamin Burstall (1835–1876); they executed the sculpture on the Town Hall at Bolton in Greater Manchester. After Taylor's death, in 1905 his work received further recognition when Reverend W.T. Adey praised his carving on William Taylor's gravestone at Woodhouse Cemetery, Leeds, and named it the "Angler's Tomb." That work is now a listed monument. Taylor was a member of the Mawer Group, which included the above-mentioned sculptors, plus Robert Mawer, Charles Mawer, Benjamin Payler and William Ingle.

== Early life ==
Matthew Taylor (Leeds 2 February 1837– Arthington 9 July 1889; fl. 1861–1889). His paternal grandfather was Matthew Taylor, a farmer, who married Elizabeth. His father was William Taylor (Grewelthorpe c.1793 – Leeds 24 May 1873); a joiner and carpenter who moved to Leeds as a young man and married there; he is buried at St George's Fields, Leeds. His mother was Hannah Fisher (Gildersome 1800 – Leeds 12 August 1883). Matthew was born in East Street, Leeds, and baptised at St Peter's, Leeds Parish Church, on 26 February 1837. The 1841 Census finds him, the fourth of five siblings, living with his parents at Queen's Place, Leeds. In 1851 the family was living at Back Claremont Place, Leeds; three children remain at home, and Matthew was still a scholar at age 14. In 1861 the family was living at 12 Tolson Street, Leeds, and Matthew was still with his parents and two siblings; he was now a sculptor at age 24.

== Apprenticeship ==
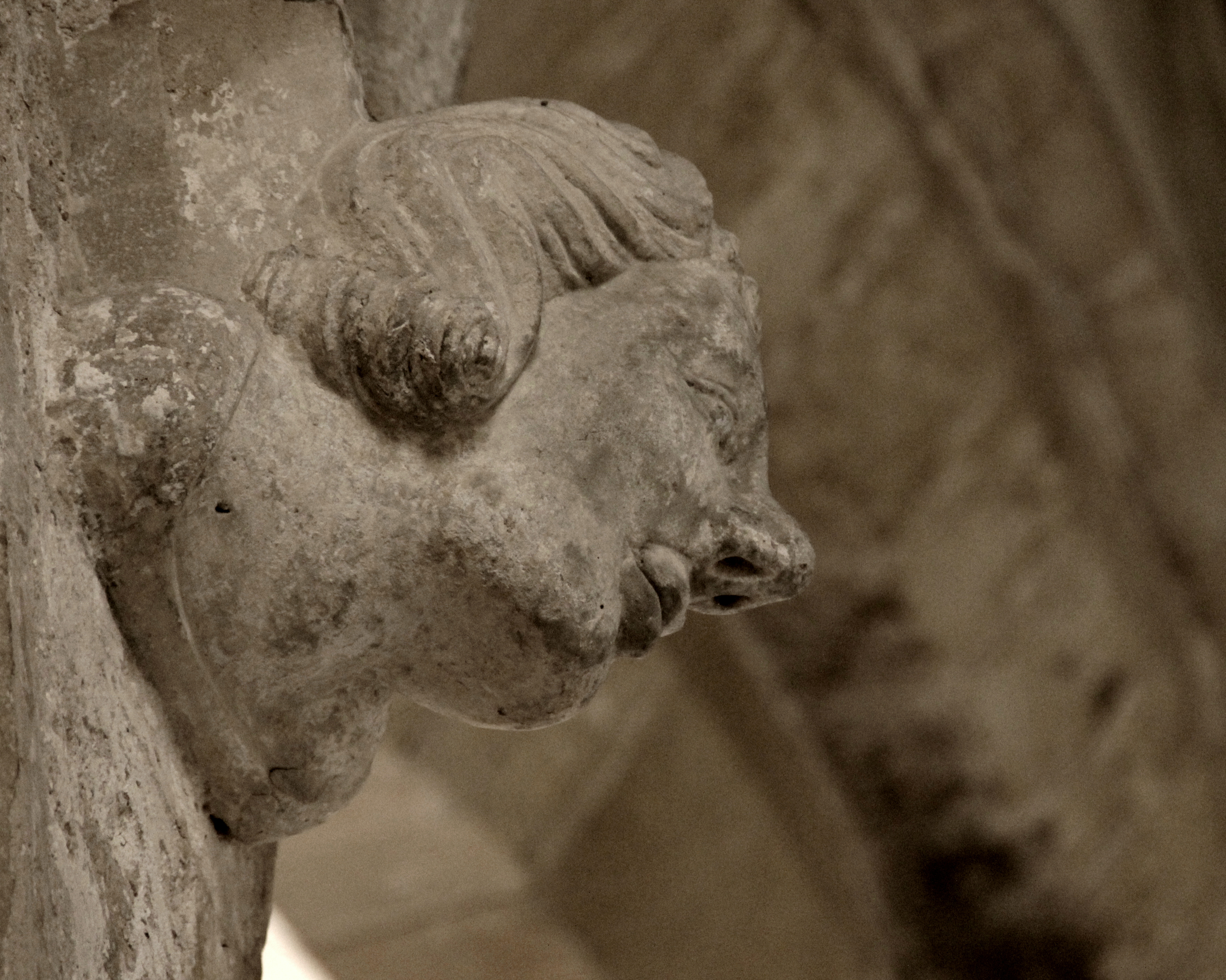
Faux Romanesque caricature of Taylor (1859) by Catherine Mawer

He was apprenticed to Catherine Mawer from about 1851, alongside Benjamin Paylor. In 1856 Catherine summonsed him to Court for disobeying orders, but her case was dismissed. During this hearing, when he was nineteen years old, the Leeds Intelligencer described him as "exceedingly clever at his business." Assuming that he completed his apprenticeship at age 21, he could have been a top sculptor from 1858. It is not known whether he continued employment with Catherine Mawer during the next three years. From 1861 he ran his own business, carving busts and medallion portraits. and creating monumental sculpture. He was also possibly a monumental and architectural sculptor. On 27 September 1866 he married Elizabeth Keith (Bolton 1842 – North Leeds 3 November 1934), the daughter of a paper maker. Benjamin Burstall was a witness to the marriage. In the 1871 Census Matthew was living at 6 Hillary Street, Leeds, with his wife and his child Frances aged 2 years. Matthew and Elizabeth had five children, of whom the eldest was artist-sculptor Francis Bertram (1868–1950). The others were George (1873 – South Africa 16 January 1896) a clerk-solicitor, Sydney (b.1876), Lucy (1879 – Arthington 18 June 1906) and Ellen (b.1883).

== Career ==
From around 1861 to 1876, he worked in partnership, as Burstall and Taylor, Sculptors, with Benjamin Burstall (1835–1876). Their function has been described as "marble masons and statuaries, sculptors." The partnership was based in Cookridge Street, Leeds, and ended when Burstall died of tuberculosis.

Taylor was the "gifted sculptor" of the 1870s angler's tomb in Woodhouse Cemetery. In July 1880 he exhibited "excellent works" at The Yorkshire Art Exhibition. Between 1871 and 1876 he was at 6 Hillary Street, Leeds, describing himself as a sculptor. In 1881 he was trading at 52 Cookridge Street, Leeds, describing himself as sculptor and stone carver. Between 1881 and 1889 he was living at St Peter's Cottage, Arthington, in Wharfedale, where he died. On 3 October 1888, at the opening of Leeds City Art Gallery, one of his sculptures was in the central museum court. In 1889 he exhibited multiple works at the Spring Exhibition at Leeds City Art Gallery.

== Death ==
He left £2,437 14s 5d at his death. He is buried in Arthington churchyard.

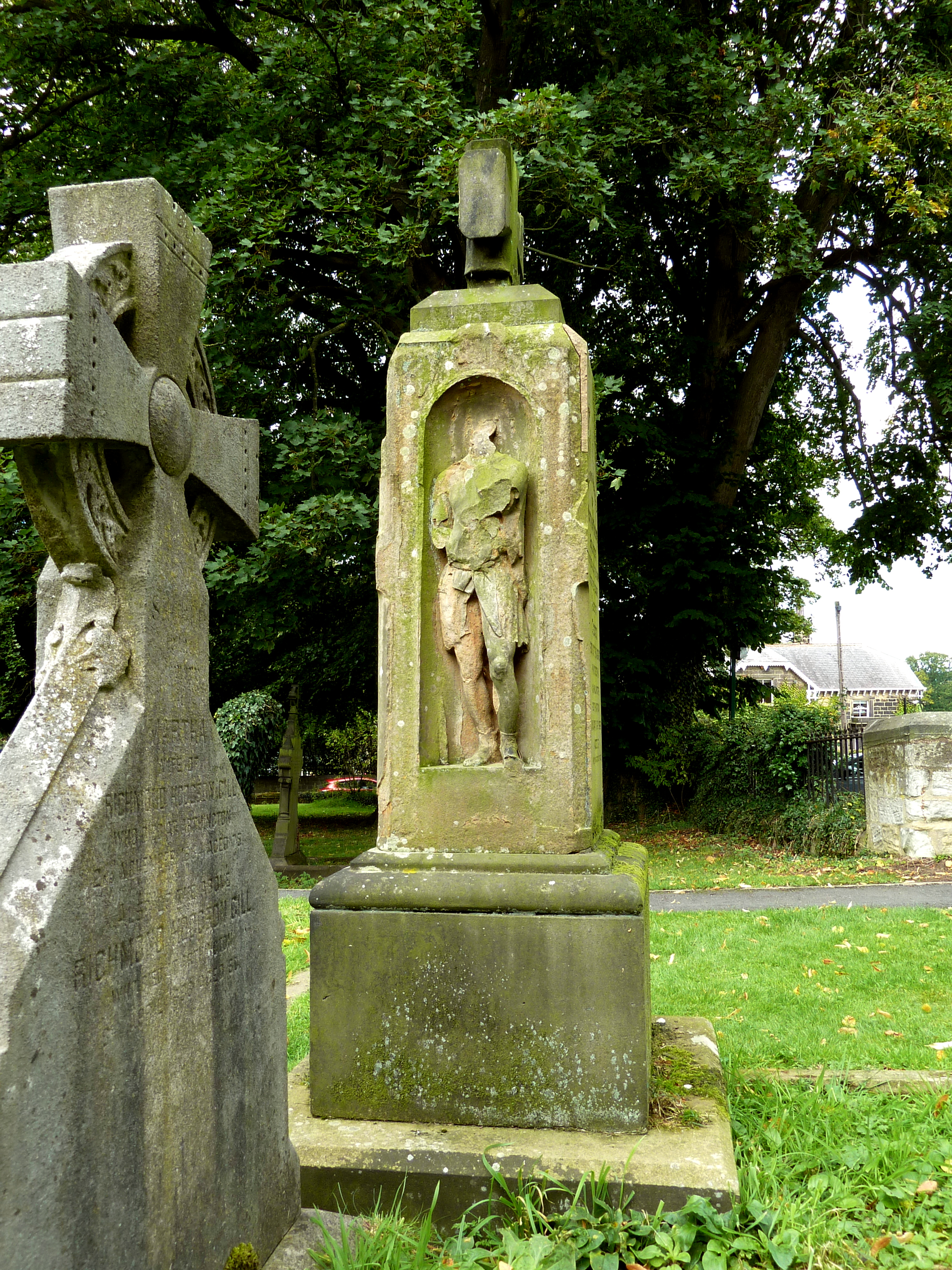
Gravestone of Matthew Taylor

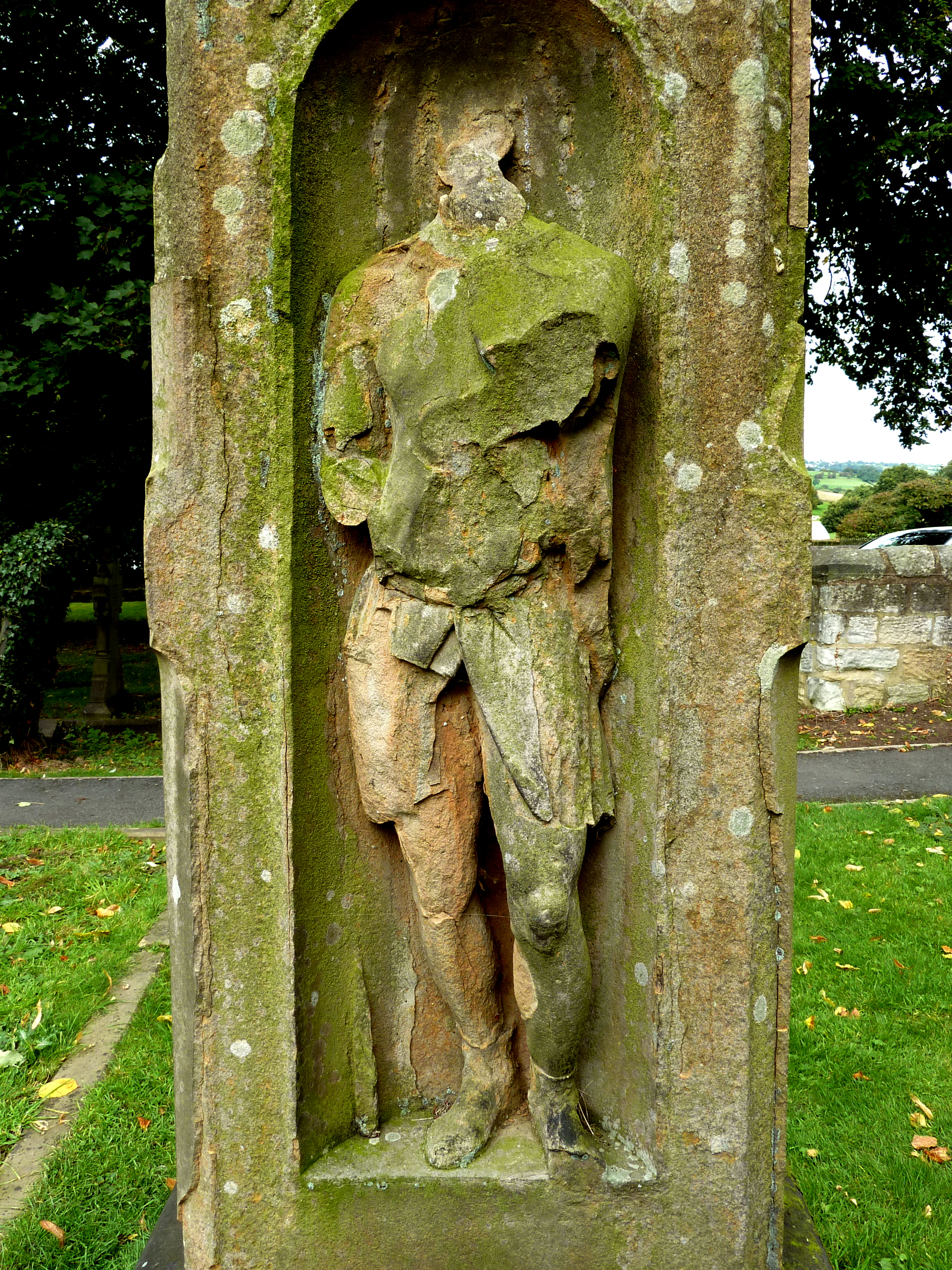

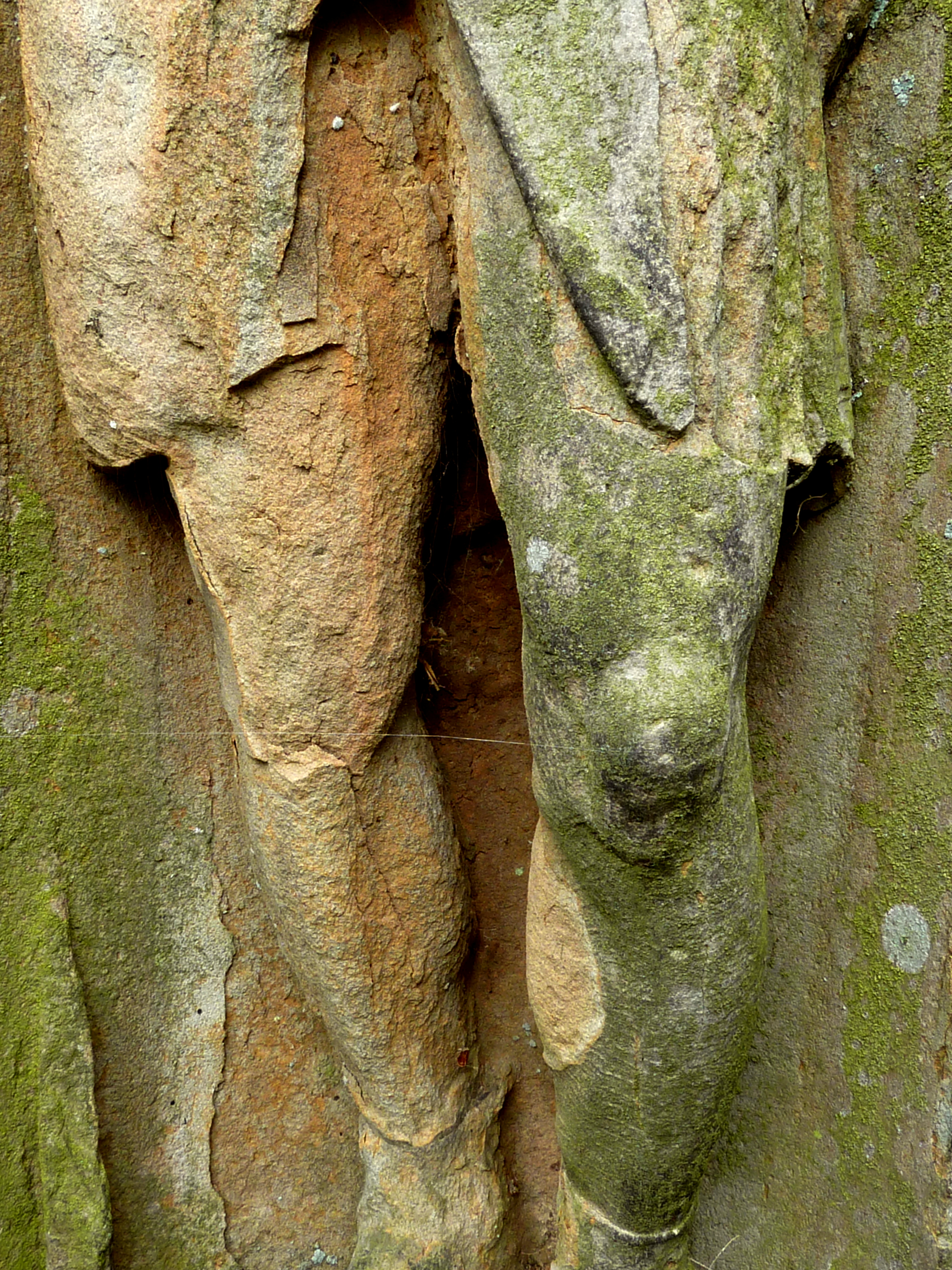
Sculpture possibly by Benjamin Payler

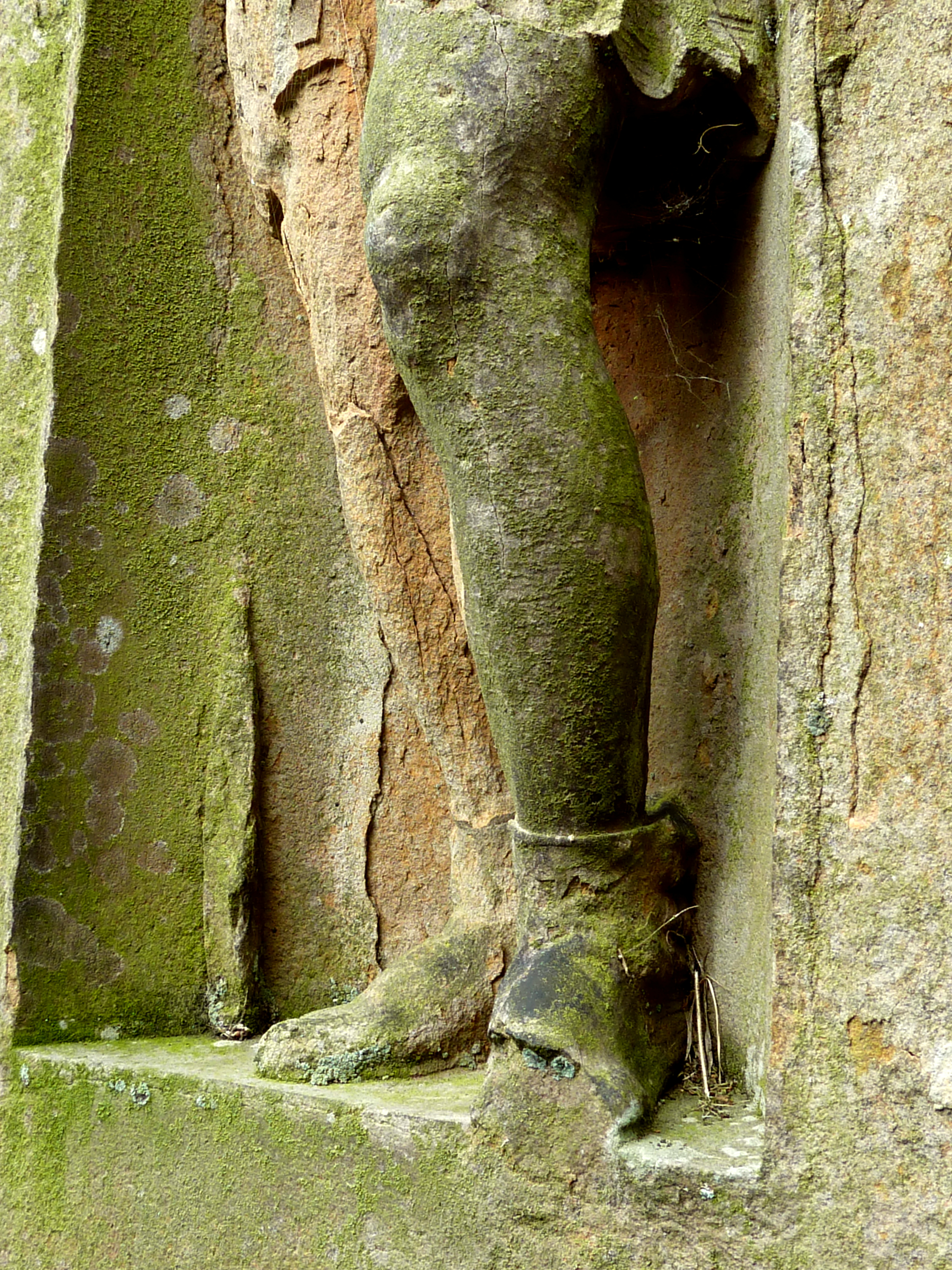

== Works by Burstall and Taylor ==
Known works of general architectural sculpture by Burstall and Taylor are:

- St Stephen's Church, Kirkstall, 1864 (Renovation 1864)
- St Mary, Hunslet, 1864 (Built 1864)
- St Oswald, Fulford, 1866 (Built 1866)
- Grand Hotel (Scarborough) (Built 1863–1867)
- Christchurch Congregational Church, Ilkley, 1868 (Built 1868)
- Bolton Town Hall, 1870 (Main staircase and portico, lions either side of the stairs, general sculpture within and without building)
- Sandal Parish Church, Wakefield, 1873 (Renovation 1873)

== Works by Matthew Taylor ==
Taylor exhibited a number of works at Leeds Art Gallery, but as of 2017 its collection no longer contained any of his works. In support of his work, he took an interest in the local fauna; an example of a plaster cast of fishes is listed below. He contributed some finds to the scientific department of the Mechanics' Institute at Pateley Bridge: for example a hummingbird hawk-moth caught at his home village of Arthington on 31 July 1883. He also contributed to Leeds Naturalists' Club a live noctule bat which he caught while fishing near Arthington on 28 May 1883.

=== Former Queen's Hotel, Leeds, 1863 ===
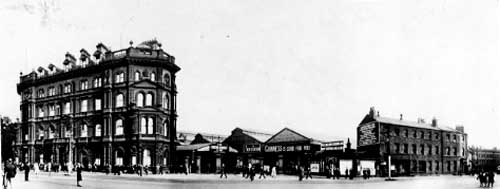
Old Queen's Hotel, before 1935

This hotel preceded the present Queens Hotel, Leeds. The West Midland Railway Company decided to build the hotel at a meeting on 16 August 1859, and in 1861 it was authorised by the Midland Railway Act of Parliament. It was designed by Perkin & Backhouse, built by W. Nicholson & Son, and was "of a very ornate character, in the Italian style of architecture." In 1867 and 1898, new wings were added, designed by C.T. Trubshaw. The hotel opened on 10 January 1863.

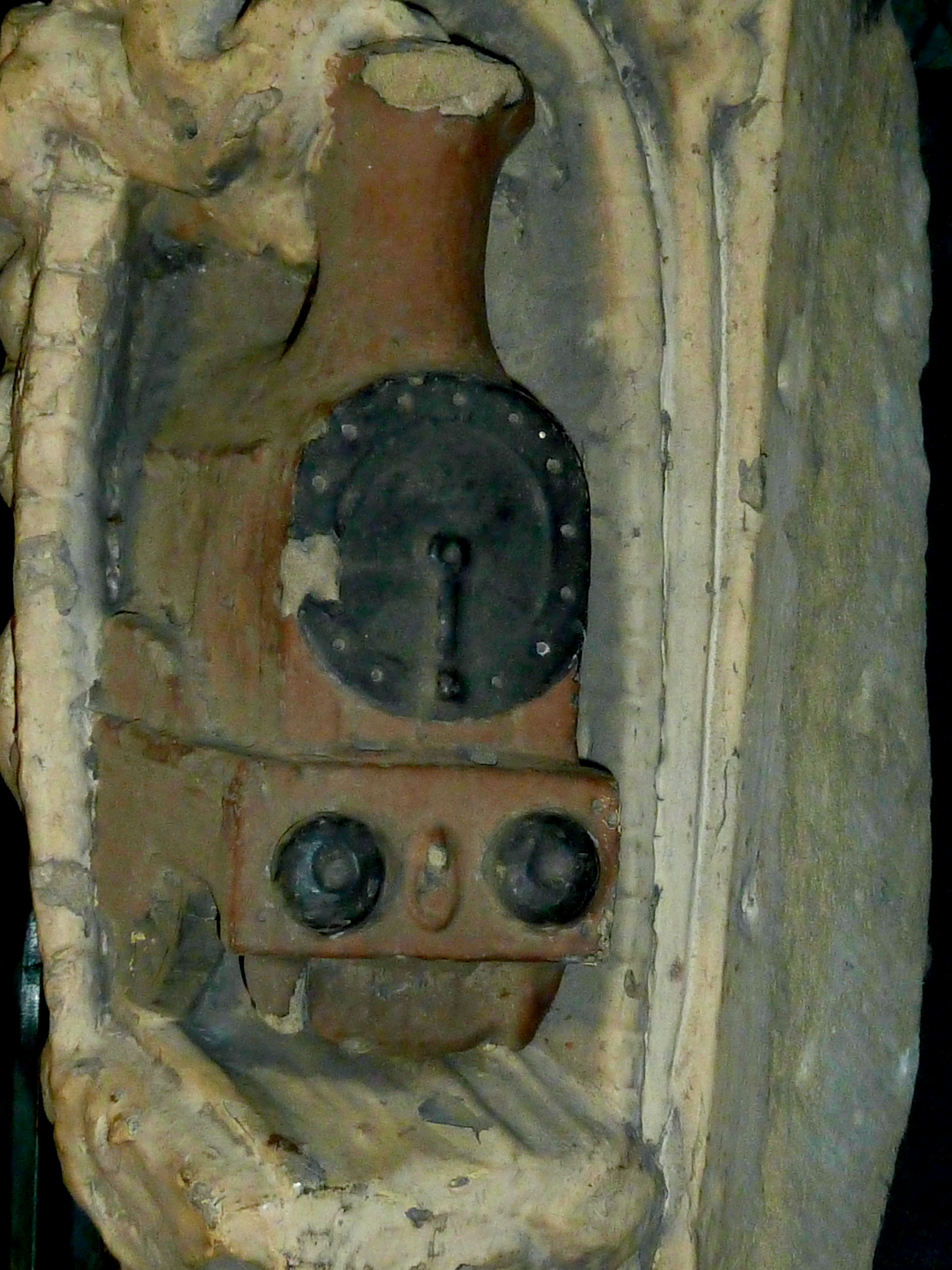
The locomotive carved above the entrance (now in Leeds Industrial Museum at Armley Mills)

The old Queen's Hotel included "carvings of a railway engine puffing out of a tunnel (near the main entrance), a fiddle, bottle of wine, game, fruit etc. There were also ram's heads, festoons of ivy leaves, and "some beautiful carvings of human heads with tolerably pleasant countenances."

"This decorative work was executed by a Leeds sculptor Matthew Taylor ... He has a son and granddaughter still living in Leeds." "On one occasion a lecturer on art took members of a club to see this carving. They were scanning the walls of the Queen's with field glasses, so the story goes, and attracted attention sufficient to draw a crowd. The crowd grew to large proportions and the traffic was impeded. The police arrived and dispersed the crowd - and, the story continues, dispersed the members of the club before they had properly scrutinised the carving." This carving included grapes and a bottle, a violin, partridges, pheasants and pears. By 1935 the carvings were "blackened by age, and pass unnoticed unless they are closely sought. An old employee at the Queen's says he has often been asked to show visitors the railway engine coming out of the tunnel. There are bearded faces also peering down from the walls." Demolition man Mr Edwin Airey ... said ... "If anything of real value is found during the demolition, we shall doubtless do our best to preserve it; but it is often difficult to remove stone carvings intact during a demolition of this kind." The Queen's Hotel was demolished in September 1935.

Media related to Old Queen's Hotel, Leeds at Wikimedia Commons

=== Portrait bust of the Artist's Father, before 1873 ===
This bust of William Taylor (1793–1873) was exhibited at the Yorkshire Fine Art Society's First Spring Exhibition, in Leeds, on 1 June 1880.

=== Gravestone of William Taylor, or "Angler's Tomb", after May 1873 ===
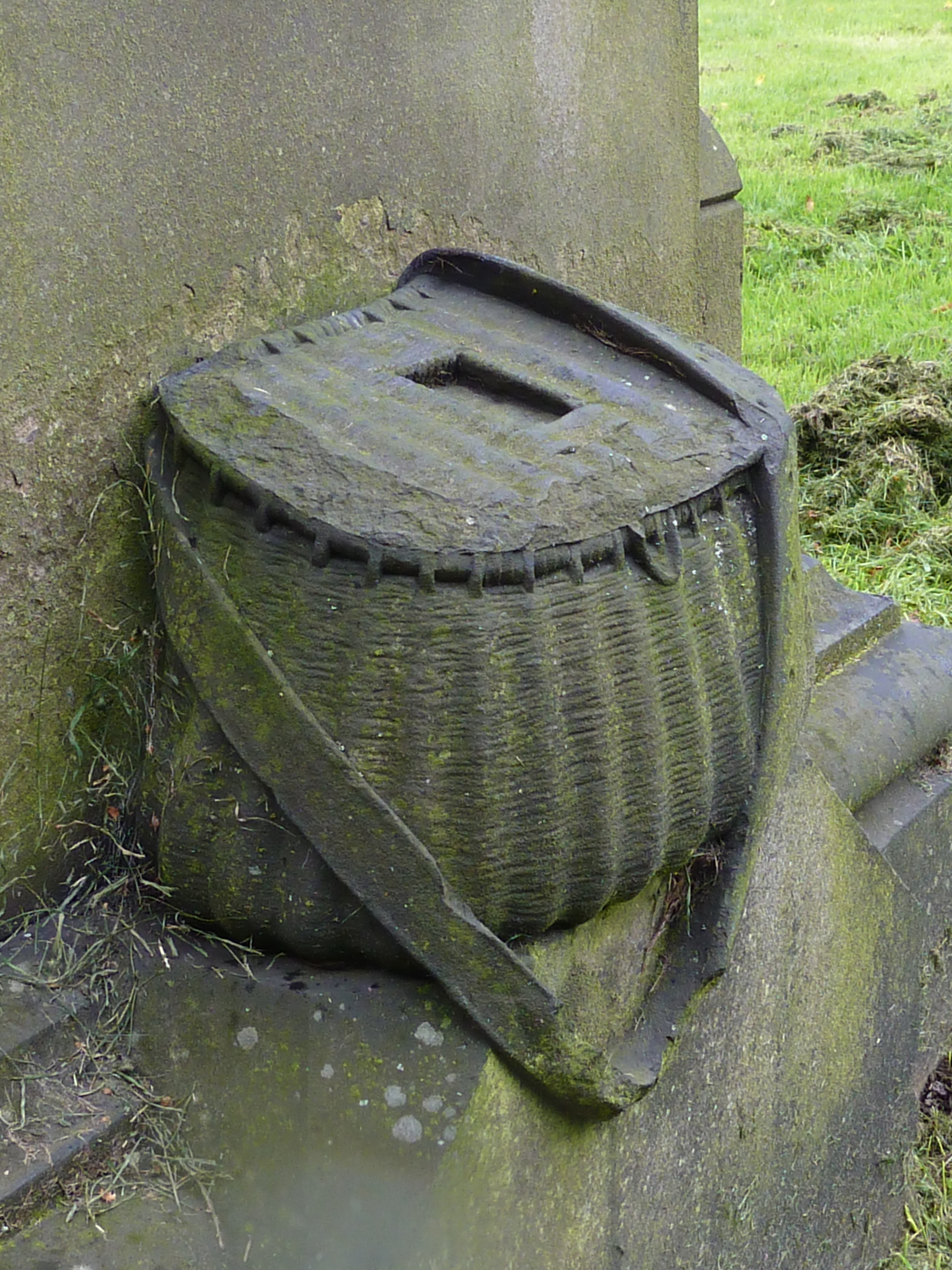
Fish basket on Angler's Tomb

This is a Grade II listed monument, listed for its "finely carved lettering and figures." Matthew Taylor's father William died on 24 May 1873 and was buried in Woodhouse Cemetery four days later. Matthew was the "gifted sculptor" of William's gravestone, known as the "Angler's Tomb". As of 2017, the gravestone has been removed from the right to the left side of the chapel at Woodhouse Cemetery, and the kingfisher is missing from the top of the monument. The illustration of fishing in the Wharfe has weathered, obscuring the face of William Taylor and the view of Grewelthorpe on the far bank. The Reverend William Thomas Adey (1844–1925), who was pastor of Burley Road Baptist Church, Leeds 1870–1878, and a friend of Matthew, wrote about this "beautiful and interesting memorial" in 1905 as follows:

"It is the tomb of that of an ancient angler, old William Taylor, of Grewelthorpe. Situated on the right hand side of the chapel at Woodhouse Cemetery ... it does one's heart good to see in it a memorial of filial affection and of exquisite good taste. The monumental slab at the head of the grave is thicker than usual, so as to give a good appearance when viewed edgeway. As if resting for a moment on the apex is a kingfisher, beautifully posed with a minnow in its mouth. In the upper part of the stone above the inscription are three trout, arranged in a triangle as an ecclesiastical symbol of the Trinity. Beneath, and occupying a large part of the face, is a sunk medallion with a representation of the stream, with Grewelthorpe village on the farther bank, and with the old man in the foreground playing a trout, whilst the son, who was the gifted sculptor of the tomb, is receiving it in the landing net. The figures are portraits and are in fine preservation. On the plinth of the tomb, as if left there once for all, is a wonderful facsimile, in actual size though in stone, of the fish basket with strap and buckle. Finally, at the shoulders of the stone are, beautifully represented in medallions and in natural size, a water-ousel and a kingfisher, one on either side ... The writer was a Leeds pastor, and Mr. Taylor, the younger, was an old waterside companion in occasional visits to the Wharfe, at Arthington and Pool ... It is evident that even now a process of settlement is working damage, and an encroaching Aucuba japonica is concealing one of the most beautifully designed tombstones in this, or any other country." (Leeds Mercury 24 June 1905)

Media related to Woodhouse Cemetery, Angler's Tomb at Wikimedia Commons

=== Plaster casts of fishes, 1875 ===
In 1875, the Leeds Mercury noted that plaster casts of fishes shown to the Leeds Naturalists' Field Club by Matthew Taylor were "objects of great interest."

=== Bust of Baron de Vasceoncellos, before 1880 ===
This bust of an unidentified member of the Vasconcelos family of Portuguese nobility was exhibited at the Yorkshire Fine Art Society's First Spring Exhibition, 1880.

=== St George and the Dragon, before 1880 ===
This Caen stone sculpture was exhibited at the Yorkshire Fine Art Society's First Spring Exhibition on 1 June 1880 and valued at £10 10s. The piece was again exhibited at Leeds City Art Gallery's Spring Exhibition in 1889 in case F.

=== Portrait bust of the Artist's Son, before 1880 ===
This portrait bust of the artist's son was exhibited at the Yorkshire Fine Art Society's First Spring Exhibition, in Leeds, on 1 June 1880

=== Bust of George Broughton, before 1880 ===
George Broughton (b.1842) was an iron founder and engineer who was one of the owners of Kirklees Iron Works, Mill Lane, Clifton, Dewsbury. The works was large, and established in 1864. It was demolished in 2017, and a supermarket was built on the site. This terracotta portrait bust of him was exhibited at the Yorkshire Fine Art Society's First Spring Exhibition, in Leeds, on 1 June 1880. The terracotta version could be ordered for £10 10s, and a marble version could be commissioned for £70.

=== Statues of boy and girl, Former School Board offices, Leeds, 1879–1881 ===
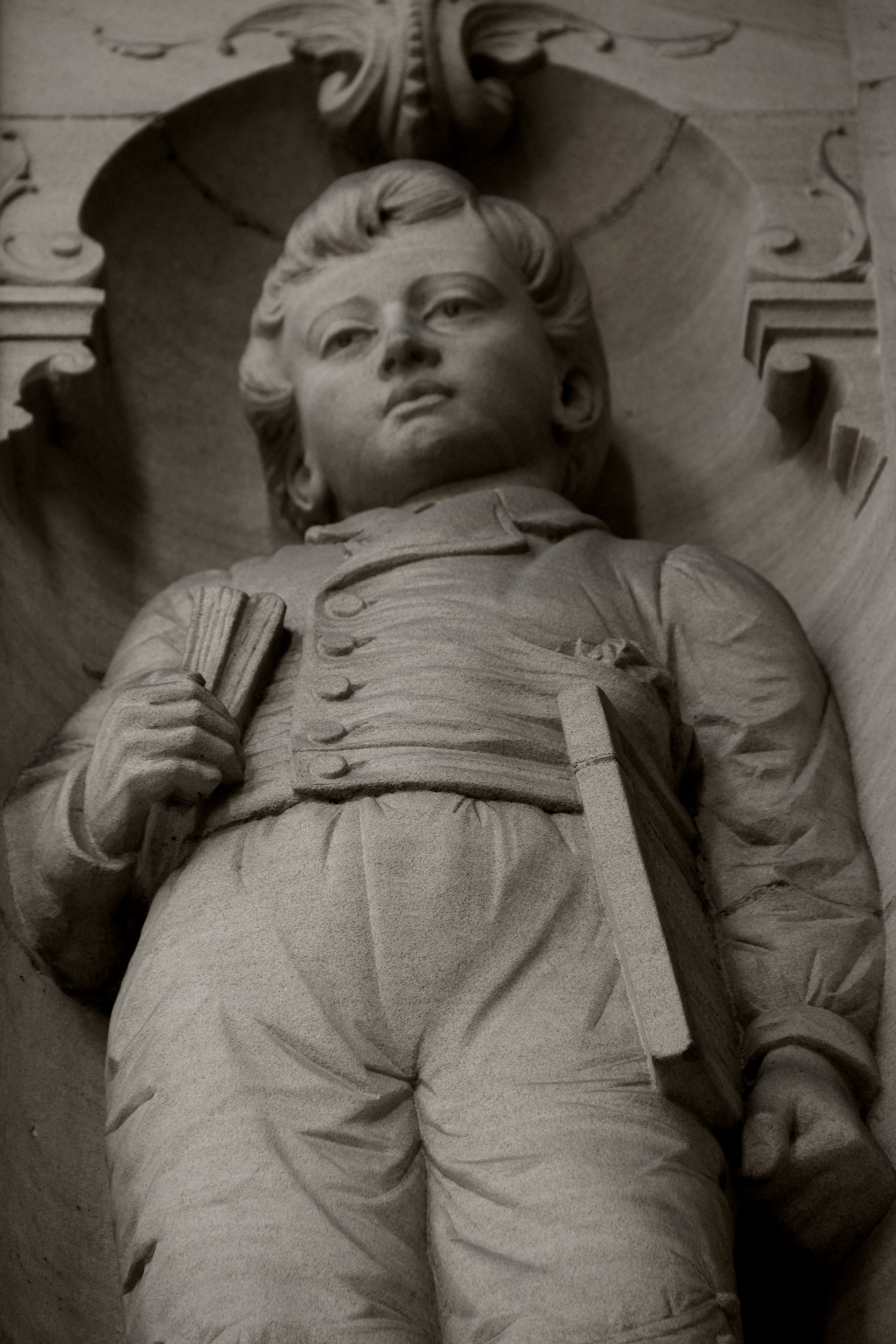
Frank by Taylor

The former Leeds School Board building, in Calverley Street, Leeds, West Yorkshire, is a Grade II* listed building. It was designed by George Corson. Benjamin Payler carved the exterior details of the building, and Matthew Taylor executed the statues of a boy and girl placed just inside the main entrance. In 1881 the Leeds Mercury said:

"Entering by the principal doorway in Calverley Street, it will be noticed that in the jambs of the archway are carved full-length figures, emblematical of School Board work. They represent a boy and girl on their way to school. The work has been carefully executed, and reflects credit on the sculptor, Mr. Matthew Taylor, of Leeds." (Leeds Mercury 29 September 1881)

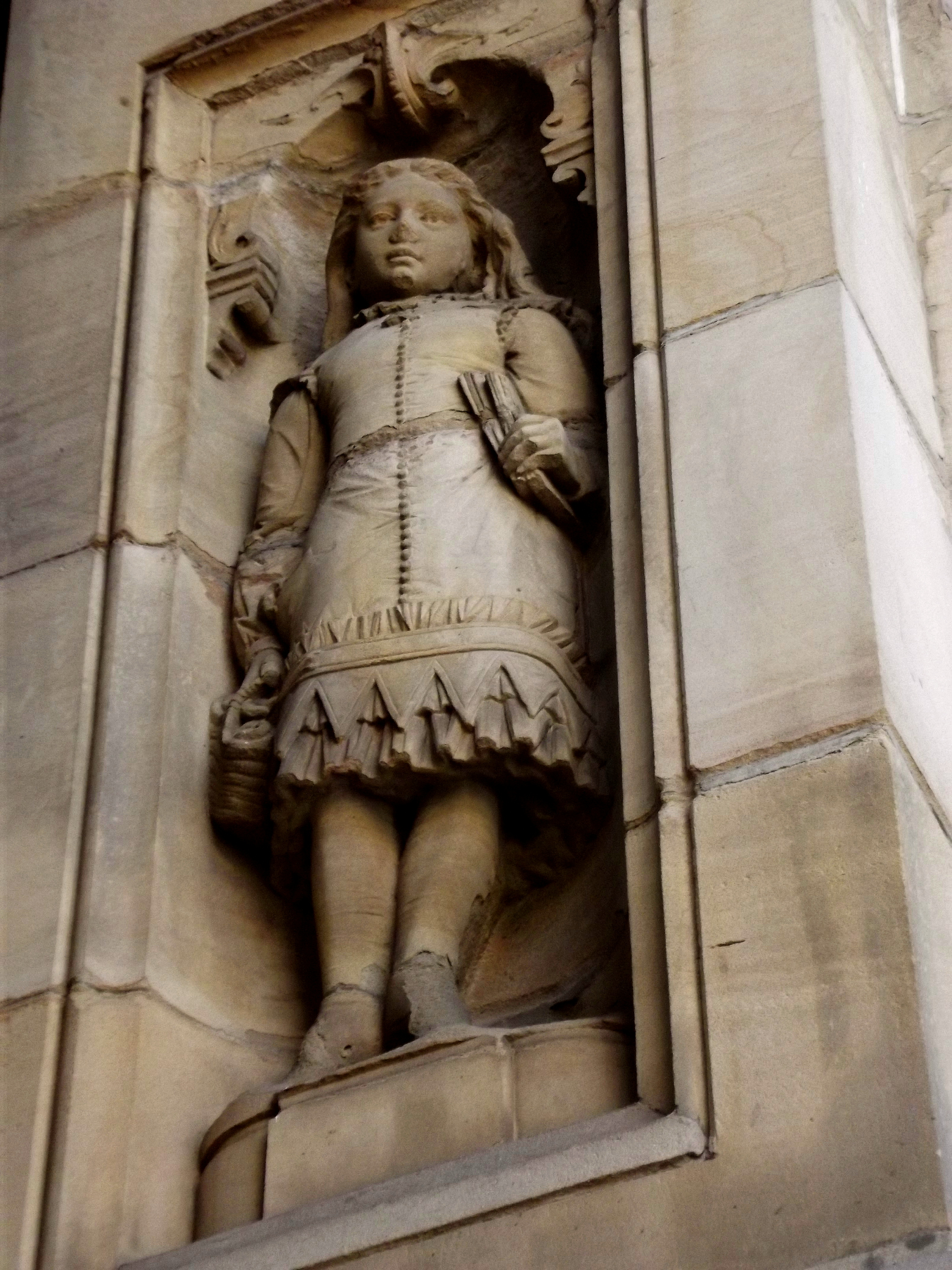
Molly by Taylor

This pair of sculptures is known informally as Frank and Molly. The model for the sculpture of the girl was Mary Isabel Ingleby (Leeds, 1868 – Pickering, 1925) She was the daughter of William Ingleby (b. Leeds, 1834), a lithographic writer, and his wife Jane (b. Patrington or Partington 1837), and in 1881 they were living at 5 Regent Park Terrace, Headingley, Leeds. However, the 1871 Census shows them living at 16 Hillary Street, Leeds, five doors away from Matthew Taylor. Mary Ingleby married William Dibble Pollitt (1859–1940), a chemist, in 1890. In 1881 when her sculpted portrait was unveiled, she was about thirteen years old and still a scholar. The model for the sculpture of the boy was the eldest son of Matthew Taylor, who was also about thirteen years old in 1881. He was artist-sculptor Francis Bertram Taylor (1868–1950). "The figure of the boy, with hair nicely parted and carrying a slate and book ... is supposed to be the image of the sculptor's son, Mr Frances B. Taylor, who now (as of 1935) lives in retirement in Leeds ... These facts were given ... by Mrs E. Farmery ... granddaughter of Matthew Taylor." It is reasonable to suppose that the carving was begun in 1879, since the sculpted models are apparently younger than thirteen years old.

Media related to Leeds School Board building, statues at Wikimedia Commons

=== Leeds Municipal Buildings (now Leeds Central Library) 1879–1884 ===
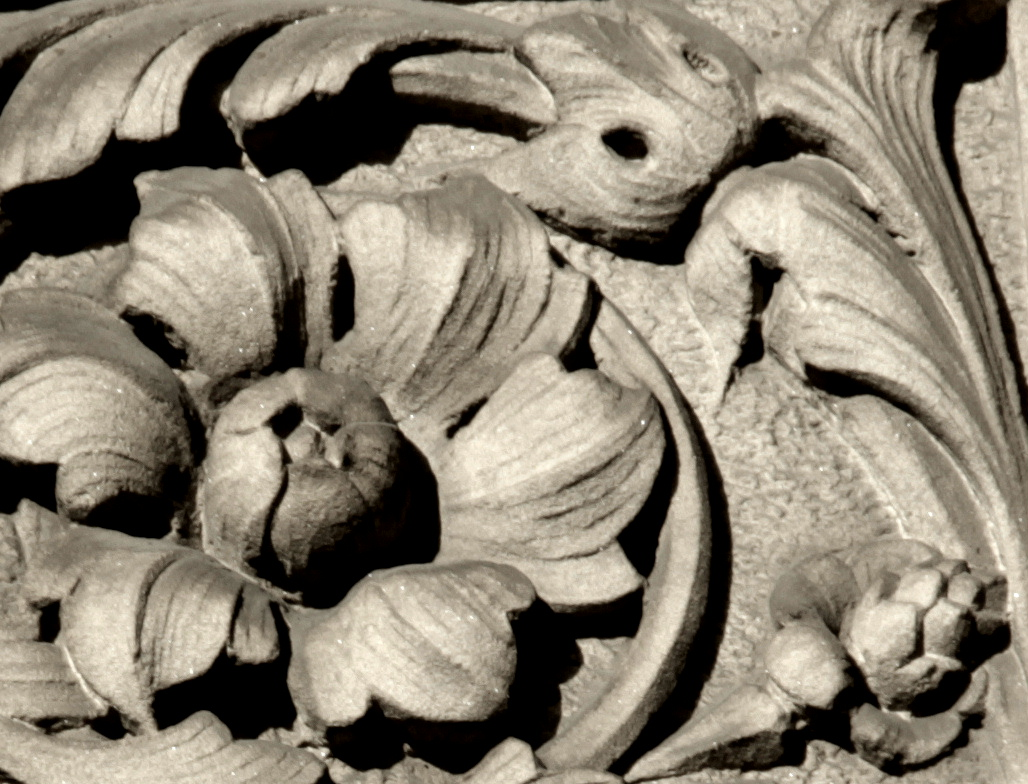
Carving on Leeds Central Library

This is a Grade II* listed building, designed by George Corson and opened on 16 April 1884. Matthew Taylor may have been responsible for the lion-dog carvings on the interior stair rail, bearing in mind his interest in wildlife at Leeds Naturalists' Field Club, his presence with Benjamin Burstall at Bolton Town Hall when an unidentified predator escaped into the rafters there, and Matthew's signature portrait near the roof above those carvings. The exterior carving was executed by Matthew Taylor and Benjamin Payler.

Media related to Leeds Central Library, carvings at Wikimedia Commons

=== Medallion portrait of Reverend William Busfield, before 1885 ===
Reverend William Busfield (1801–1885) was a Rural Dean with an MA from University College, Oxford, and rector of St Andrews, Keighley, from 1840 to 1871. He brought about his own dismissal for championing Anglicanism too much against Dissenters, and retired to East Cave, Brough.

His medallion portrait by Taylor was exhibited in July 1886 at the Leeds Society of Artists' exhibition, being described by the Yorkshire Post as a "clever piece of work." The newspaper thought he had "devoted himself to a great extent to the painting of still life, and in his self-imposed task he [had] met with considerable success." The medallion portrait was also exhibited at Leeds City Art Gallery's Spring Exhibition, 1889.

=== Relief bust of Gladstone, 1887 ===
In 1881 the Leeds Liberal Club moved from South Parade to the Royal Insurance Buildings (demolished after 1960) in Park Row. In 1887 the interior was renovated to include a rearrangement of rooms, fittings and furnishings, after which the club was reopened on Thursday 9 June. The works included a "happy likeness in a relievo bust" of Gladstone over a fireplace, by Matthew Taylor. The Leeds Mercury said: "On one of the mantels was a large bust of Mr Gladstone in low relief by Mr Matthew Taylor, a local sculptor. The likeness of the great statesman is a most happy one, and brings to light an artificer of no small talent." In 1891 the Leeds Liberal Club moved into new premises at 9 Quebec Street, Leeds, but there is no evidence that this carving was re-installed there, so this piece may now be lost.

=== Medallion portrait of W. E. Gladstone, before 1889 ===
This basso-relievo portrait of Gladstone was exhibited at Leeds City Art Gallery, in the Spring Exhibition of 1889. This may have been the unknown work which he exhibited at The Leeds Fine Art Gallery exhibition in 1888.

== See also ==
- Robert Mawer
- Catherine Mawer
- Charles Mawer
- Benjamin Payler
- Benjamin Burstall
- Mawer and Ingle
- William Ingle
