= Benjamin Burstall =

British sculptor, architectural sculptor and stone carver

- Born: 15 October 1835; Holbeck, West Riding of Yorkshire
- Died: 14 January 1876 (aged 40); Leeds
- Resting place: Woodhouse Cemetery
- Notable work: Sculpture on Bolton Town Hall (with Matthew Taylor)
- Style: Aesthetic movement Romanticism; Neoclassicism

Benjamin Burstall (15 October 1835 – 14 January 1876) was a sculptor, architectural sculptor and stone carver, based in Leeds, West Riding of Yorkshire, England.

== Background ==
Burstall's father was master mariner and ship owner Nathaniel Burstall (Hull 1801 – Hunslet 1854), and his mother was Maria. He was born on 15 October 1835 in Holbeck, West Riding of Yorkshire, and his birth was registered in a nonconformist church. He was married to Sarah Mather (1838–1889) on 3 October 1857 at St Peter's, Leeds (now Leeds Minster). They had at least six children, all born in Leeds: Harry Barton (1859–1936), Frank Gilbert, (b.1861) who became a telegraph operator and emigrated to Canso, Nova Scotia, Nell Gwynne (1863–1905) who married Edwin Armitage Hobson in 1889, Victor Hugo (1865–1951), Lewis Belgrave (1869–1904), and Lauri (b.1870) who emigrated from Liverpool to New York on 17 February 1892, with a Miss Charlotte Copeland, aged 21, who shared the same ticket number.

Burstall died of tuberculosis on 14 January 1876, aged 40 years, in Leeds. He was buried alongside his mother and father in Woodhouse Cemetery, Leeds, in plot 4653. He left £600, and one of the executors of his will was his business partner Matthew Taylor of Arthington.

== Career ==
From 1861 Burstall was working in partnership with Matthew Taylor (1837–1889), as Burstall and Taylor, Sculptors, based in Cookridge Street, Leeds. In 1861 he was describing himself as a sculptor, and by 1871 he was employing two men and two boys.

== Works by Burstall and Taylor ==
=== St Mary, Hunslet, 1862–1864 ===
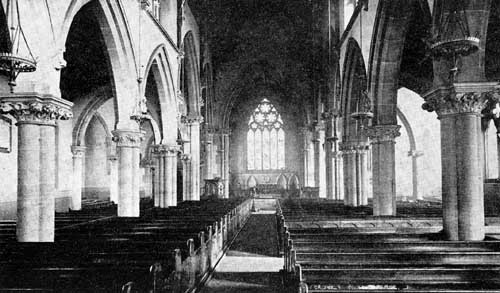
1864 view of nave, showing carved capitals

This church, on Church street, Hunslet, Leeds, was designed by Perkin and Backhouse to replace a smaller one, due to the increasing size of the congregation. The foundation stone was laid in June 1862 by Mr B. Ingham, a local benefactor. The church was consecrated on Thursday 21 July 1864 by the Bishop of Ripon. The building had a tower, spire, clock, aisles and transepts. Inside were clustered shafts with carved capitals. The east and west windows were by Clayton and Bell of London, and the Caen stone reredos and font were by Burstall and Taylor. Only the tower remains, after the nave was rebuilt, and consecrated on 9 July 1975. St Mary's was at risk of closure in 2015, due to heating failure and deterioration of the fabric of the 20th-century building. (Note: For images of this building, please see Commons category:St Mary the Virgin church, Hunslet)

=== St Stephen, Kirkstall, 1863–1864 ===
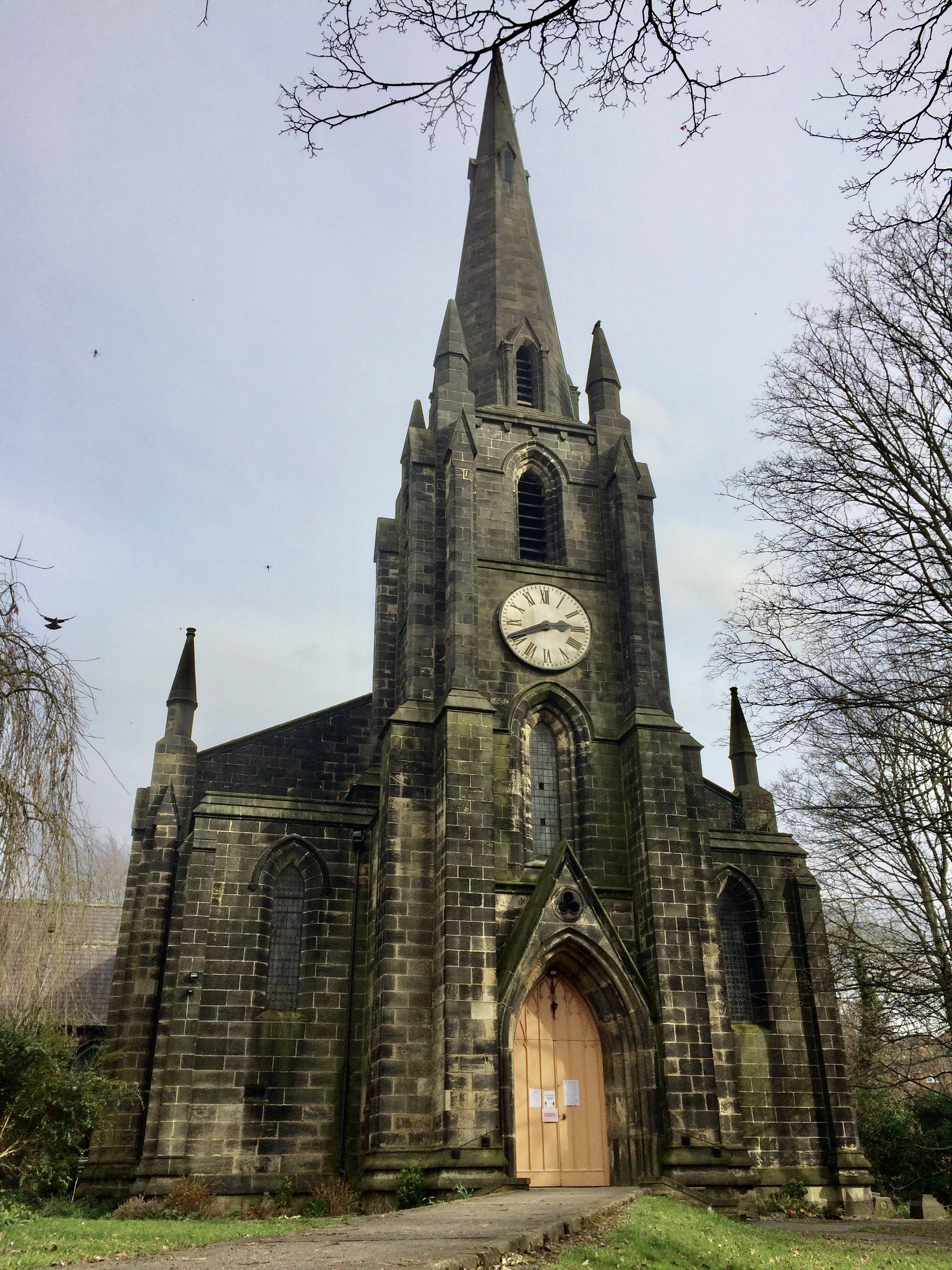
st Stephen, Kirkstall

This is a Grade II listed building, on Park Mount off Morris Lane, Kirkstall, West Yorkshire. It was designed by Robert Dennis Chantrell in 1828–1829. The church was reopened by the Bishop of Ripon on 17 August 1864, after a renovation by Perkin and Backhouse of Leeds, which created a "very ecclesiastical interior." The interior previously had box pews, a flat ceiling, three galleries and a three-decker pulpit. In the renovation which involved Burstall and Taylor, carved label stops were added to the chancel. The new roof beams in the chancel and transepts rested on carved corbels. The eight windows in the aisles to the transepts, and another in the south aisle in memory of Joseph Whitham, are by William Warrington. The Richard "Factory King" Oastler memorial window in the north aisle is by William Wailes. The memorial window dedicated to William Beckett in the south transept is by Prede. (Note: For images of this building, please see Commons category:St Stephen's Church, Kirkstall)

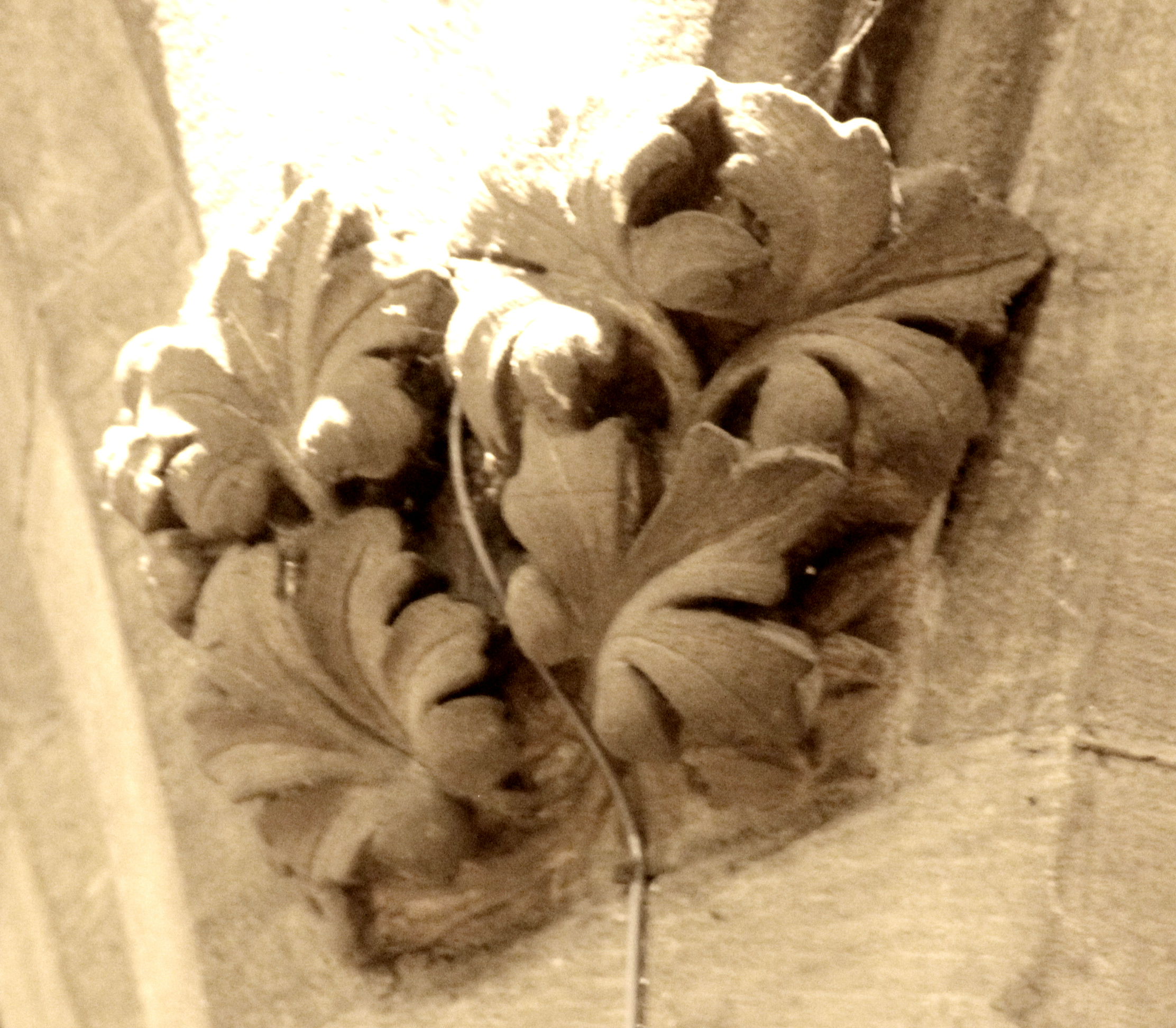
Label stop on arcade in nave

In 1864, the Leeds Intelligencer reported the following:

"On entering the church, the first thing which attracts attention is the font, which stands permanently in the centre of the aisle at the west end, with ample space all round it. It is executed of Caen stone, alabaster and marble; its dimensions are noble, and the design most unique. The bowl is square, having trefoil sunk panels on each side of the alabaster columns, and carved capitals at the angles. It is supported on an octagonal shaft, and brought onto the square with four emblematical angels. Each face has a sunk niche with red marble shafts and trefoil arched canopy, in which stand in bold relief the four evangelists on moulded pedestals. The base is boldly moulded, and of green Irish marble. The font is placed upon an elevated octagonal foot pace of blue and white stone, with sunk quatrefoil panels on each side, inlaid with various coloured marbles. This delicate and chastely-executed piece of work was done by Messrs. Burstall and Taylor of Cookridge-street." (Leeds Intelligencer 13 August 1864)

=== St Oswald, Fulford, 1866 ===
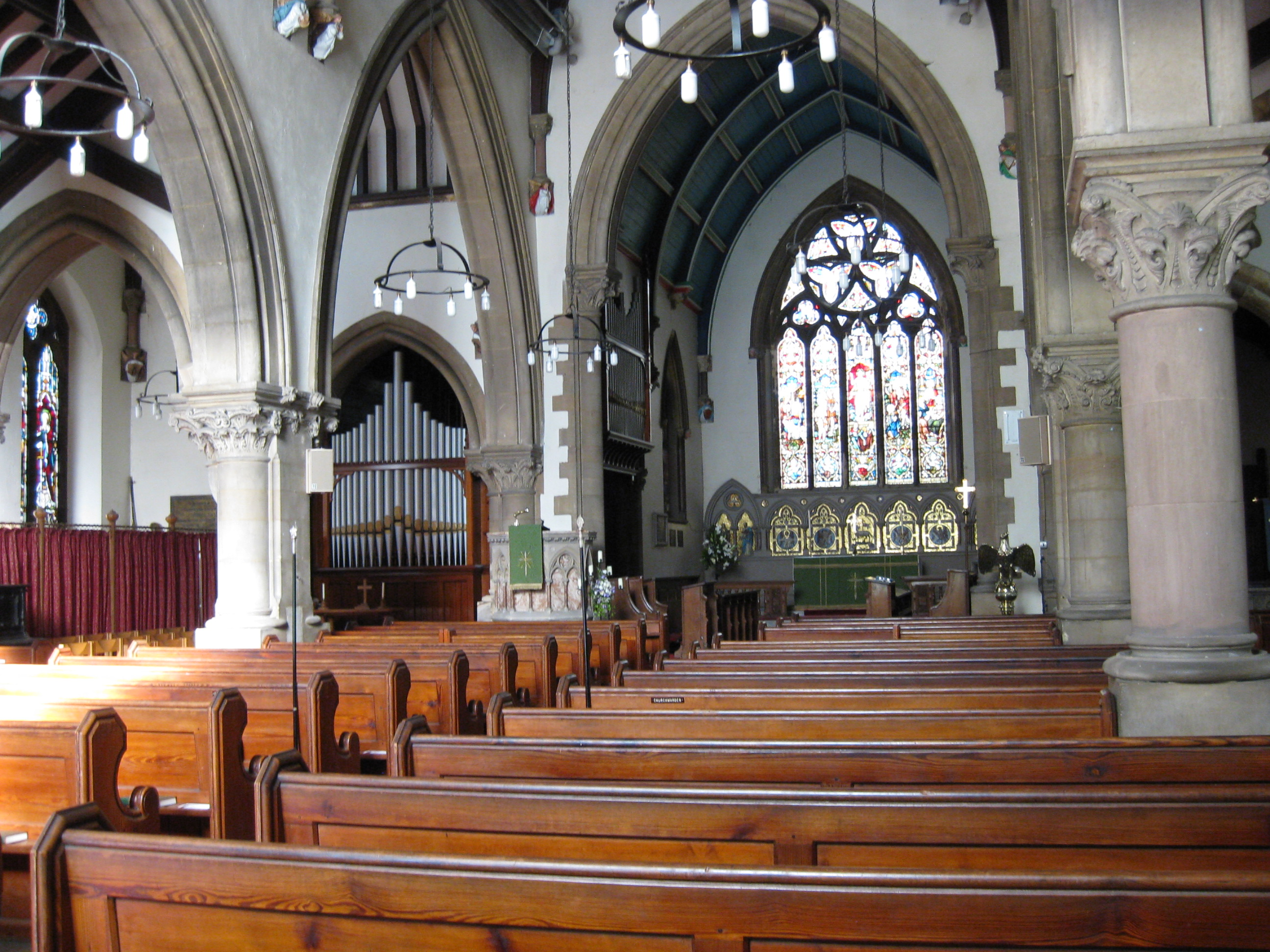
Interior of St Oswald Fulford in 2011

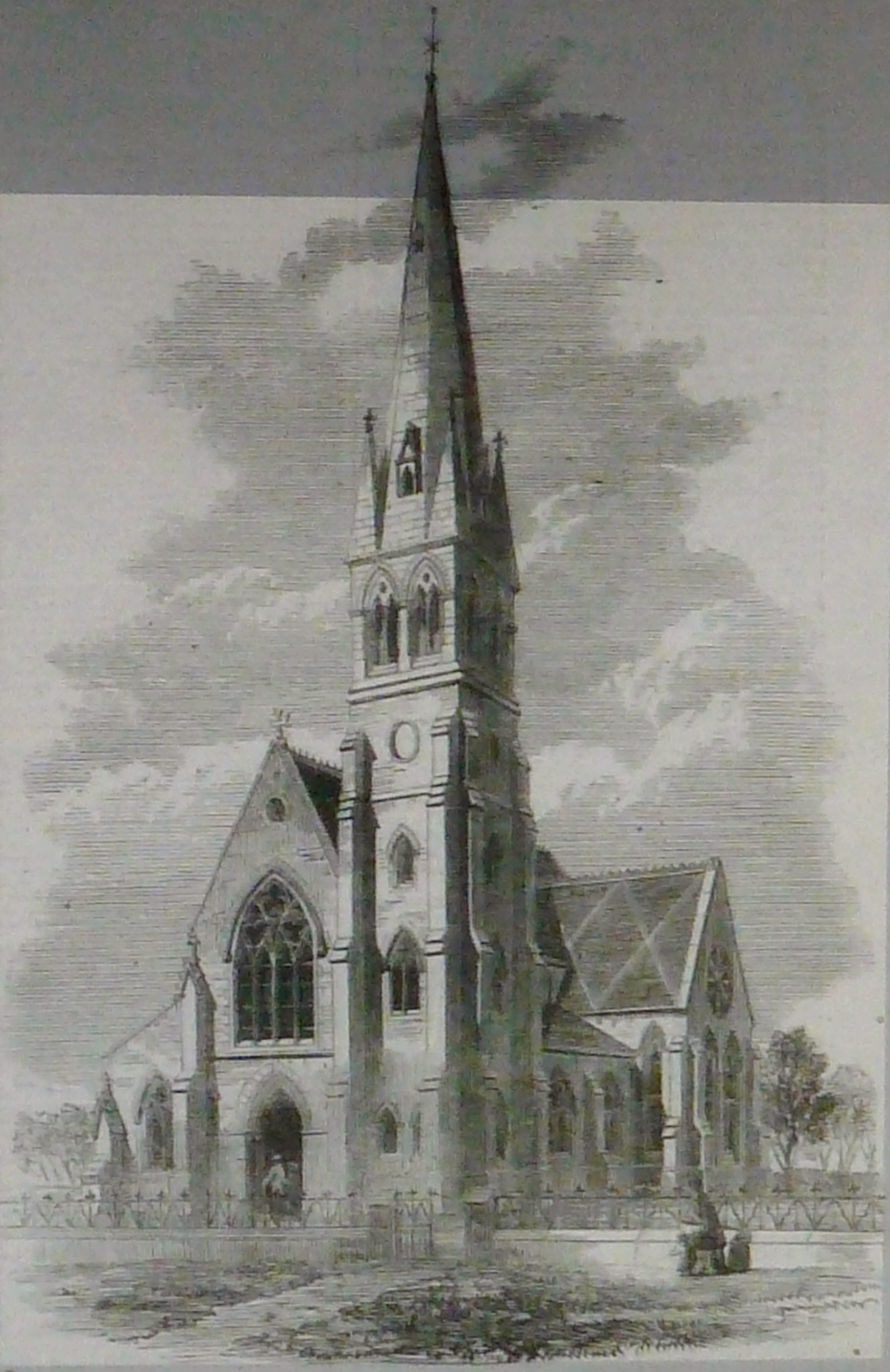
St Oswald's in 1868

This is a Grade II listed building. St Oswald replaced a smaller church. Costing £4,788, it was designed for 450 sittings with a spire and transepts by James Pigott Pritchett junior of Darlington (son of James Pigott Pritchett). It was consecrated by the Archbishop of York on Monday 24 December 1866. The tower had lost its spire by 1960. Taylor & Burstall provided the architectural carving.

(The tower below the spire was) "highly ornamented at the belfry stage, having two windows on each face, with shafts of red stone in deeply recessed jambs, finished by carved caps supporting richly moulded arches and which, with carved strings and bold cornice surmounting the whole, give a very rich effect to this portion of the design ... The west front ... has a double recessed and shafted doorway, with carved caps in the centre, and above a handsome four-light window, with moulded jambs, mullions and tracery, having also carved caps and moulded bases; on each side are buttresses with carved, crocketted canopies ... (The clerestory windows) have label moulds. The ends of the transepts have each two long two-light windows, surmounted by a handsome rose window, having red stone shafts, carved caps, moulded tracery, label moulds &c ... The nave is divided from the aisles and transepts by pillars of red stone ... These have very elaborately carved caps ... The aisles of the chancel are divided from it by double arches with similar bases and caps, and with moulded spandrels ... The principal rafters of the roof are supported by carved angel corbels ... The east end has a reredos with red stone shafts, carved caps and moulded arches ... The carving (other than the pulpit, font and woodcarving) has been done by Messrs Burstall & Taylor of Leeds.(York Herald, 29 December 1866)

Respecting the "very effective arcade between the nave and aisles, the Yorkshire Architectural Society said in 1867: "with a transition Norman aspect, the details of the caps are well designed from natural foliage, sufficiently but not over-conventionalized."

A fire broke out under the Brindley & Foster pipe organ, installed in 1875, shortly after 6.00am on Tuesday 13 February 1877, and much was destroyed apart from the outer walls, tower and vestry, which were saved by a "contingent from the barracks", or about a hundred men from the 6th Carabiniers commanded by Colonel Napier. A steam fire engine and a hundred policemen also arrived from York, but the destruction occurred within one and a half hours. By 1877 the reredos had been infilled with mosaic, but that was destroyed also, although the reredos itself was "not much injured". The parish registers were saved. The church was rebuilt in 1877 and survives as such today, although the belfry section of the tower has been remodelled. (Note: For images of this building, please see Commons category:St. Oswald's Church, Fulford)

=== Grand Hotel, Scarborough, 1863–1867 ===
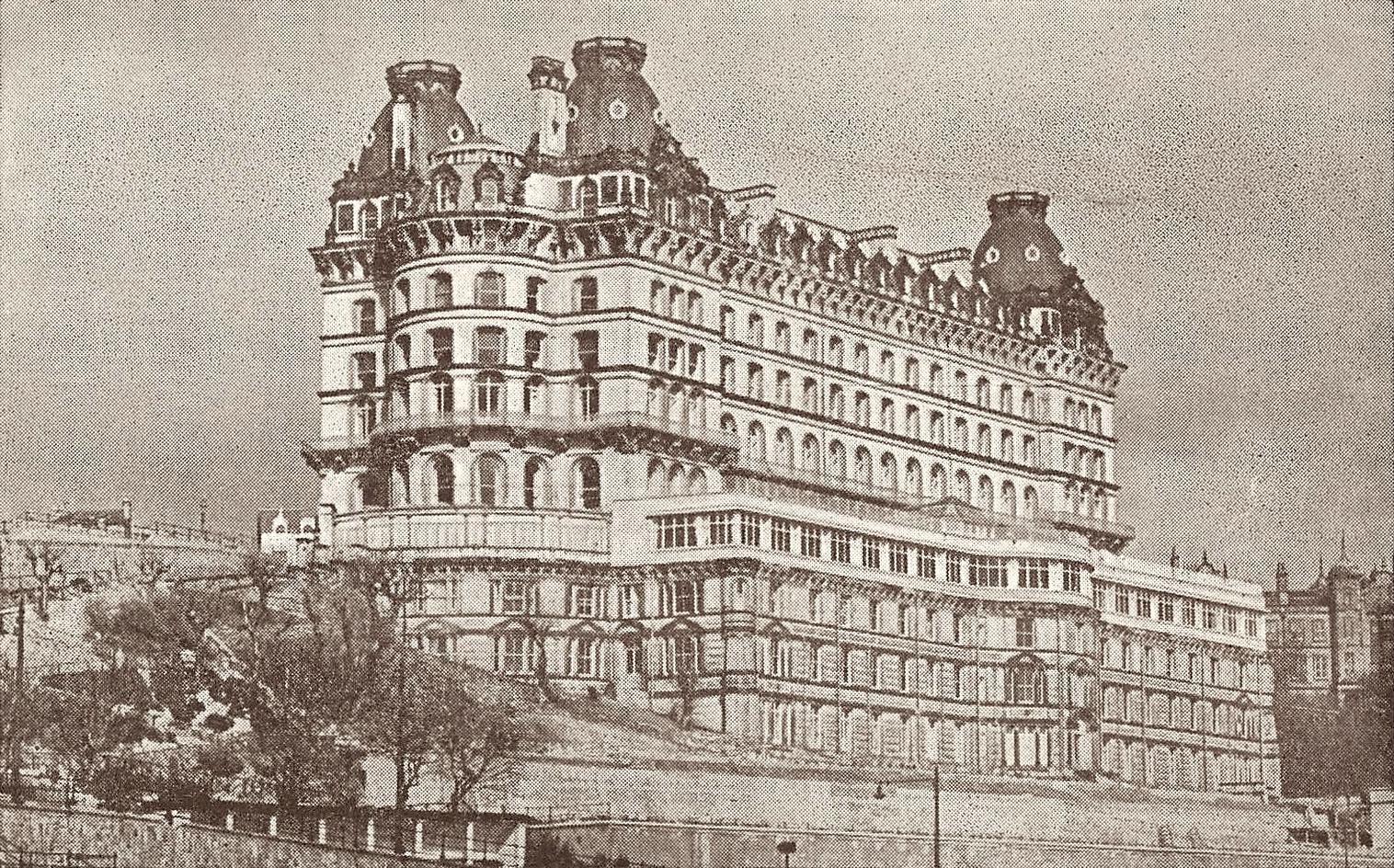
The Grand Hotel, 1921

This is a Grade II* listed building. The hotel, on St Nicholas Cliff in Scarborough, North Yorkshire, was designed by Cuthbert Brodrick and opened on 24 July 1867. The Yorkshire Evening Post said, "Examples of Matthew Taylor's work are to be seen on the Grand Hotel, Scarborough," however Taylor was in partnership with Burstall at this time, and the Grand Hotel commission was a major undertaking. The hotel was erected by the Scarborough Cliff Hotel Company, formed in 1862 with a capital of £120,000. In 1865, when it was half-built, the contractor failed and the building was sold. The Grand Hotel Company Ltd purchased the building, which was completed with a further £60,000. At least three fatal accidents occurred during the building. On Sunday 3 February 1867 a labourer named Tranmar was "lifting a large iron tank through one of the windows, when it suddenly slipped, and the unfortunate man was crushed between it and bhe brickwork. He was taken to the Dispensary, where it was found that he had broken one arm, and that his head and face were very much cut, the injuries to the former being so serious as to cause his death."

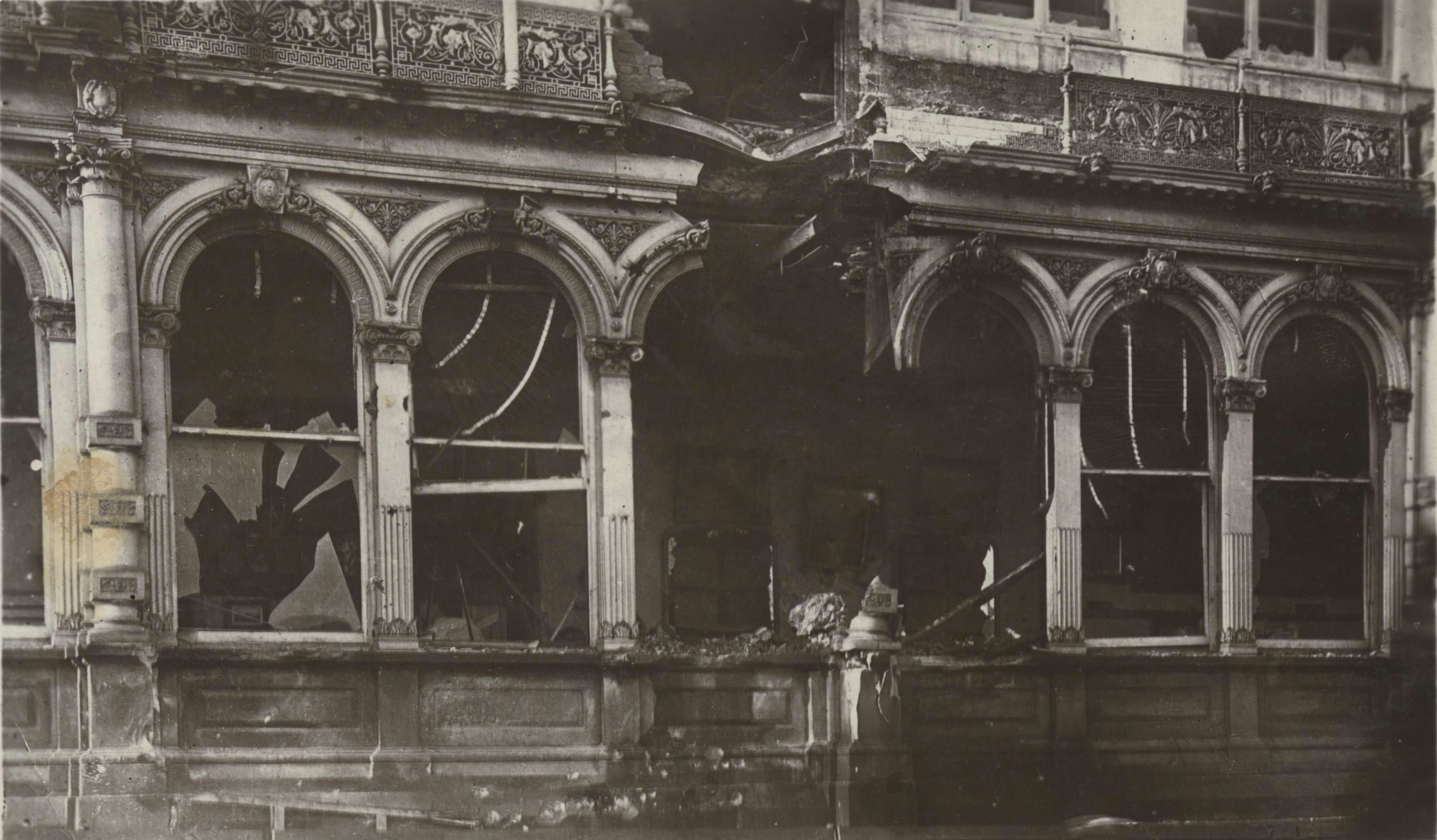
World War I shell damage to the cafe facade and stone carving

The hotel was built in the Italianate style of brick and terracotta with stone facings, and was one of the largest hotels in England at the time. The opening was marked by a banquet for 200 guests including Cuthbert Brodrick and a "Mr Taylor" on 24 July. In replying to a toast, the Rev. Canon Walker said that, "the architect had undoubtedly gained for himself a name that would hereafter be famous." A full dress ball took place on the following day. (Note: For images of this building, please see Commons category:Grand Hotel, Scarborough)

=== Christchurch Congregational Church, Ilkley, 1868–1869 ===
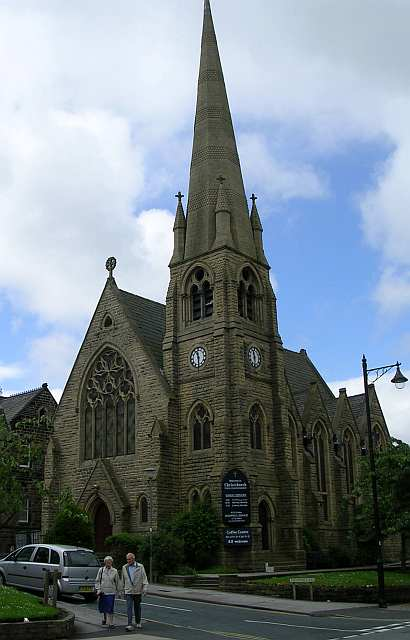
Christchurch, Ilkley

This is a Grade II listed building. The foundation stone of Christchurch Congregational church was laid by the Mayor of Bradford on 27 May 1868 at The Grove, Ilkley; originally on Riddings Road and Green Lane. The buildings (a church to seat 650, a school and a church keeper's house) were designed "in the early decorated style of Gothic architecture" by James Pigott Pritchett junior (1830–1910) of Darlington (son of James Pigott Pritchett) at a cost of around £5,000. Architectural carving was by Burstall & Taylor. It was opened on Wednesday 16 June 1869 before the 130-foot spire was completed. At the dinner after the opening ceremony the vice-chairman of the building committee "took objection to the inscriptions which were written round the walls of the Church, and expressed a desire to employ half-a-dozen plasterers to obliterate them." After drinking the health of the architect, the chairman said that "the excessive decoration perhaps might be pardonable so far as the architect was concerned, though he was not quite sure it was in accordance with perfect taste." The architect replied that "he was quite aware that the decoration was something novel in churches, but he was requested to undertake it." The Reverend B. Dale supported the inscriptions and was cheered.

The Leeds Mercury described the carving on the building thus: The church has carved capitals in the doorway, which has a crocketted gable, and above the doorway is a "stone floriated cross". The belfry windows in the last storey of the tower have "moulded tracery supported by carved and moulded pillars ... "The (interior) decoration ... from its extreme beauty, demands more than a passing notice. This is carried out on a scale we have never before seen in a Nonconformist church ... The architect ... furnished full-sized drawings for every bit of detail, and personally superintended the work." There were sky blue ceilings with white stars, bordered in vermilion and blue. The walls were painted stone-colour with lines indicating bricks with a flower in each. "Round all walls, cornices and surbases there is a running ornament in reddish-brown colour." The "large ornamental letters" to which some people objected, said: "He that hath an ear to hear, let him hear what the Spirit saith unto the churches;" "Glory to God in the highest, on Earth peace, good will towards men;" "Do this in remembrance of Me." Around the gallery front were seven beatitudes from the Sermon on the Mount. "The pillars of the arcade are decorated with a diaper pattern in chocolate and orange; the caps are picked out in green, blue, and crimson and gold, and the bases are relieved in similar colours. Surmounting them the arches are the most richly decorated portion of the church, having beautiful ornaments running round the face and soffits, and the spandrils are decorated in a similar manner. Although brilliant colours are used, they are blended with such skill that the effect is not at all gaudy, but rich and harmonious."

In 1985 the building was completely cleared and reordered inside. The original painting had been lost before that. The tower still contains one bell for the chiming of the clock, and the tower clock mechanism retains its original crank handle. (Note: For images of this building, please see Commons category:Christ Church, Ilkley)

=== Town Hall, Bolton, 1866–1873 ===
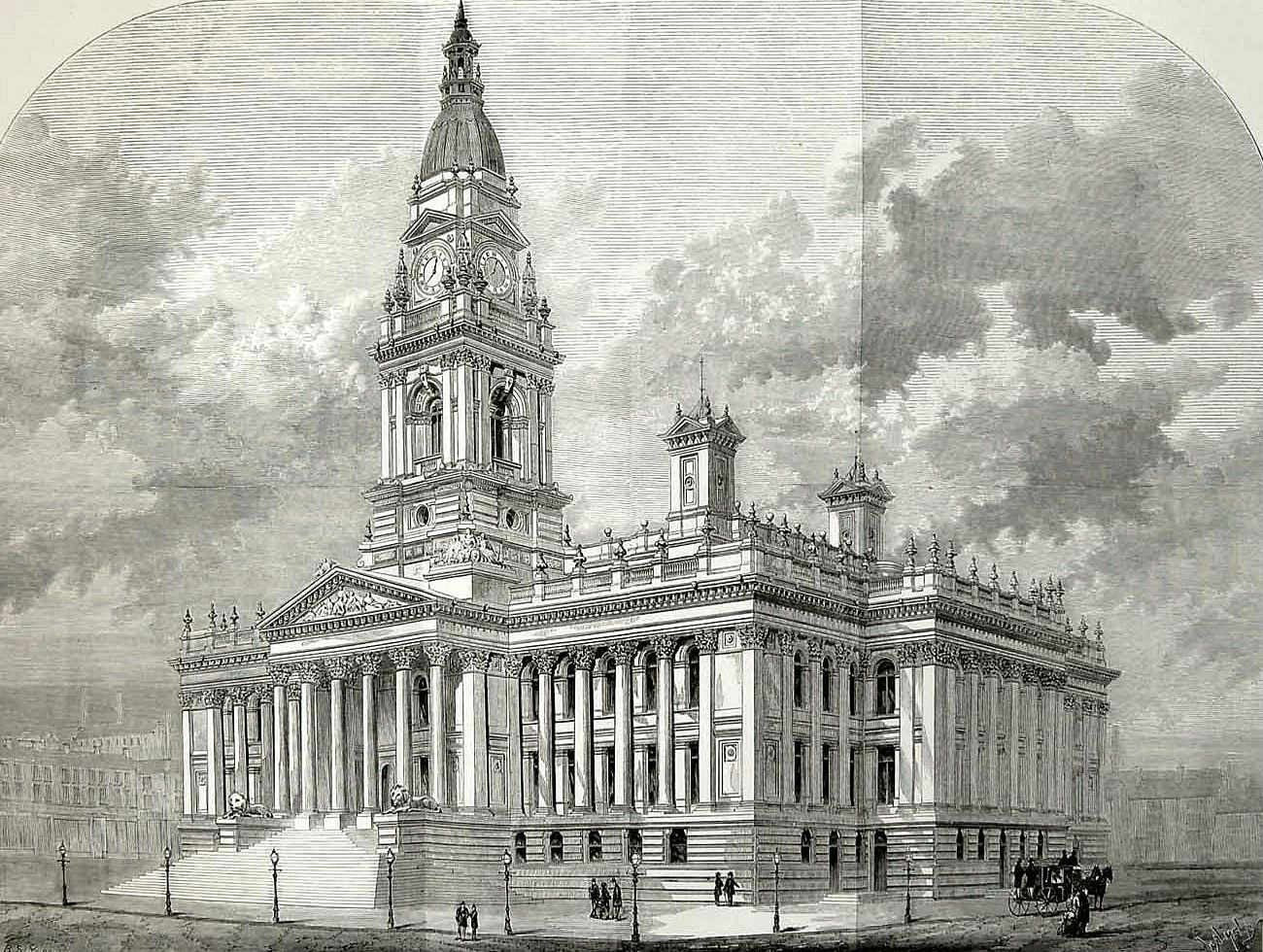
Bolton Town Hall in 1873

This is a Grade II* listed building by architects William Hill and his assistant George Woodhouse. It was opened on Thursday 5 June 1873, by the Prince and Princess of Wales. Burstall and Taylor were responsible for the main staircase and portico, the lions either side of the steps, and the general sculpture within and without the building. The figures on the pediment are by William Calder Marshall. The specifications for the provision of stone for carving were precise. The interior decoration is by W.B. Simpson.

In early January 1873 an animal of unknown genus escaped from the local menagerie, stole domestic animals from the town, and hid in the unfinished town hall. It was eventually captured by the landlord of the Eagle and Child public house, the town hall watchman and an English terrier bitch among the town hall rafters. It was subsequently chained up in a room at the pub for public entertainment. The central hall was damaged by fire in 1981 and was rebuilt. (Note: For images of this building, please see Commons category:Bolton Town Hall)

=== Sandal Parish Church, Sandal Magna, Wakefield, 1872–1873 ===
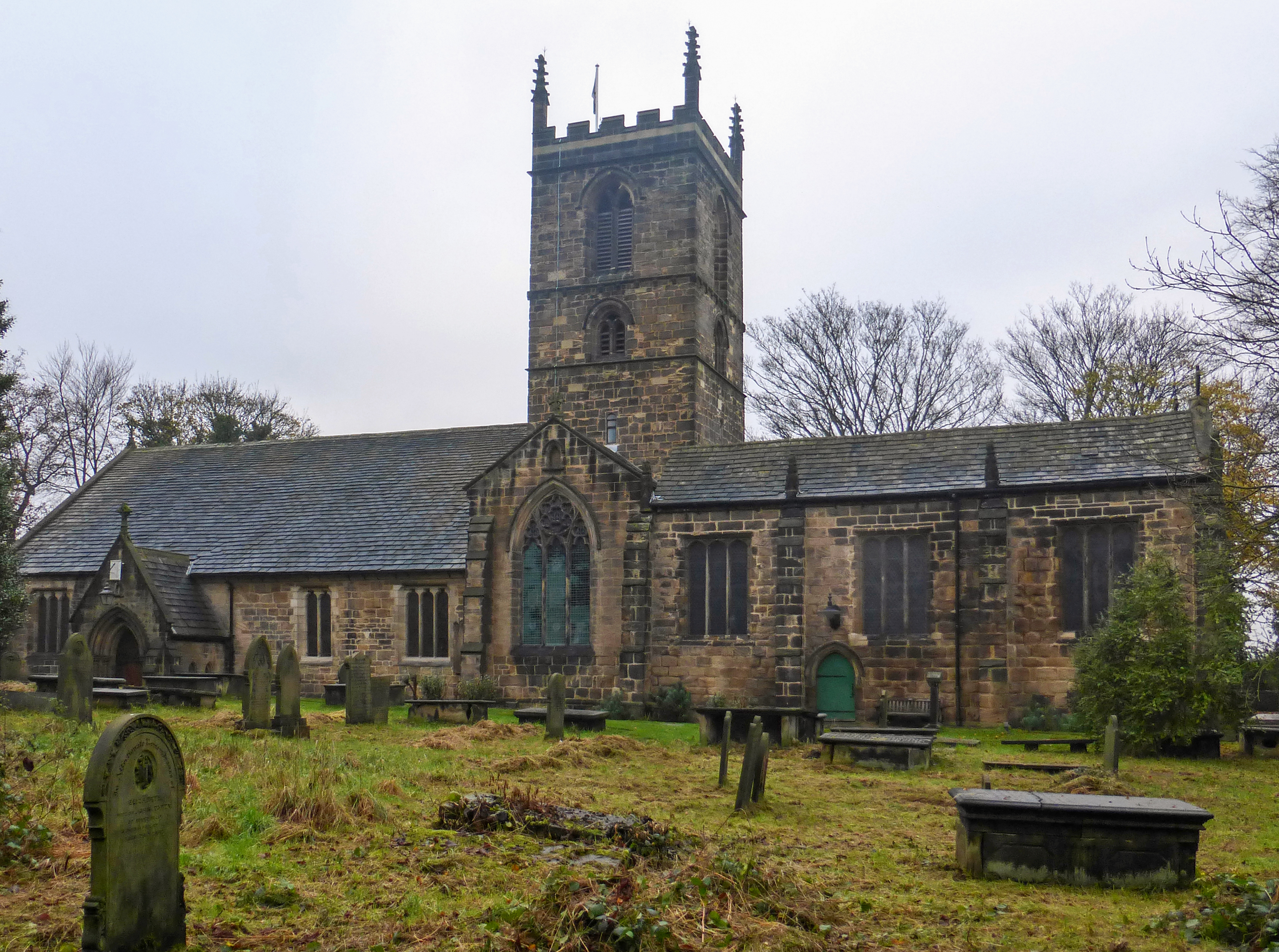
St Helen's Church, Sandal Magna

This is a Grade II* listed building containing 12th and 14th century masonry in the tower, and a 15th-century king post roof in the chancel. The nave roof is 19th century. It was renovated by architect Edward Habershon of London, closed for about a year from 1872, and reopened on Wednesday 24 September 1873. It was announced on that date that a carved stone pulpit had been ordered. The carvers of the pulpit are not named, but it was most likely by the same men who carved the reredos:

"The east end of the church, which before was a sad and painful sight, has been adorned by an exceedingly handsome reredos of Caen stone, after the design of one of the first artists in the country, and executed with much skill by Messrs. Burnstall & Taylor, of Leeds."

The church was lengthened by two or three bays in 1872, so that the west end was rebuilt. The south porch was replaced, and a three-light window was installed in place of the north door. The 1872 pulpit was removed in 1967. In 1970–1975 the Victorian south transept window was removed, and the west window was "simplified" by removing the decoration and leaving just the pictures. The font dates from 1669, after the Commonwealth. The church is open to visitors on Monday to Thursday mornings. (Note: For images of this building, please see Commons category:Saint Helen Church (Sandal Magna))

== Works by Benjamin Burstall ==
=== Group, 1875 ===
In 1875 Burstall exhibited a sculpture entitled Group at the Leeds Mechanics' Institution, at Leeds, in the Yorkshire Exhibition of Arts and Manufactures, of that year.

== See also ==
- Robert Mawer
- Catherine Mawer
- Charles Mawer
- Benjamin Payler
- Matthew Taylor (sculptor)
- Mawer and Ingle
- William Ingle
