= Benjamin Payler =

English sculptor

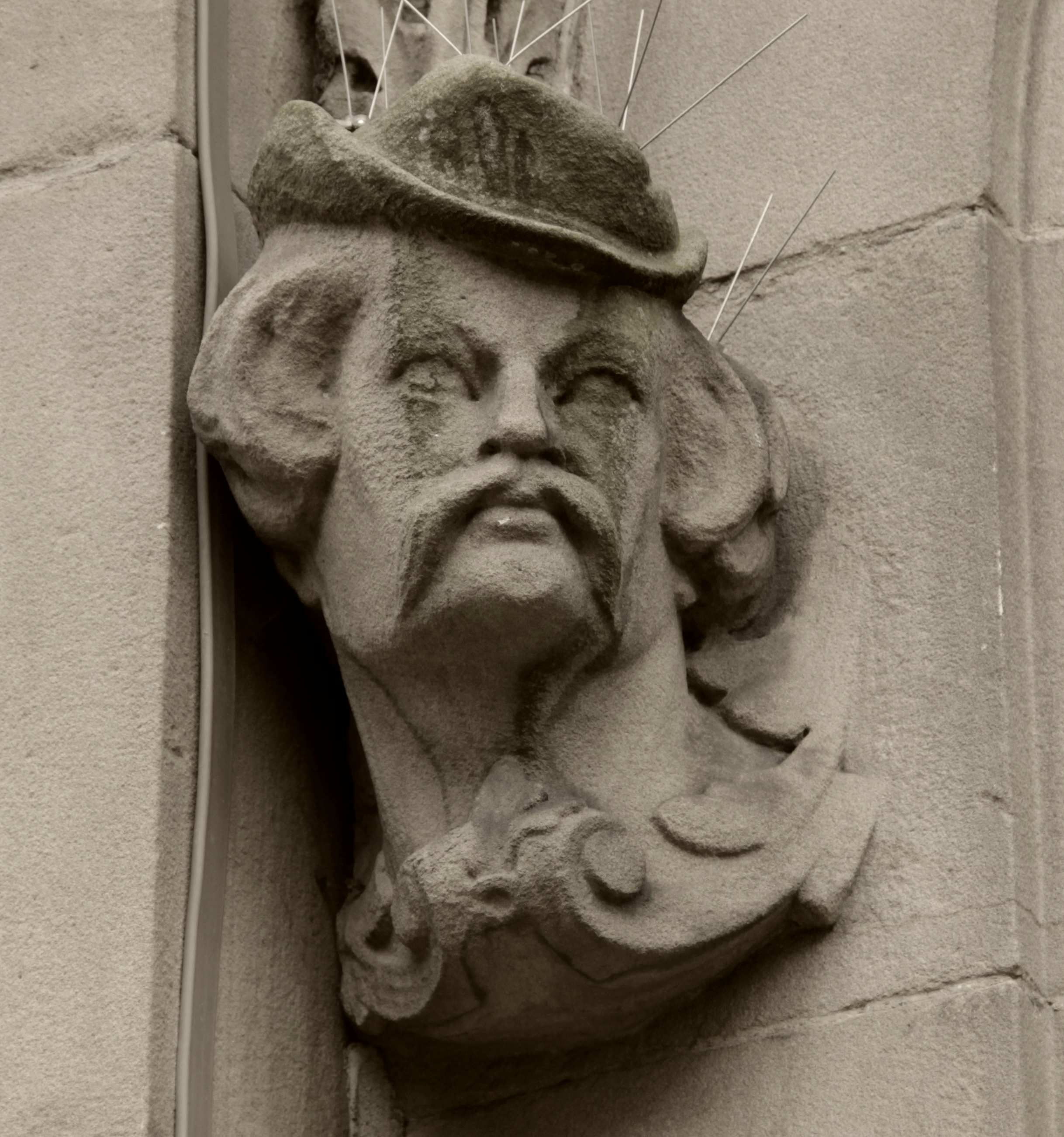
- Self-portrait of Benjamin Payler, 1874
- Born: 1841; Woodhouse, Leeds
- Died: 16 November 1907, aged approximately 66; Leeds
- Notable work: Bust of Henry Richardson, 1871; Architectural sculpture on: Queen's Hotel, Barnsley, 1874; School Board bldg, Leeds, 1881; Reredos, pulpit and font in: St Barnabas, Heaton, 1889
- Style: Neoclassical; Gothic Revival
- Movement: Aesthetic movement Romanticism
- Spouse: Mary Jane Lassey (1844–1919)

Benjamin Payler (Woodhouse, Leeds 1841 – Leeds 16 November 1907), (fl. 1871–1901), was a sculptor, stone and marble mason. He was apprenticed to Catherine Mawer, alongside fellow apprentices Matthew Taylor and Catherine's son Charles Mawer. He formed a business partnership at 50 Great George Street with Charles Mawer in 1881. There is no known record of Charles after that. Payler continued to run the business there under his own name. In his day, he was noted for his 1871 bust of Henry Richardson, the first Mayor of Barnsley, his keystone heads on the 1874 Queen's Hotel in the same town, and his architectural sculpture on George Corson's 1881 School Board offices, Leeds. Payler was a member of the Mawer Group, which included the above-mentioned sculptors, plus William Ingle.

== Early life ==
His father was James Payler (b.Woodhouse 18 May 1809), a wool cloth sorter; his mother was Hannah Payler nee Spurr (Hunslet 10 March 1808 – Leeds 1852), the fourth of numerous siblings, the surviving ones being Thomas Spurr, Edward T., Ann Elizabeth a milliner (1835–1911), John a brush maker, Emily, James, Mary, Lucy, and twins Henry Thomas and Frederick; all born at Woodhouse. The 1851 census finds Benjamin living at Woodhouse Street, Leeds, aged 9 years and a scholar, born at Woodhouse Leeds. In the 1861 census, he is at 29/30 Woodhouse Street, with his father, stepmother Margaret (b.1818) from Bishop Thornton and siblings. At age 19 he is already described as a sculptor.

== Apprenticeship ==
He was apprenticed to Catherine Mawer alongside Matthew Taylor, the "gifted sculptor" of the angler's tomb in Woodhouse Cemetery. Assuming that he completed his apprenticeship at age 21, he could have been a top sculptor from 1862; it is not known whether he continued employment with Catherine Mawer until 1871 when he began independent work.

== Family and career ==
Benjamin married Mary Jane Lassey (1844–1919) daughter of cabinet maker Joseph Lassey, in the Brunswick Methodist Chapel, Leeds, on 27 August 1870. They had at least six children: Benjamin (1875–1875), Frank Lassey (1876–1963) a bank clerk, Margaret Louise (b.1877; m.1912), Sydney (1878–1886), James Stanley (1880 – 24 January 1883) and Henry Rowland (1881 – 7 March 1885). The 1871 census sees Benjamin, a sculptor and stone carver, and his wife living at 5 Woodville Terrace. In 1871 he was already advertising his services and working from his 5 Woodville Terrace address. In 1881 they and their children Frank, Sydney and James, and a domestic servant, were living at 19 Kingsham Road, Leeds; he is described as a sculptor mason, employing four men. In 1885 they were living at 19 Bagby Street, Bagby Fields, Leeds. The 1891 census finds him at 14 Archery Place, Leeds under the name Taylor, with his wife and children. In the 1901 census Benjamin, his wife and their children Frank and Margaret, are at 7 Blandford Gardens, Leeds; Benjamin is described as a sculptor.

== Death ==
When he died in 1907, his effects were worth £987 2s 3d, and he left them to his widow Mary Jane Payler, and his two children Frank Lassey Payler bank clerk, and Margaret Louisa Payler spinster.

== Works by Benjamin Payler ==
=== Bust of Henry Richardson JP, 1871 ===
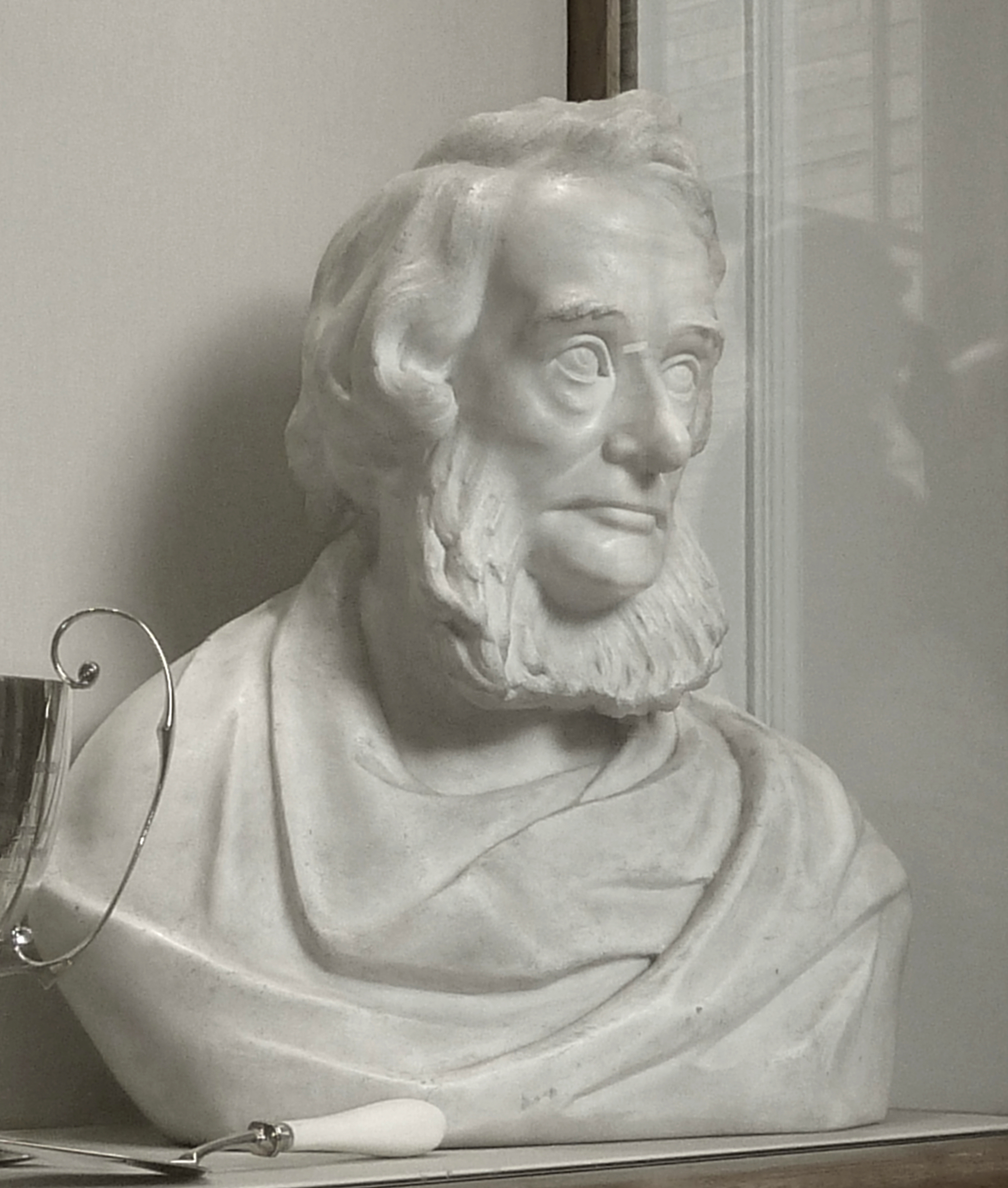
Bust of Henry Richardson

Henry Richardson (1798 – Dodworth Grove Barnsley 1 January 1875) was elected first mayor of Barnsley in 1869 and took his seat on 13 September. He was a West Riding of Yorkshire magistrate, and the head of Richardson, Lee, Rycroft & Co., Manchester and Barnsley linen manufacturers. His Leeds Mercury obituary described him as "a gentleman who was highly esteemed for his many amiable qualities and unostentatious benevolence."

The bust was presented to Richardson at Barnsley Corn Exchange, (Note: The Corn Exchange burned down in 1927, and as of 2017 the bust has not been found. For purposes of identification, Richardson's head is sculpted on the facade of the Old Queens Hotel, Barnsley, and there is possibly a portrait of him in the Town Hall council chamber. The Town Hall building was as of 2017 occupied by Barnsley Museum.) by his linen factory employees, in token of their esteem, and in recognition of his golden wedding anniversary earlier the same year. The Yorkshire Post described it thus: "A handsome marble bust of himself, which had been executed by Mr Benjamin Payler, of Leeds, a young and rising artist. The bust was placed on a pedestal of polished granite."

In 1871, the Barnsley Chronicle reported:

"The bust, which is of beautiful white marble, has been executed by Mr Benjamin Payler, of Leeds, a young artist of considerable promise, who bids fair, at no distant date, to distinguish himself as a sculptor. He is, we may state in passing, the same artist who executed the sculptures on the Queen's Hotel, bottom of Regent Street, which comprise admirable likenesses of the Mayor and Mr Richardson. The bust, which represents the head about the life size, is true to nature in its representation of the original. From whatever standpoint it may be viewed, the likeness is a perfect one, not merely the expression of the countenance, but almost every line in the features being traced with a striking fidelity to nature. The base bears the following inscription: Presented to Henry Richardson Esq., J.P., by his workpeople 1871. The pedestal, which represents the lower half of a Corinthian column, has been supplied by Mr Oxley of this town, and is formed of polished granite, the base being of white, or Aberdeen granite, and the stalk of red Peterhead granite. The height of the pedestal is about 3 feet 6 inches, and the circumference of the stalk 30 inches. As will be seen from the subjoined address it is the wish of the workpeople that when Barnsley becomes possessed of a Town Hall ... the bust should be offered to the Corporation, to be placed by them, if accepted, in some conspicuous part of the building, to remain [as a memorial of his integrity, good works and generosity. After thanking them, Richardson commented that the bust was] beautiful - it was perfect. [Looking at the bust which was] so life-like, [he added that,] there it was in marble, symbolical of the future, when that tongue which now spoke to them would speak no more. [His son Mr G.M. Richardson said that,] he really felt as if he was on the point of breaking down when that bust of his father was unveiled, the likeness was so very striking. [Mr H.M. Richardson added that,] the bust had his most unqualified approval, and expressed his conviction that Mr. Payler had a distinguished future before him as a sculptor." (Barnsley Chronicle 2 December 1871)

As of 2017 the bust was on display in a glass case in Barnsley Town Hall, and its pedestal was in the Cannon Hall Museum.

Media related to Bust of Henry Richardson by Payler at Wikimedia Commons

=== Queen's Hotel, Barnsley, 1874 ===
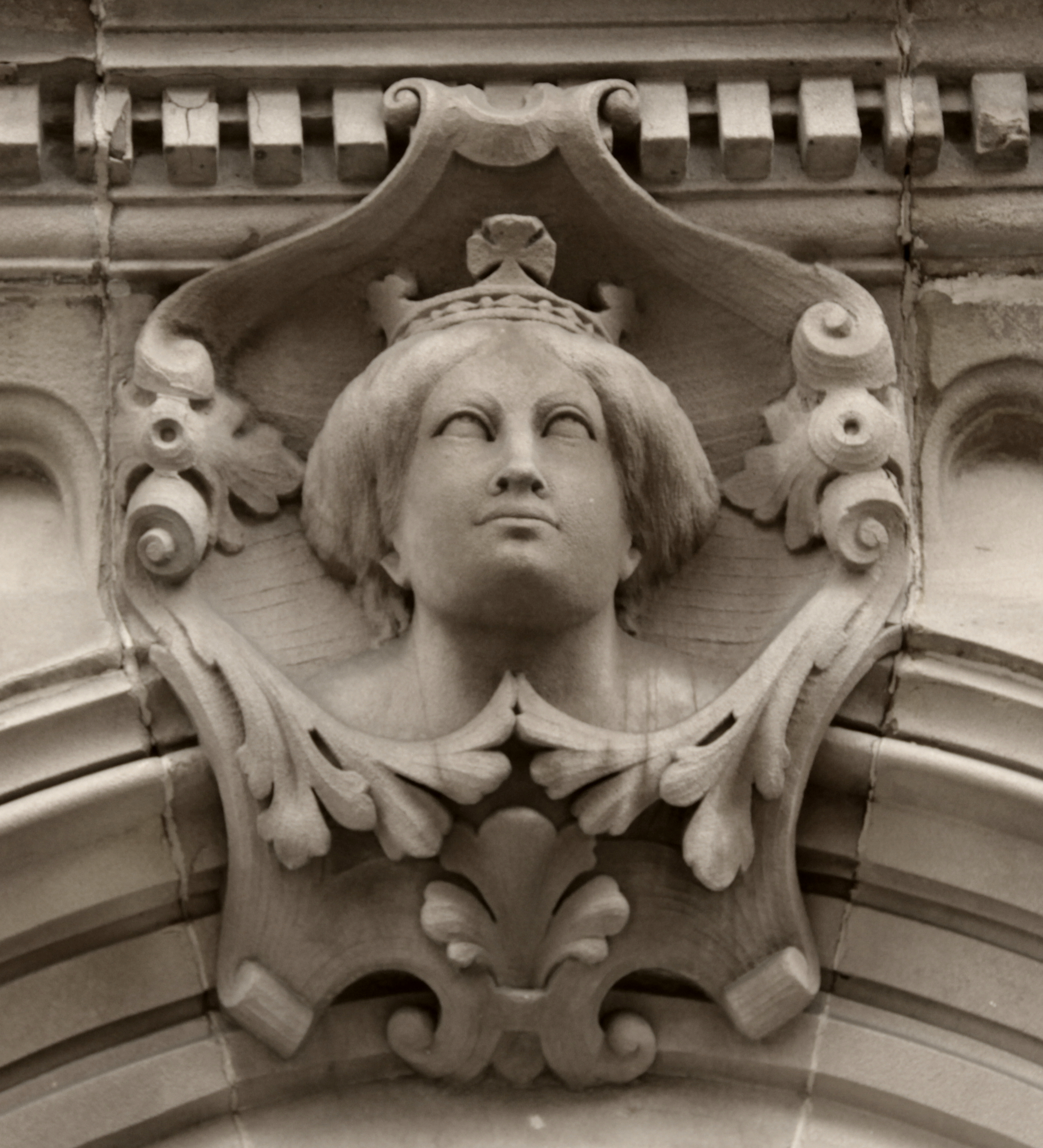
Queen Victoria by Payler, on former Queen's Hotel

The Queens Hotel (later Queen's Court) is a Grade II listed building in Regent Street and Eldon Street, Barnsley, South Yorkshire. It was designed by Wade & Turner and completed in 1874. Payler created the sculpted heads on the building, including portraits of Queen Victoria, and Henry Richardson, first Mayor of Barnsley. He also created the triplicate label stop heads of himself, Catherine Mawer and Old Father Time on the adjacent building. The Historic England listing description includes:

"Symmetrical facade to Regent Street: central bay and each end marked by pilasters with acanthus capitals. Central round-arched enriched portal with double, panelled door and consoles supporting heavy dentilled cornice. Carved head of Queen Victoria as keystone. C20 canopy. Round-arched ground-floor sash windows with carved-head keystones and pointed hoodmoulds. 1st-floor sash windows on decorative sill band all square-headed, the central one enriched with garlanded lions-head consoles supporting segmental pediment, with balustrade with urns."

- Media related to Former Queen's Hotel, Barnsley at Wikimedia Commons
- Media related to Carved heads on building adjacent to former Queens Hotel Barnsley at Wikimedia Commons

=== Stage boxes in Grand Theatre, Leeds, 1877–1878 ===
The Grand Theatre in Upper Briggate, Leeds, is a Grade II* listed building, designed by George Corson and his chief assistant James Robinson Watson, and opened in November 1878, having taken "thirteen months to build." It originally consisted of a theatre and assembly rooms, with shops in between. The interiors have been much changed, especially in the 1930s. Payler executed the decoration on the stage boxes. "The prevailing colour of the decorations (was) crimson and gold."

Media related to Grand Theatre, Leeds at Wikimedia Commons

=== Cornice and medallion heads, Thornton's Arcade, 1877–1878 ===
Although no evidence of the authorship of this exterior stone carving has been found, it is likely that Payler carved the stone medallion portrait heads at either end of Thornton's Arcade, in the city centre of Leeds, West Yorkshire. The reasons for considering Payler's possible authorship are as follows. The carvings are not in the same theatrical style as John Wormald Appleyard's nearby wooden clock figures, or his wooden head of the Duchess of Devonshire, inside the arcade. The stone heads resemble Payler's previous work on the former Queen's Hotel, Barnsley, described above. The carvings include a portrait of Payler as a signature, and a portrait of Appleyard with a feather in his cap as an acknowledgement of achievement given from one sculptor to another by members of the Mawer Group. Payler and Appleyard ran stoneyards about fifty yards apart, in Great George Street and Cookridge Street. They sometimes worked side by side on the same building, for example in Leeds Grand Theatre, and Leeds Central Library.

The exterior at the Briggate end has a carved cornice and four male heads on the second floor. The Lands Lane entrance has two male heads over the arch. The arcade underwent restoration in 1993 and 2010.

- Media related to Thornton's Arcade stone head sculptures at Wikimedia Commons
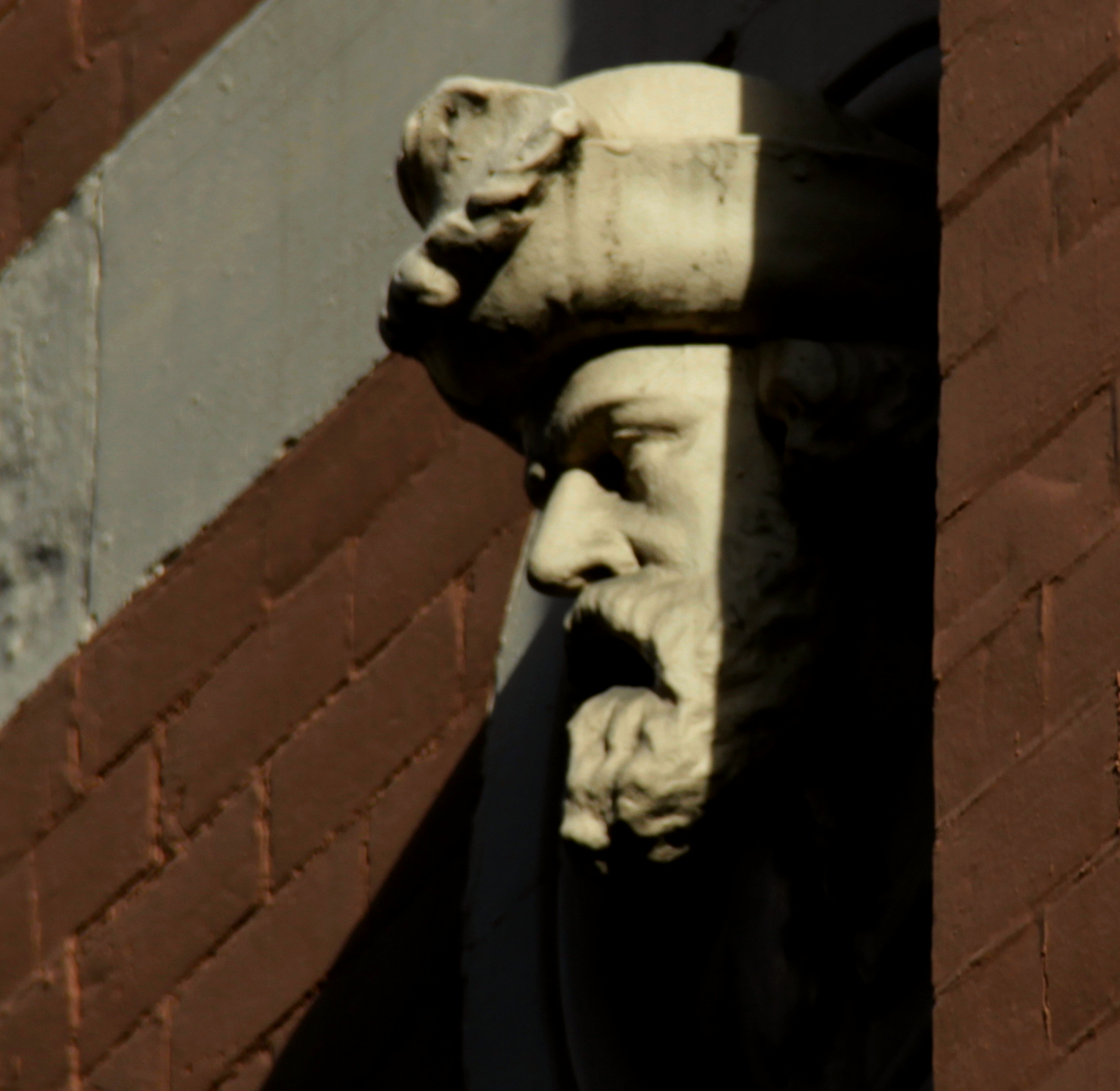
Lands Lane medallion head, 1878

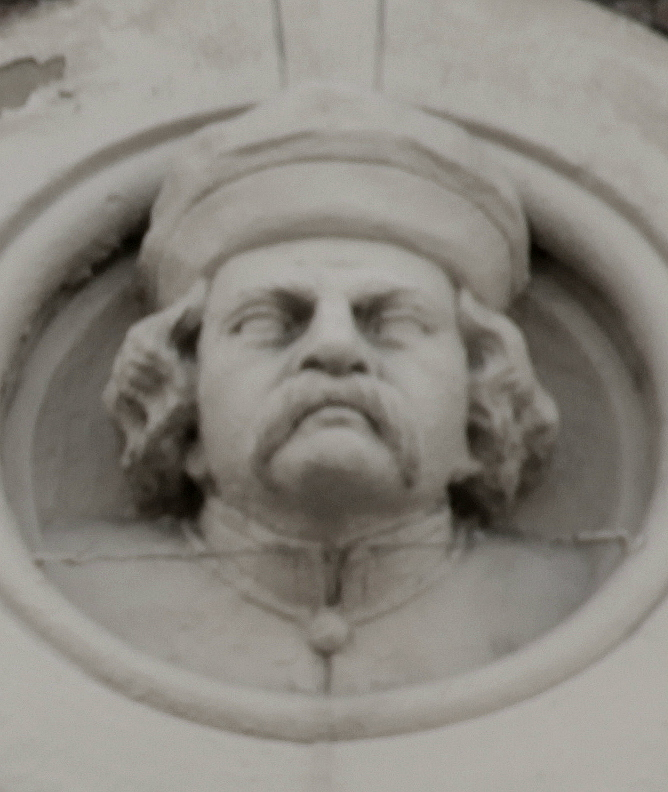
Briggate Portrait of Benjamin Payler, 1878 (Note: The inclusion of a portrait of stone carver Benjamin Payler implies that Payler contributed something to the stone carving work on this structure, although it was Appleyard who was credited for the wooden clock figures in the newspapers)

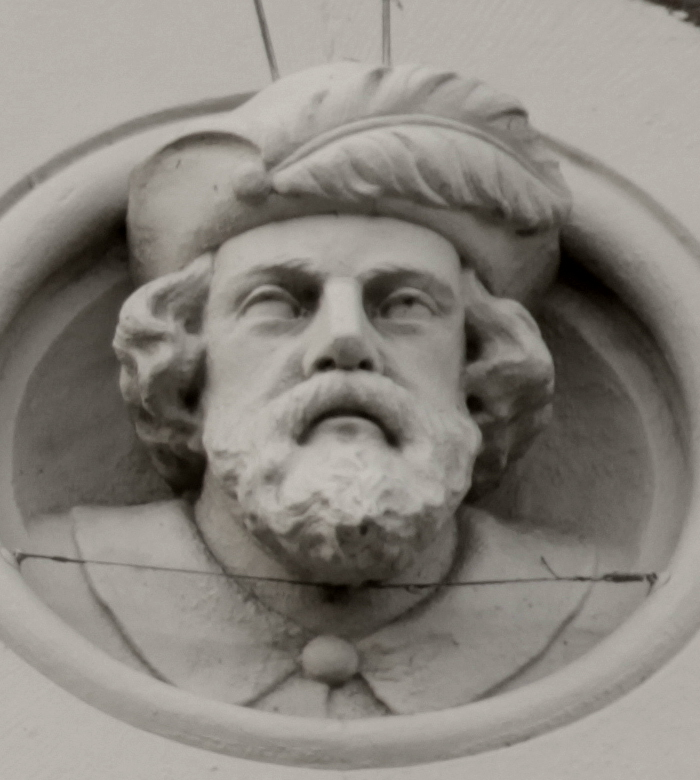
Portrait of J.W. Appleyard with a feather in his cap

=== Leeds School Board Offices, 1878/1879–1881 ===
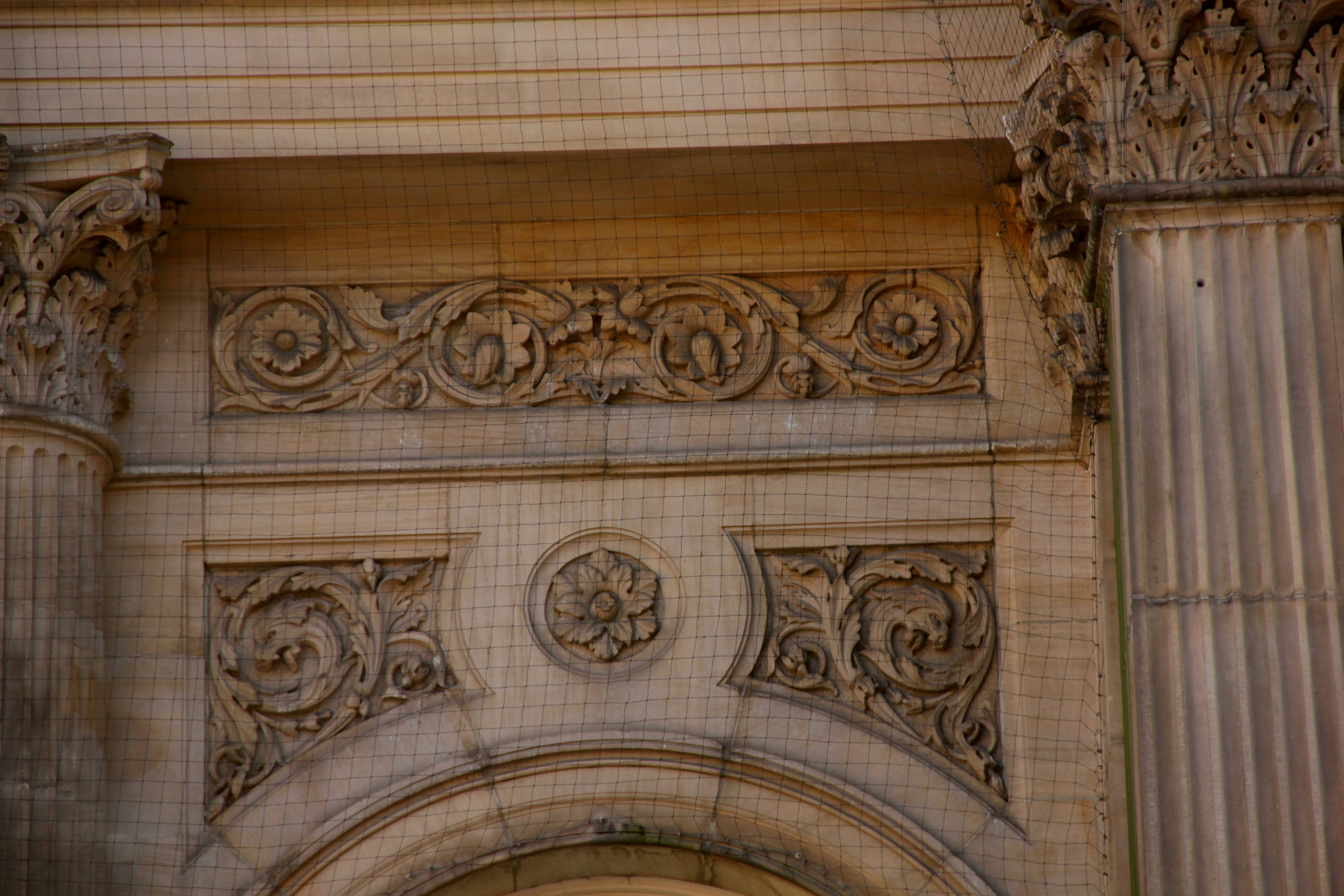
Dragon's heads are hidden in this sculpture

The former Leeds School Board building, in Calverley Street, Leeds, West Yorkshire, is a Grade II* listed building, designed by George Corson. The Yorkshire Post credited "Mr. B. Payler" for the carving. The original estimate for the building was £24,000, and it was designed as a free interpretation of the Palladian style. It was opened on Thursday 29 September 1881. The Leeds Mercury said that:

"Carving has been judiciously, though not lavishly, applied in adornment, and this front, with its fluted pillars and pilasters, its Corinthian capitals and beautiful detail work, its cornices and balustrading and its lofty pavilion, is harmonious in design and treatment, and pleasant to the eye ... The windows on the ground floor are lofty and round-headed, the spandrils enriched with carving, and over each window are carved panels ... The basement is rusticated, and is built with stone from Burley in Wharfedale, the superstructure being Pool Bank stone ... Entering by the principal doorway in Calverley Street, it will be noticed that in the jambs of the archway are carved full-length figures, emblematical of the School Board work. They represent a boy and girl on their way to school. They have been carefully executed, and reflects credit on the sculptor, Mr. Matthew Taylor, of Leeds ... Mr. Benjamin Payler, stone carving."(Leeds Mercury 29 September 1881)

Media related to Leeds School Board building at Wikimedia Commons

=== Leeds Municipal Buildings (now Leeds Central Library) 1879–1884 ===
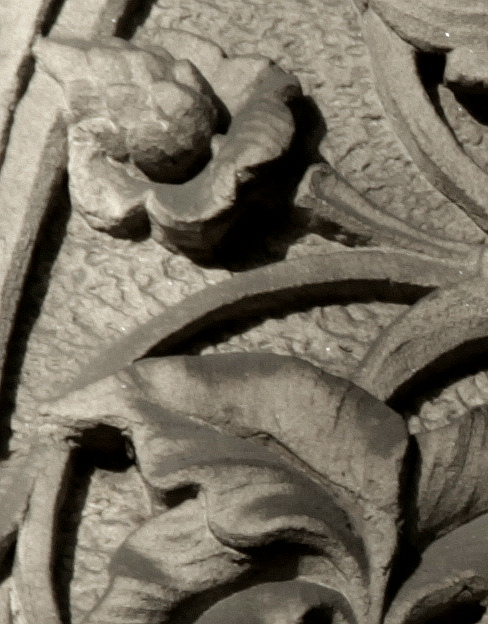
Carving on Leeds Central Library

Leeds Central Library is a Grade II* listed building, designed by George Corson and opened on 16 April 1884. The exterior carving was executed by Matthew Taylor and Benjamin Payler.

Media related to Leeds Central Library, exterior carvings at Wikimedia Commons

=== St Lawrence's Church, Pudsey, restoration, 1887–1888 ===
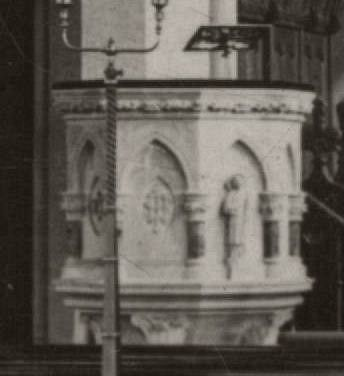
Payler's pulpit in St Lawrence Pudsey, in 1911

St Lawrence's on Church Lane, the parish church of Pudsey, West Yorkshire is a Grade II listed building. It was designed by Thomas Taylor and built in 1821–1823. The restoration of 1887–1888 included the pulpit by Payler, and that was dedicated on Sunday 16 September 1888. In 1888 the Leeds Mercury described the pulpit thus:

"The work of constructing it was intrusted to Mr Benjamin Payler, sculptor, Great George Street, Leeds, who adopted the Early English style of architecture for his design. The base of the pulpit is of Caen stone, and is surmounted by panels with richly moulded and carved cornices, the panels being divided by six green Serpentine marble columns. The centre panel under the book rest contains a figure of St. Lawrence, the patron saint of the church, in bold relief, which stands upon the floor of the pulpit, and is supported by three red stone (Dumfries) shafts, the whole forming an imposing piece of ecclesiastical architecture." (Leeds Mercury 17 September 1888)

The "Caen-stone octagonal pulpit with shafted marble columns" is described in the listing, but all internal furnishings were removed from the nave during the 2002 reordering.

Media related to St Lawrence & St Paul, Pudsey at Wikimedia Commons

=== St Barnabas, Heaton, restoration, 1889 ===
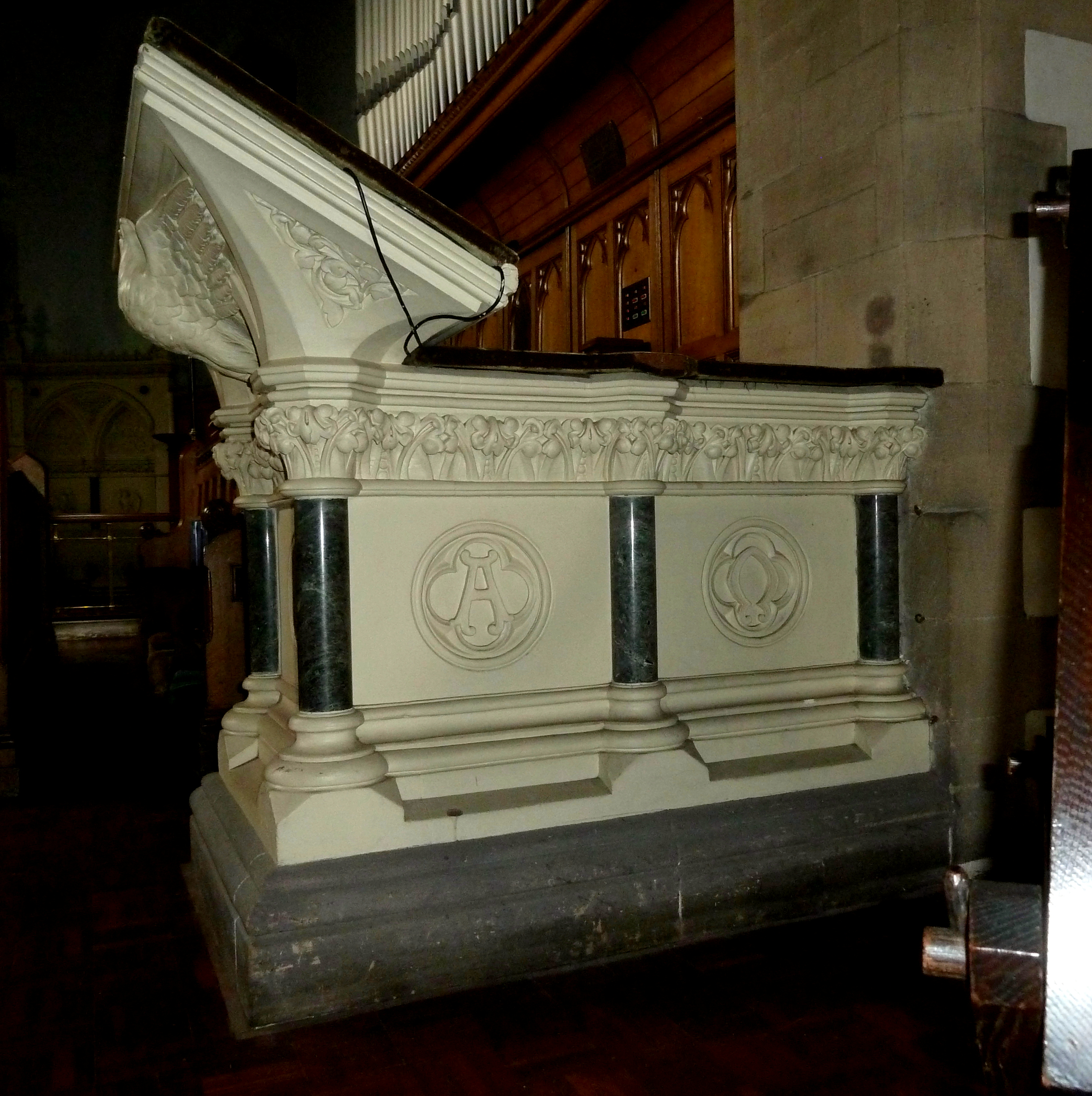
Reading desk at St Barnabas

St Barnabas at Ashwell Road, Heaton, West Yorkshire, is an unlisted building. It was designed by Mallinson & Healey, and built 1863–1864. The reredos, a "handsome reading desk of Caen stone, with pillars, of dark green marble," and pulpit in Caen stone were added in 1889 by Payler. The reredos cost £120. English Church Architecture describes them as follows:

"The reredos, reading desk and pulpit form a matching set of furnishings added in 1889 to the designs of Benjamin Payler of Leeds. They are made of white stone with coloured marble shafts at the sides or angles and are covered over much of their surfaces with diapering or small repeating flowers."

Media related to Church of St Barnabas, Heaton at Wikimedia Commons

=== Former London and Yorkshire Bank, Barnsley, 1892 ===
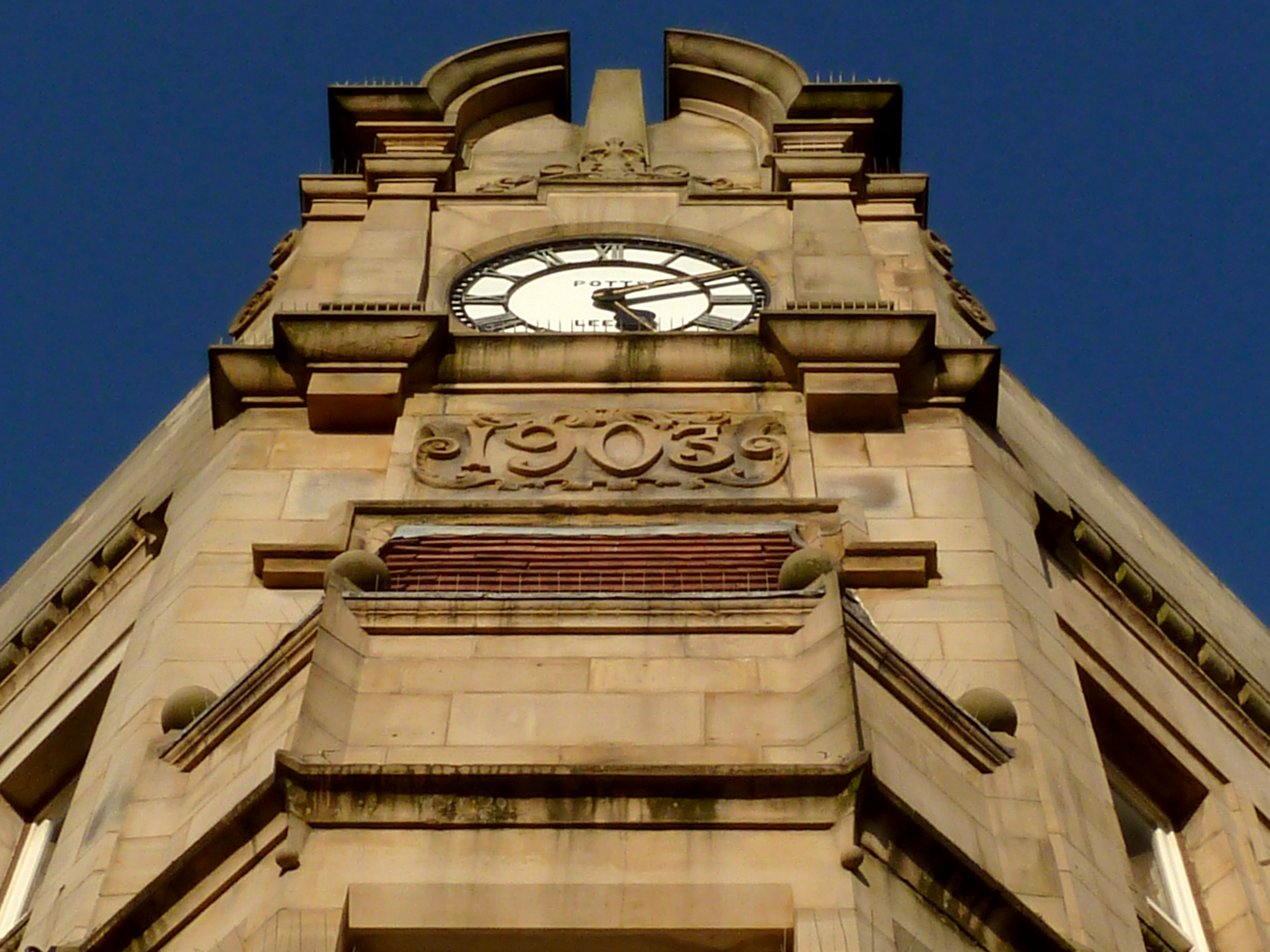
Former L & Y Bank. After its 1903 rebuild; probably nothing of Payler's work remains

The former London and Yorkshire Bank, Church Street, Barnsley, South Yorkshire, was altered in 1892 by architects Wade & Turner. Payler was entrusted with some carved work for the doorway. The carved stones arrived at Barnsley on Friday 29 October 1892. However, due to a mason's strike, Payler had to send two or three men from Leeds to fix the stones in place. They completed the work "slowly" because they could not be assisted by Barnsley men.

Media related to Former London and Yorkshire Bank, Barnsley at Wikimedia Commons

== See also ==
- Robert Mawer
- Catherine Mawer
- Charles Mawer
- Matthew Taylor (sculptor)
- Benjamin Burstall
- Mawer and Ingle
- William Ingle
