= Mawer =

Mawer has sometimes been described as a British occupational surname related to another British surname "Mower". However, there is no reliable citation or clear origin for this. One argument against a speculated connection with the name "Mower" is that in the days when clerks (amanuenses) wrote what they heard from the illiterate public, they differentiated between Mawer and Mower, i.e. they were probably pronounced differently, even in areas where the same dialect was spoken.

Another possibility worth researching is that "Mawer" is an Anglicised spelling of Mauer, a fairly common German surname, meaning "wall". If that were indeed the origin of "Mawer", it would explain both the differentiated pronunciation, and the Anglicised spelling.

The surname Mawer may refer to:

- Allen Mawer (1879–1942), English philologist
- Barbara Mawer (1936–2006), British scientist
- Catherine Mawer (1803–1877), British architectural sculptor
- Charles Mawer (1839–1903), British architectural sculptor
- Gary Mawer (born 1969), Irish sprint canoer
- June Knox-Mawer (1930–2006), British writer
- Philip Mawer (born 1947), British civil servant
- Robert Mawer (1807–1854), British architectural sculptor
- Shaun Mawer (1959–2010), British football player
- Simon Mawer (1948–2025), British author

== See also ==
- Mawer, Saskatchewan
- Maver or Mavor, a Scottish surname.
- Mawer language, spoken in south-west Chad
- Mawer Group: a group of closely associated 19th-century architectural sculptors working in Leeds, West Yorkshire, England. These were: Robert Mawer, Catherine Mawer, Charles Mawer, William Ingle, Matthew Taylor, Benjamin Payler and Benjamin Burstall.
