= Maver =

Maver or Mavers is an occupational surname of Scottish origin, which means a steward, from the Gaelic "maor". It may refer to:

- Abby Mavers (born 1989), British actress
- Lee Mavers (born 1962), British musician
- Marie Mävers (born 1991), German field hockey player
- Rob Maver (born 1986), Canadian football player

== See also ==
- Darko Maver, fictional character created by Eva and Franco Mattes
- Mawer
