= Catherine Mawer =

British architectural sculptor (1803–1877)

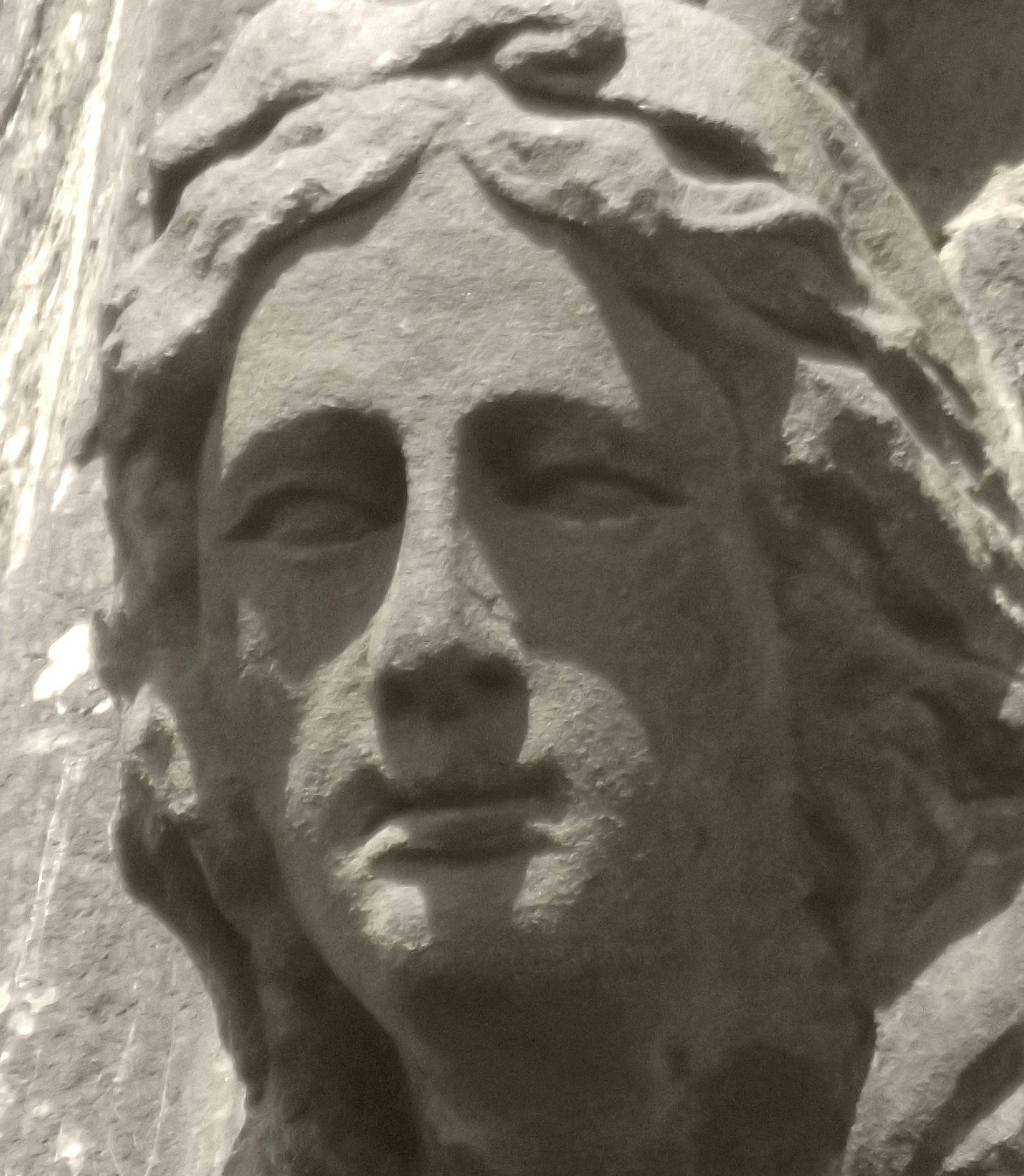
- Self-portrait of Catherine Mawer aged about 53 years
- Born: 1803; Bilton, Harrogate
- Died: 11 April 1877 (aged 73–74); 7 Oxford Place, Leeds
- Resting place: Former St Mark's churchyard, Woodhouse, Leeds
- Notable work: Mawer memorial, 1854; Architectural sculpture at: St Mark's, Low Moor, 1857; Mechanics Institution, Halifax, 1857; Holy Innocents, Dewsbury, 1858; Leeds Town Hall, 1858; Font at: St Peter, Barton, 1859
- Style: Gothic Revival; Neoclassical
- Movement: Aesthetic movement Romanticism; Gothic Revival; Neoclassicism
- Spouse: Robert Mawer
- Memorials: Mawer memorial

Catherine Mawer (1803 - 11 April 1877) was an architectural sculptor who worked alongside her husband Robert Mawer, then following his death in 1854 she ran the family stone yard as a master sculptor at Great George Street, Leeds, West Yorkshire, England, until 1859. The other master sculptor in her 1854–1859 company, which was known as Mrs Mawer, was her nephew William Ingle who supervised the stone yard and onsite works from 1854. Her apprentices were Matthew Taylor, Benjamin Payler, and her son Charles Mawer. All the apprentices later had independent careers as sculptors. After her son came of age in 1870, she continued working alongside Charles and her nephew William in the partnership Mawer and Ingle at the same address. Catherine was a founder member of the Mawer Group, which comprised all of the above Leeds architectural sculptors. During her lifetime, the Mawer group produced some strongly lifelike and often unflattering portraits, full of movement, including portraits of men with overhanging moustaches and cavernous mouths. These portraits continued after the deaths of Robert Mawer and William Ingle, but stopped appearing at her death in 1877. It is therefore reasonable to conclude that this style of work was her own.

== Personal life ==
Catherine Mawer's father was Anthony Scriven, alehouse keeper, and her mother was Elizabeth Scriven (1767 – 2 December 1841). Catherine was born in Bilton, Harrogate in 1803, and baptised in Knaresborough on 27 February 1804. She had a sister Mary Ann Scriven (d. Tadcaster 15 March 1861). Catherine married Robert Mawer at Ripley, West Riding of Yorkshire on 15 May 1837. She was the mother of Charles Mawer, who was present at her death.

Catherine died on 11 April 1877 aged 74, at 7 Oxford Place, Leeds, of old age, having had bronchitis for five days. She was buried on 14 April 1877 with Robert in the churchyard of St Mark, Woodhouse, Leeds. At her death she left effects worth less than £1,500.

== Career ==
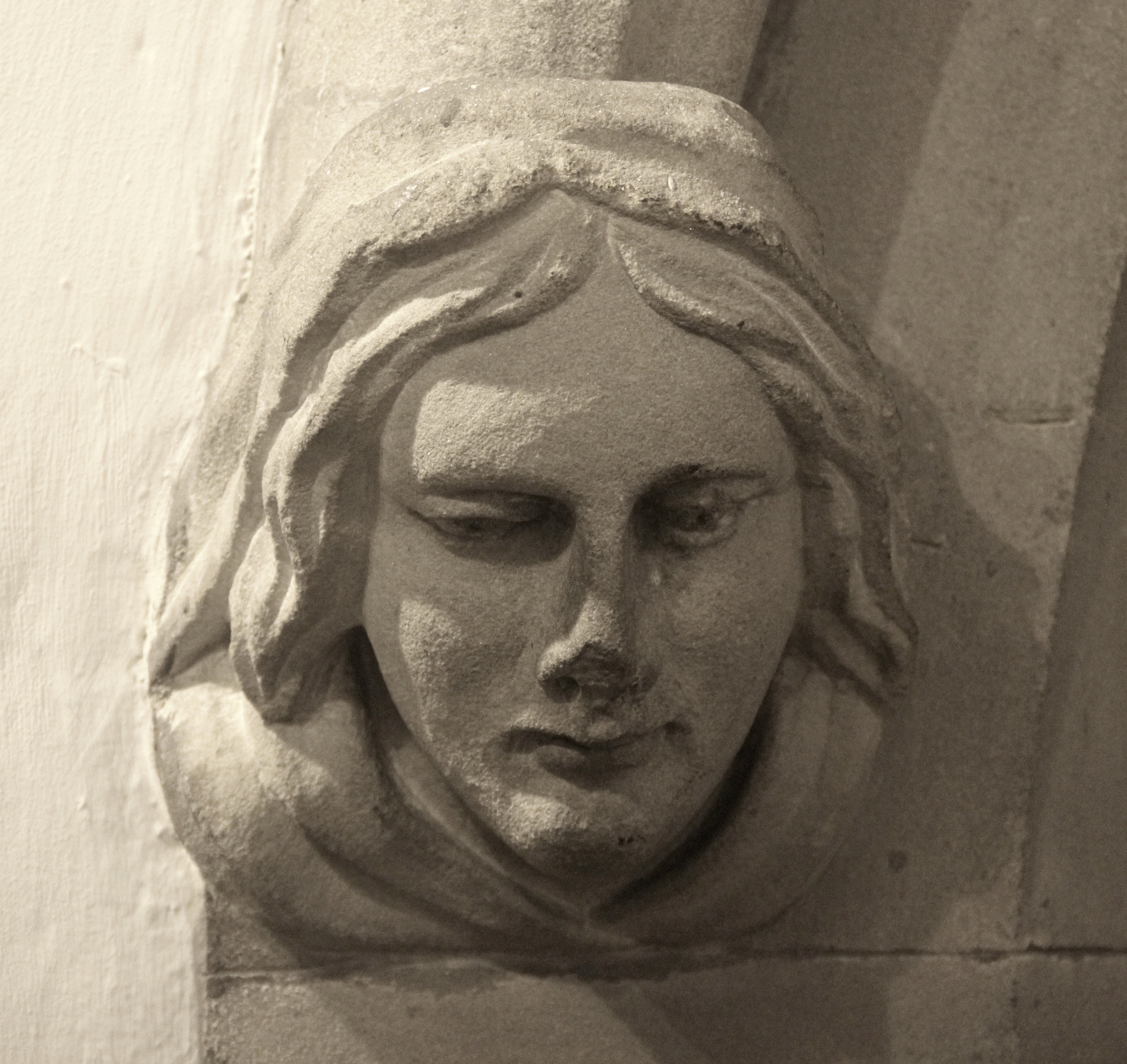
Portrait of Catherine (ca.1851) by Robert Mawer

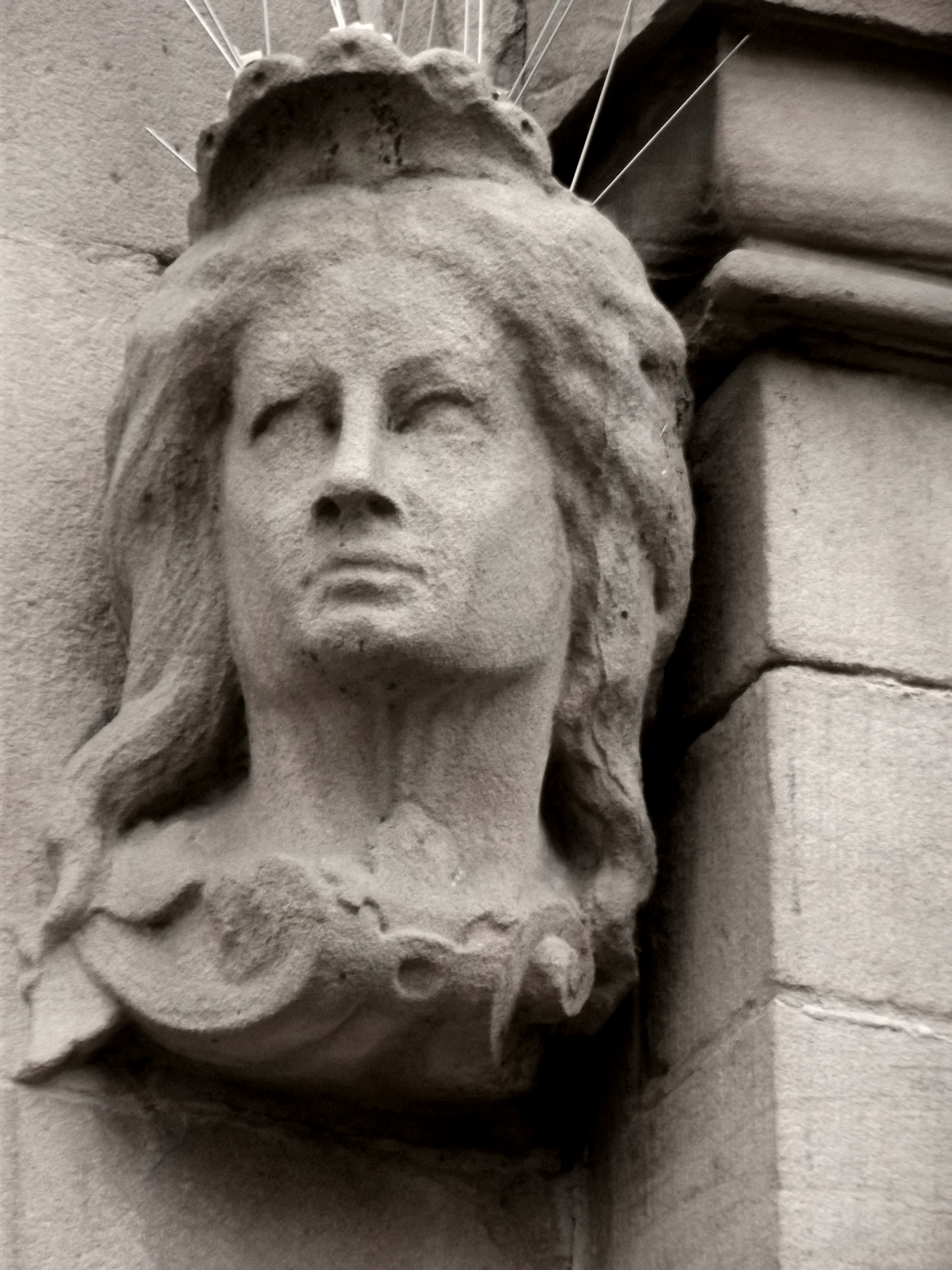
Retrospective portrait of Catherine (ca.1873) by Benjamin Payler

She worked as a top sculptor alongside her husband Robert Mawer. She was a partner in Mawer & Ingle, but she does not describe herself as a stone carver in the 1861 and 1871 Censuses, although her son does so. She is credited by the Leeds Intelligencer for her Caen stone carving in 1857, however, and by other newspapers for other work between 1854 and 1859, listed below. In 1856 she summonsed an apprentice to court for disobeying orders, but her case was dismissed. The apprentice was Matthew Taylor, who was "exceedingly clever at his business." The case sheds some light on the conditions of work for apprentices at the stone carving works:

"On Saturday (19 February 1856), at the Leeds Court House, Mrs Mawer, widew of the late Mr Mawer, stone-mason, near the new Town-hall, summoned one of her apprentices to show cause why he did not obey her lawful command to go into the country to work. Mr. Horsfall appeared for Mrs Mawer, and Mr. Ferns for the apprentice. The case was brought into Court for the purpose of deciding the legality of the apprentice's claim for 2s. (equivalent to £9.68 in 2016) a week for expenses when from home performing his employer's work. It appeared that Mrs Mawer paid him 8s. (equivalent to £38.72 in 2016) per week, and by reason of his proficiency in his business he was frequently sent into the country to carve stone in churches and churchyards, and on such occasions his railway fare was paid, and 6d. (equivalent to £2.42 in 2016) per night allowed for lodgings. Mr. Horsfall called several master stone-masons, who proved that the custom of the trade was to allow 6d. per night only when apprentices or journeymen were sent into the country to work. Mrs Mawer had, however, made occasional presents to the apprentice; but he now claimed 2s. per week for expenses. Mr J. Hope Shaw decided that, although the apprentice's indenture compelled him to obey all the lawful commands of his employer, yet, if the means were withheld whereby he could perform such command, he could not be punished for refusal. It was the same when a witness was subpoened; if a reasonable sum were not tendered to him for expenses, he could not be punished if he failed to obey the command. The sum of 2s. per week for expenses when an apprentice was away from home, the Bench considered a reasonable sum; and that not having been paid, they were of opinion that it was not a disobedience requiring punishment. The summons was therefore dismissed."

== Recognition ==
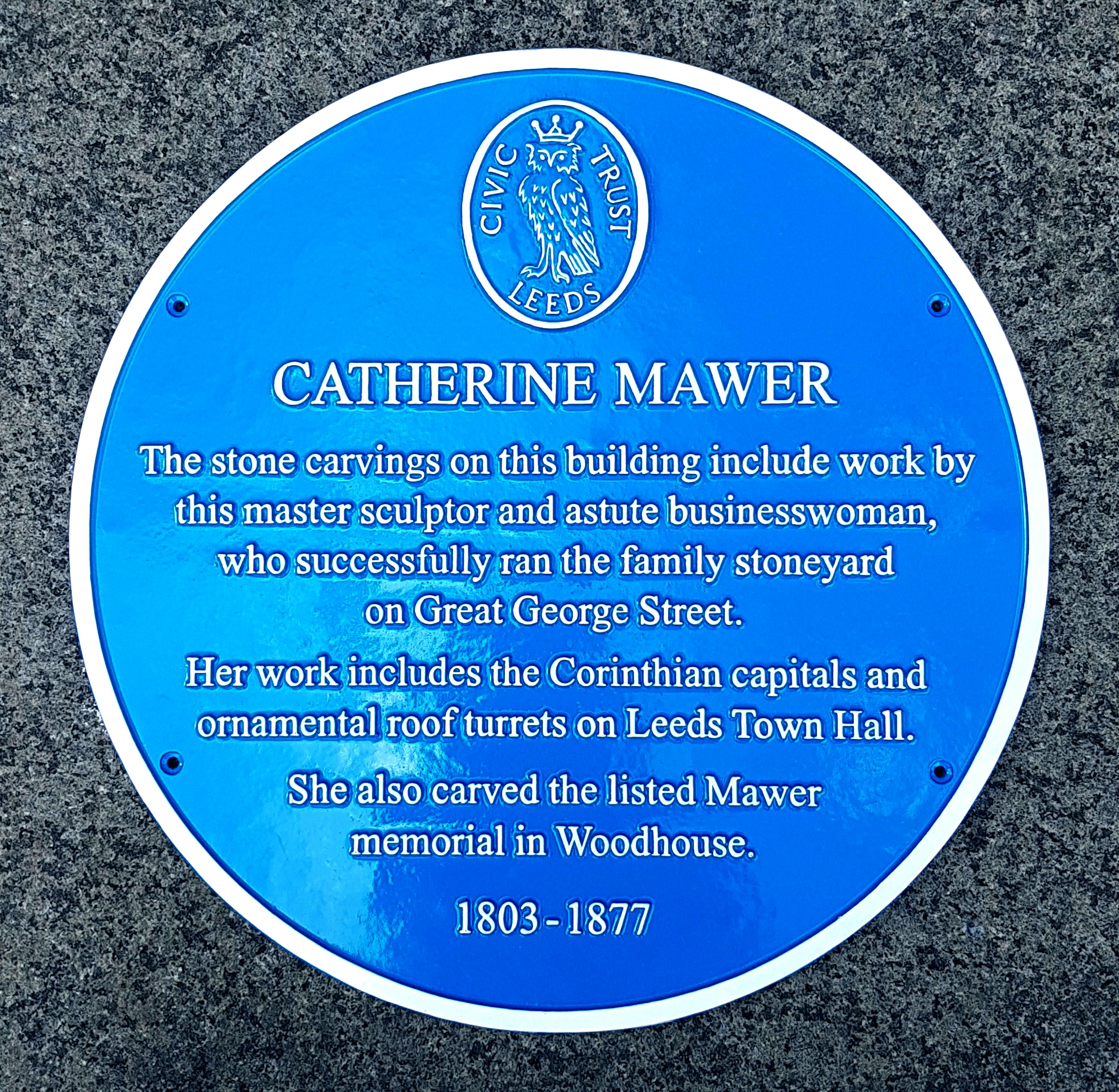
Blue plaque for Catherine Mawer

On 11 July 2019 Leeds Civic Trust unveiled two blue plaques at the Henry Moore Institute, commemorating the work of Catherine Mawer, William Ingle and the rest of the Mawer Group. These plaques are affixed to Moorlands House in Albion Street and 30 Park Place, both in Leeds.

Catherine Mawer's name is one of those featured on the sculpture Ribbons, unveiled in 2024.

== Works by Catherine Mawer ==
=== Mawer memorial, Woodhouse, after 1854 ===
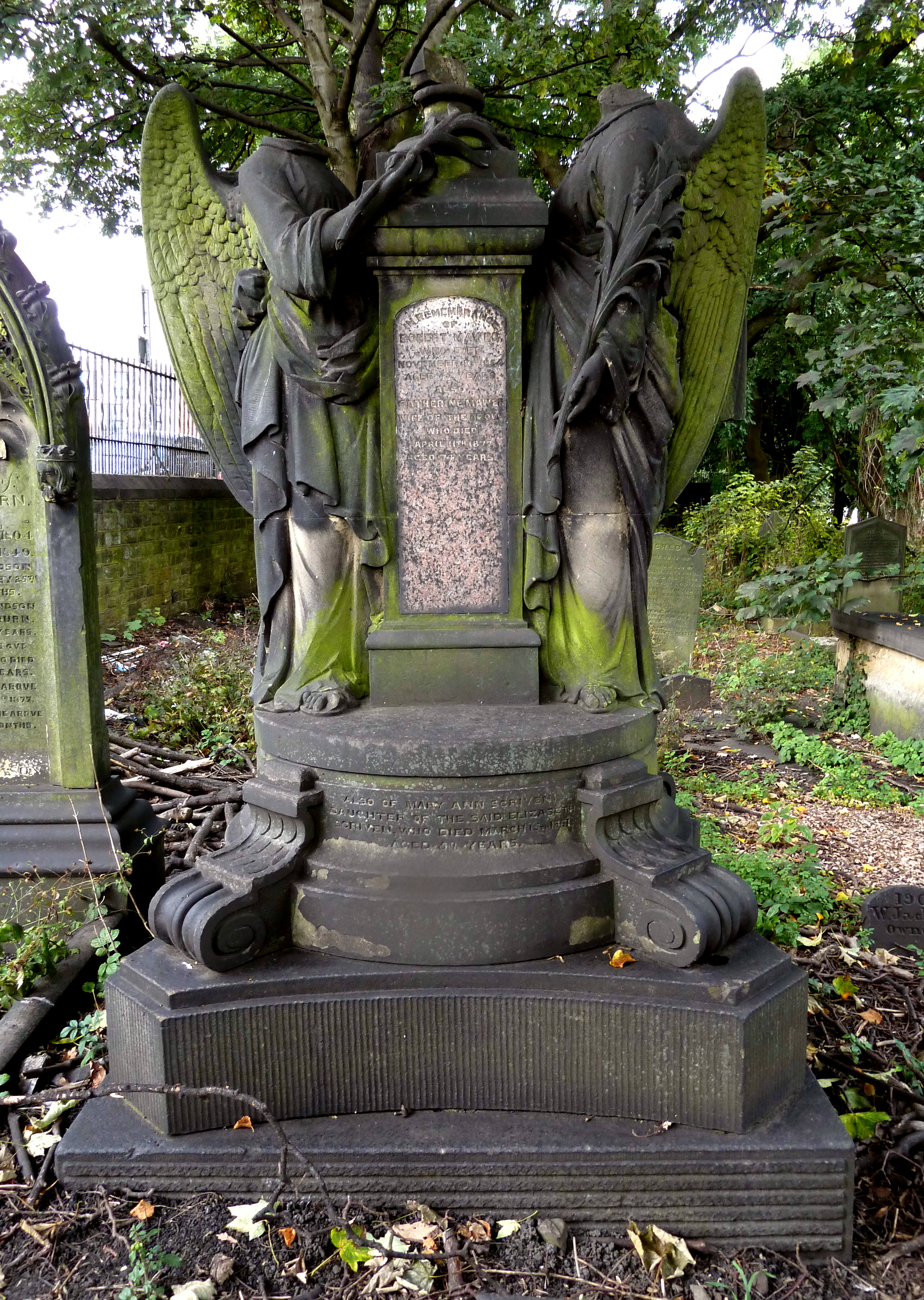
Mawer memorial, heads and urn removed by 2015

This memorial to Robert and Catherine Mawer, in the churchyard of the Church of St Mark, St Marks Road, Woodhouse, Leeds, is Grade II listed. The sculptor is not recorded, however when Robert died, Charles at age 16 was in the early stages of his apprenticeship, and this is a mature work, so it was probably executed by Catherine. It was created before Catherine's death, because her memorial was added after Robert's, in a bolder and slightly different hand. There are additional inscriptions on the gravestone, to Catherine's mother and sister, Elizabeth and Mary Ann Scriven (died 1841 and 1861 respectively). Between 1987 when the monument was listed, and 2015 when it was photographed by Geograph, the urn and the heads of the two angels were removed. Historic England describes the monument thus, as of 1987:

"Ashlar and carved stone. Shaped podium, a stepped circular console-bracketed base supports 2 almost human-size angels who are draping the inscribed column (surmounted by an urn) with a garland of flowers. Half the urn has split away."

Media related to Mawer memorial at Wikimedia Commons

=== Susannah Blesard monument, St Mark, Woodhouse, 1856 ===
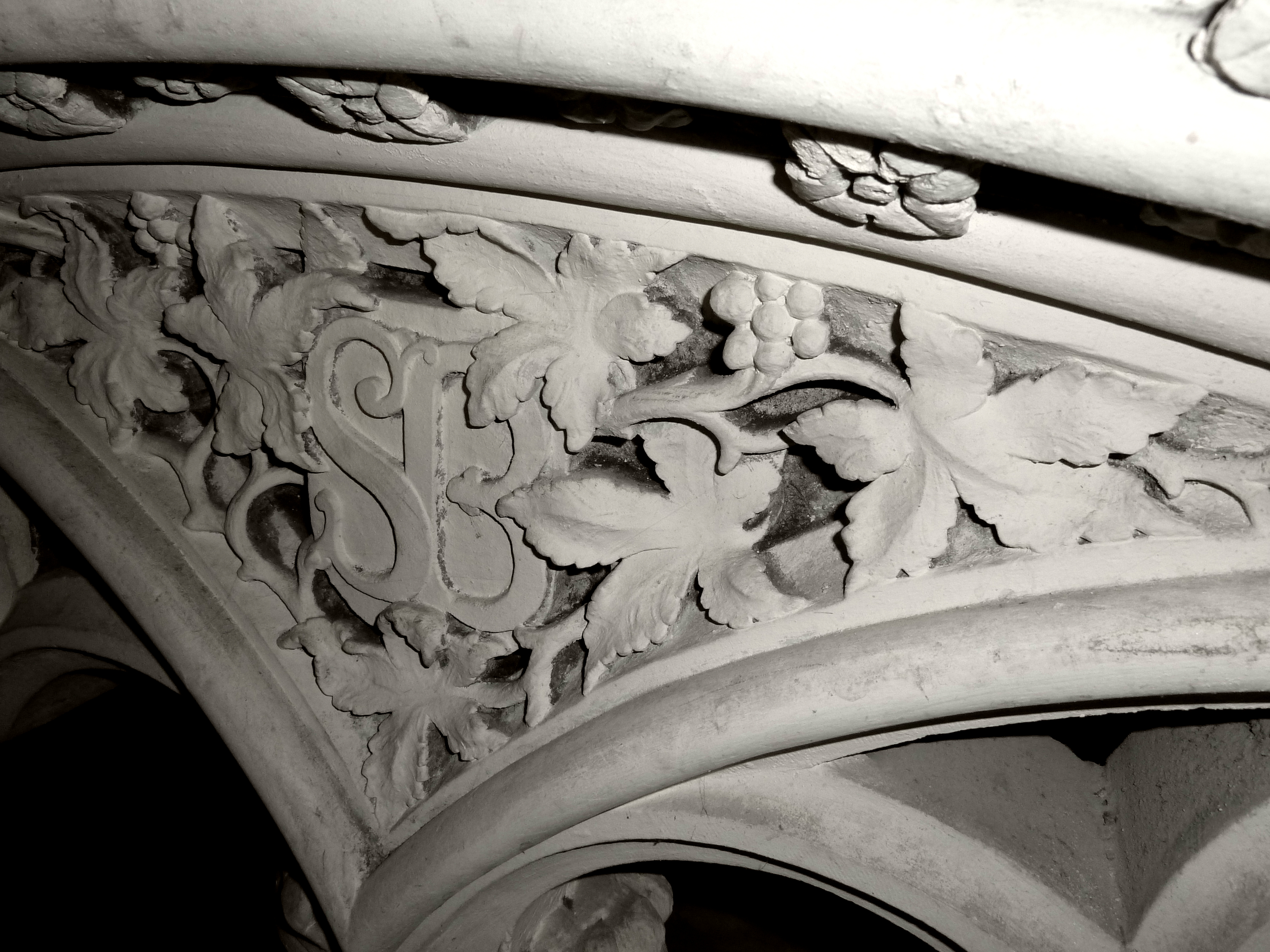
Initialled spandrel on Blesard memorial

This monument is in a Grade II listed building. St Mark's church was designed by architects Peter Atkinson and Richard Hey Sharp in 1823, consecrated on 13 January 1826, and closed in 2001. It was bought by Gateway Church in 2008, and reopened on 5 June 2014. Catherine Mawer was responsible for the Susannah Blesard tomb in 1856.

The Blesard monument was placed under a three-light stained glass window designed by Michael and Arthur O'Connor of London, illustrating the Last Supper and "Our Lord blessing little children". In 1856, the Leeds Intelligencer described the Susannah Blesard tomb:

"A beautiful monument ... which has been executed in Caen stone, is in the perpendicular style of architecture, and is erected under the north-east window of the church. The design consists of one sepulchre arch, enriched with double foliated hanging tracery, the spandrels filled in with foliage, and the monogram "S.B." with deep moulded jamb and arch mould, with ornaments and scriptural text. The spandrels above the arch are filled in with cut diaper work, the whole being surmounted with an enriched cornice and Tudor flower. The buttresses at the side are diapered, with niches and rich crocketed canopies, terminating with a carved capital and angels in a kneeling attitude. The base of the tomb, where the recumbent figure is usually placed, is filled in with quatrefoil pannelling and scriptural text - on the edge of the moulding. At the back of the recess is the following inscription, in emblazoned mediaeval letters: Susannah Blesard ... died 31st of March, 1855 ... The monument has been designed by Messrs Dobson and Chorley, architects, Leeds, and the whole has been executed by Mr. Mawer (sic) of this town, and is a work which will bear close inspection."(Leeds Intelligencer, 18 October 1856)

Media related to St Mark, Woodhouse at Wikimedia Commons

=== Former St Mark's, Low Moor, Bradford, 1855−1857 ===
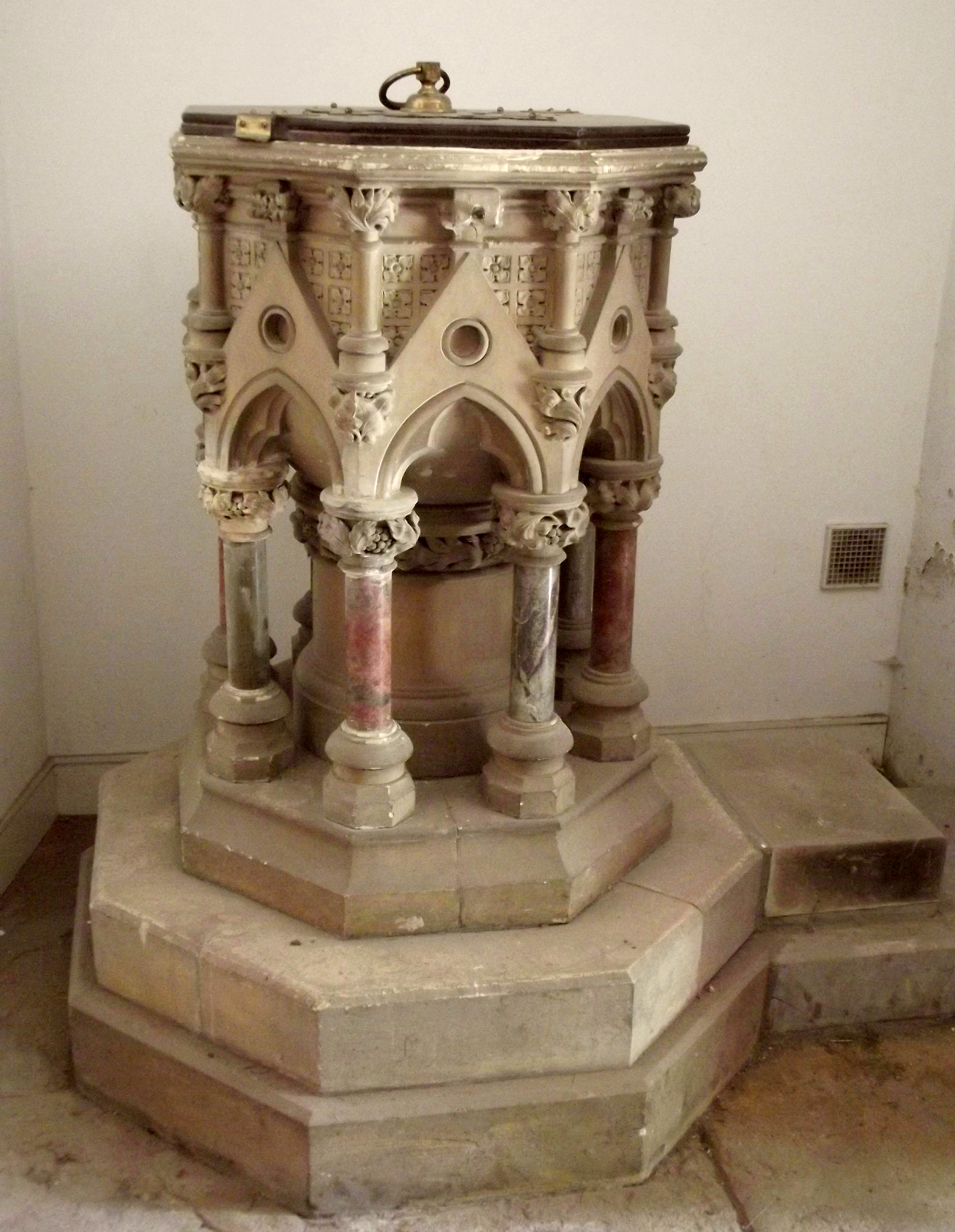
Font by Catherine Mawer, Low Moor

This is a Grade II listed building on Huddersfield Road, Low Moor, Bradford, designed by Mallinson & Healey, in Early Decorated style with an 80-foot spire. The stone carving throughout the church was executed by Catherine Mawer. The foundation stone was laid on 19 November 1855, and the building was consecrated on 11 March 1857 by the Bishop of Ripon. It closed in 2002 and as of 2017 had been developed into flats and offices. In 2011 an application was made to turn part of the graveyard into a car park.

In 1857 the Leeds Intelligencer and Bradford Observer said:

"On the south side of the nave, in the second bay, is a deeply-recessed doorway of three orders, resting upon capitals and shafts. The tympanum is richly carved in stone, and bears the inscription, The lord is nigh unto all that call upon him, and the symbol of St Mark the Evangelist - the Lion ... The Font stands on the West. It is of cup or goblet form, and rests upon four shafts of dark grey marble. It is of admirable workmanship and does ample justice to the well-earned reputation of Mrs Mawer, of Leeds. The font bears the following scripture legend, If thou believest with all thine heart, thou mayest. ... The pulpit, which is placed at the North side of the chancel arch, is octagonal, each side bearing a trefoil, which carries a four-foiled circle ... The chancel arch is of three orders, the moulding resting upon deeply carved capitals and shafts ... The roof of the nave is composed of arched ribs which run down the walls and rest upon carved stone brackets. The roofs of the transepts and chancel vary in construction, whilst the four meeting at the intersection are formed of arched braces, resting upon carved stone corbels." (Leeds Intelligencer, 14 March 1857)

Media related to Former church of St Mark, Low Moor at Wikimedia Commons

=== New Hall for Halifax Mechanics Institution, 1855−1857 ===
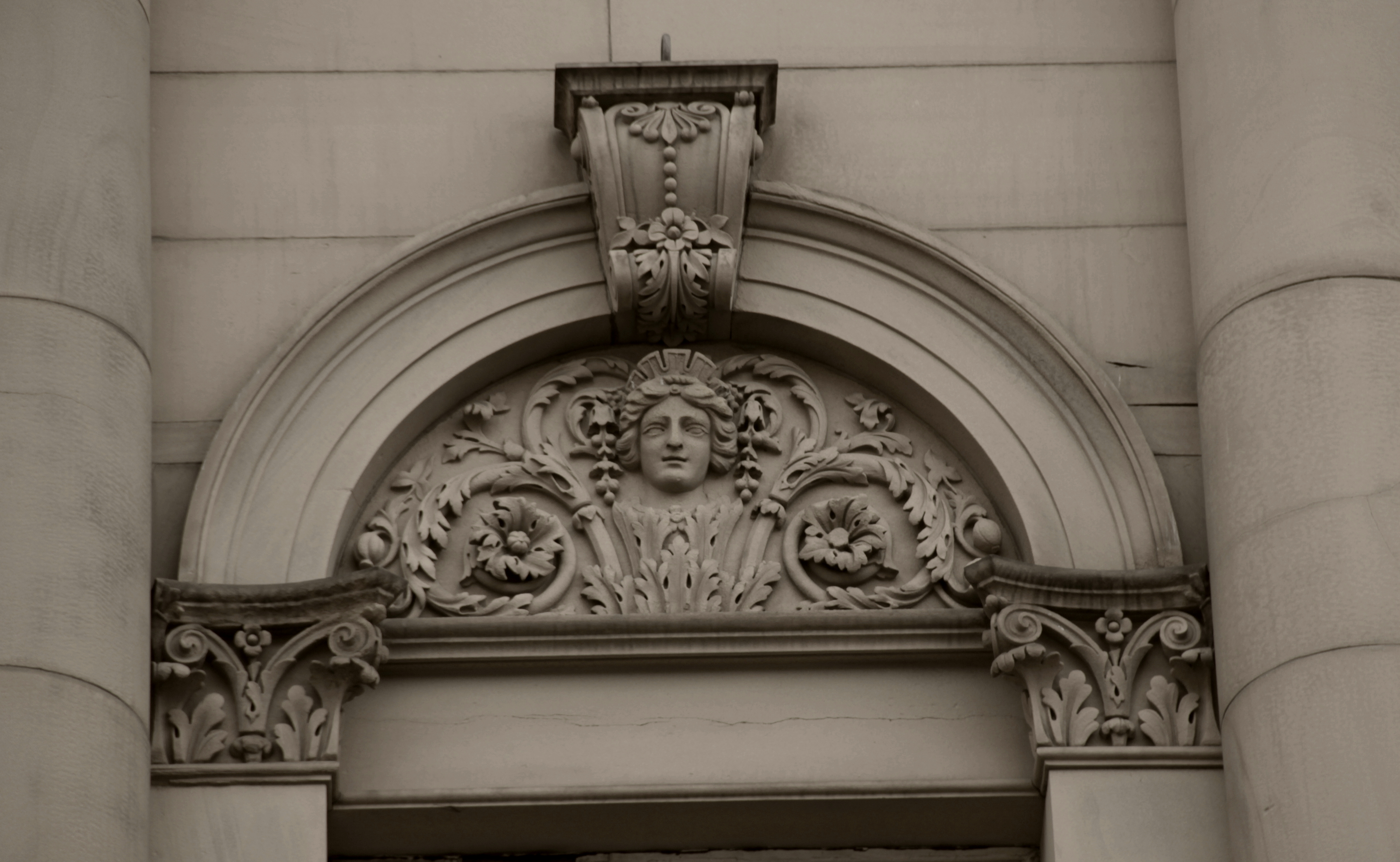
Marlborough Hall

This is a Grade II* listed building in Crossley Street opposite the Town Hall, Halifax. It is now known as Marlborough Hall. It has carved corbels on the ground floor, which once held lamps. The first floor has arched windows with carved tympanums, and massive columns between, which are topped with Corinthian capitals. It was designed by Lockwood & Mawson. Tenders were accepted on 11 April 1855, including: "Ornamental masonry work: Mrs Mawer, £125.00."

In 1857 the Leeds Intelligencer said:

"The ground storey, to a height of twenty feet from the causeway, consists of pannelled and moulded ashlar piers, from the centre of each of which springs a moulded and carved bracket, supporting a handsome lamp and globe ... The windows between are circular headed. with carved imposts, archivolts and keys, and elaborate semicircular panels in the window heads." (Leeds Intelligencer 17 January 1857)

Media related to Marlborough Hall, Halifax at Wikimedia Commons

=== Church of the Holy Innocents, Thornhill Lees 1858 ===
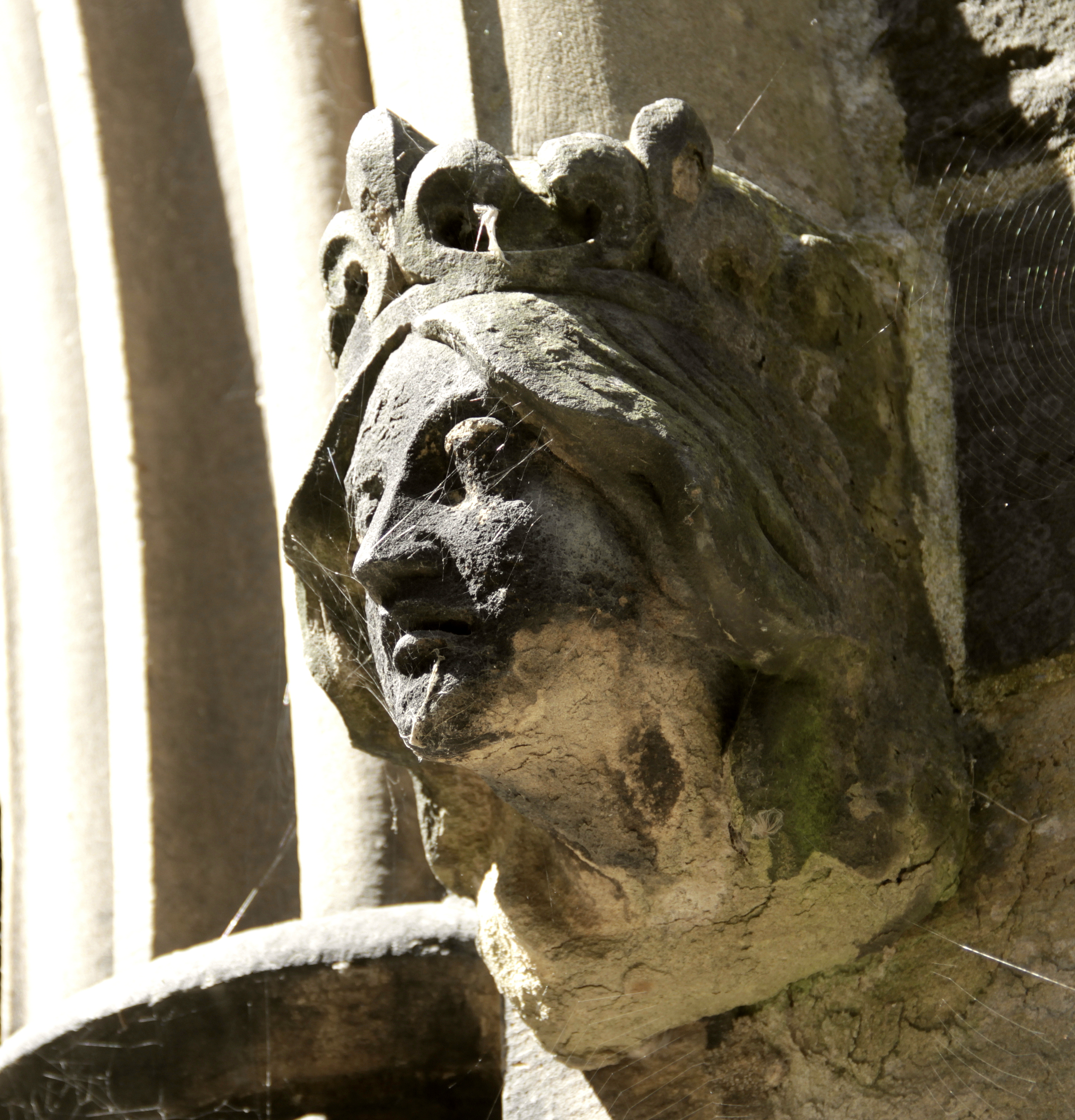
Portrait of Queen Victoria representing the State on the porch

This is an unlisted building, although the vicarage and its gates and piers are listed and dated 1858. It stands on Savile Road, Thornhill Lees, Dewsbury, and was designed in the Early Decorated style by Mallinson & Healey, of Bradford. It was consecrated on Wednesday 23 June 1858. All the stone carving was executed by Catherine Mawer. It contains many windows by William Wailes on the north and east side of the chancel, in the tower, and at the east end of the aisles. It also contains the St George's window from St Mary's, Savile Town, and the building was renovated in 1928. The church was threatened with closure in 2010 due to low congregation numbers. However it is now an Anglo-Catholic church.

In 1858 the Leeds Intelligencer said:

"The porch is entered by a foliated arch, and over the principal door is carved the text, How amiable are Thy Tabernacles, O Lord of Hosts ... Near the principal entrance stands the font, of Caen stone, with marble pillars, and an elaborate oak cover of buttress and canopy work, terminating in a pelican in her piety ... Under the east window is an elaborate reredos, of Caen stone, with marble pillars, by Mawer of Leeds, who also executed the font and the whole of the carving."(Leeds Intelligencer 26 June 1858)

Media related to Church of the Holy Innocents, Thornhill Lees at Wikimedia Commons

=== Town Hall, Leeds, 1853-1858 ===
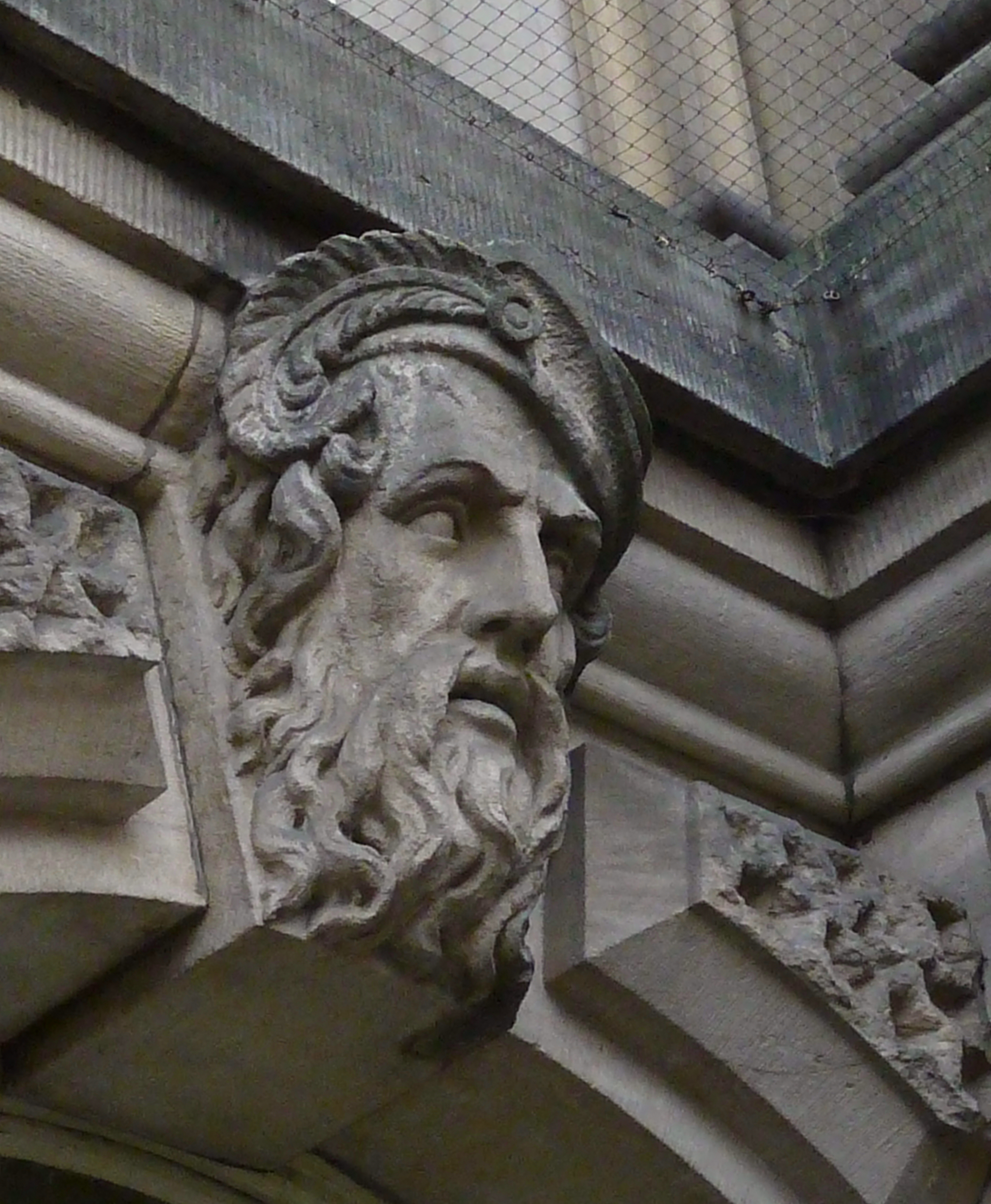
Portrait of Robert Mawer with feather in his cap, on Leeds Town Hall

This is a Grade I listed building. It was designed by Cuthbert Brodrick and the foundation stone was laid on 14 August 1853. It was opened by Queen Victoria and Prince Albert on 7 September 1858.

The carving in the most prestigious position, in the tympanum over the main entrance, is the sole contribution by Thomas of London, the "sculptor of the Houses of Parliament." The artisan credited for the general carving work on the building is "Mrs Mawer, Leeds", who lived next door. She was responsible for the huge Corinthian capitals and the ornamental turrets on the roof. However Robert Mawer was working on the "large keystones carved with Mythical heads" or "giant masks", between 1853 and 1854, when he died. Thomas Whiteley, the stonemason associated with Robert Mawer, also worked on the building; he was not a sculptor. The carvings are in Rawdon Hill millstone grit.

In 1858, the Leeds Intelligencer said that:

Thomas's tympanum over the main door "represents Leeds in its commercial character." [To complement this], "The large panels [by Mawer] on each side of the entrance doorways are filled in with bold and classic scrolls and foliage, in the centre of each of which is a child bearing the fleece, having beneath the fasces and other emblems of Power and Justice, and above the caduceus of Mercury.(Leeds Intelligencer 11 Sep 1858)

Media related to Leeds Town Hall at Wikimedia Commons

=== Memorial tablet, John the Baptist Knaresborough, 1859–1860 ===
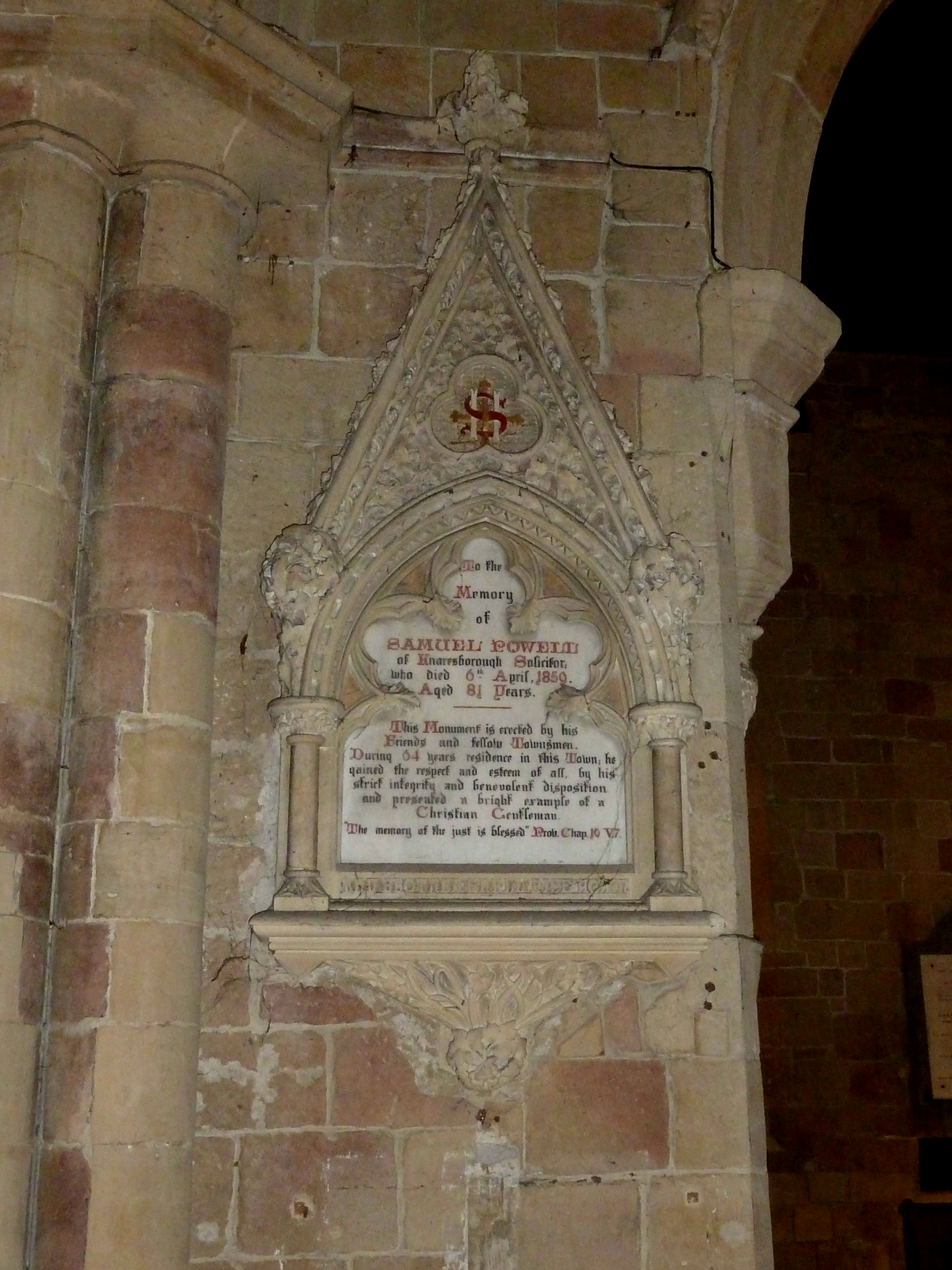
Samuel Powell memorial

In November 1859, a tender of £18 from "Mr Mawer" was accepted for a memorial tablet dedicated to Samuel Powell. Charles Mawer was only 20 years old and not yet able to be a partner in the company. William Ingle was 30 years old, but his name was not mentioned for the tender, so it must have been still Catherine Mawer's company. In 1860 the memorial was "placed on the south west pillar of the central tower of the parish church", and the Leeds Mercury commented:

"The tablet is a neat specimen of workmanship, and reflects great credit on Mr. Mawer (sic), has been highly approved of by those who have seen it, and will no doubt give satisfaction to the subscribers generally. It is about nine feet high and four wide, and projects about eight inches from the wall. It is executed in Caen stone, bearing a white marble tablet, illuminated with mediaeval characters. The design is by Mr. Joseph Fawcett, architect, Sheffield." (Leeds Mercury 22 March 1860)

In the same year, the Yorkshire Gazette reported:

"The base is corbelled out from the wall, and is adorned with lillies and vines. The arch over the tablet is carried on two small columns, one foot high, with caps foliated with lillies and strawberry leaves. The arch is decorated with tooth and other mouldings, and has rich trefoil cuspings with the eyes filled in with polished Sienna marble. The spandril over-arch is covered with creeping foliage, consisting of the passion flower and the vine gracefully entwined, and surrounding in a sunk trefoil panel with illuminated monogram in the centre, relieved against a diapered background. The upper part is finished by a rich label moulding springing from bosses of ivy leaves on each side, and terminating in a finial of similar character, and enriched with running ivy at the top, and thorn leaves in the hollow moulding of the under side. The monument has been neatly executed, at a small cost, by Mr. Mawer, sculptor, Leeds." (Yorkshire Gazette 24 March 1860)

Media related to Samuel Powell memorial, John the Baptist, Knaresborough at Wikimedia Commons

=== St Peter, Barton-upon-Humber, restoration 1859 ===
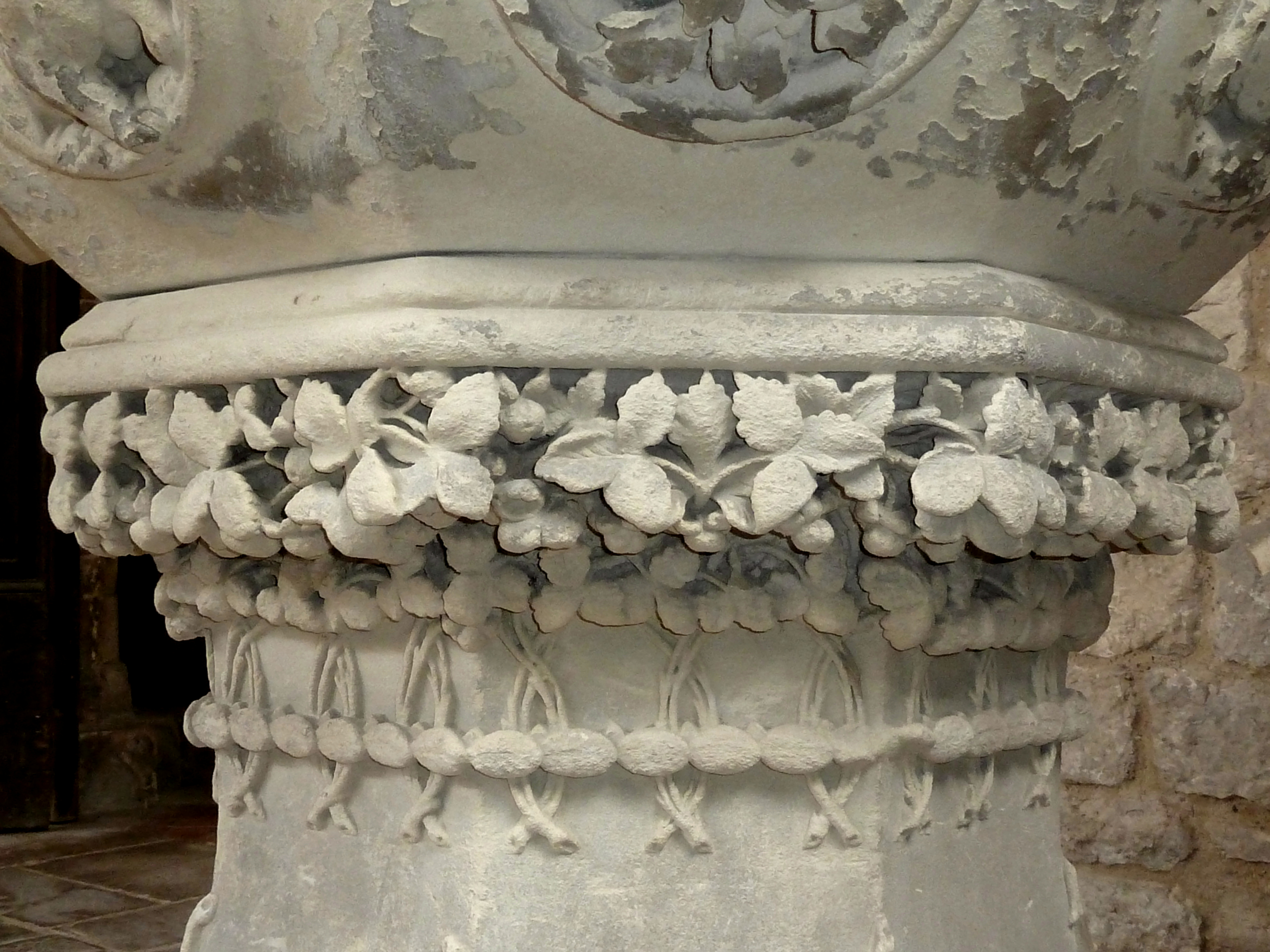
Delicate frieze on font at St Peter, Barton

This is a Grade I listed building; part of the tower dates from the 10th century, and other parts of the building are 13th and 14th century. The building was restored internally, with "sundry alterations to the tower and roof," by Cuthbert Brodrick and reopened in 1859. The Hull Packet gave this description in 1859:

"The pulpit, which is of elaborate design, stands on a pedestal of Caen stone, and is of hexagon shape. It stands on the north of the chancel arch ... The font, on the left hand as you enter the church by the south side porch, is a very beautiful work of art; it is of octagon shape, and [its stand is] covered with encaustic tiles on the top and sides. The font itself is made of Caen stone, and very elaborately carved with the emblems of the Four Evangelists in bold relief, and an inscription running round the top part in old character. The inscription is, "Except a man be born of water and of the Spirit he cannot enter the kingdom of God." The font is, we understand, the gift of the vicar. The carving has been done at Leeds, by Messrs. Mawer, from sketches by the architect." (Hull Packet, 3 June 1859)

Media related to St Peter's Church, Barton-upon-Humber at Wikimedia Commons
Media related to St Mary Barton-Upon-Humber (pulpit) at Wikimedia Commons

=== St Stephen's Church, Bowling Old Lane, 1859–1860 ===
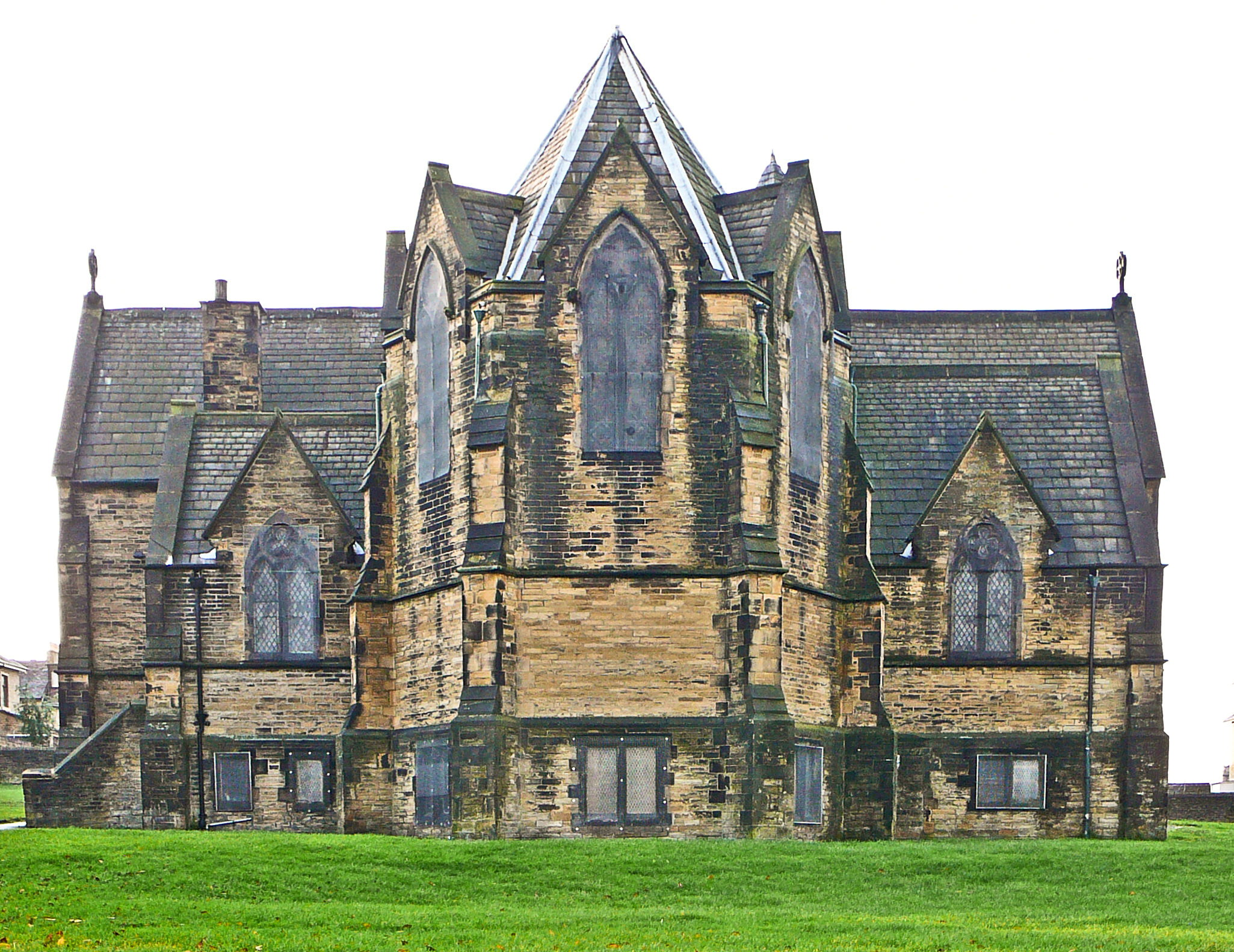
Apse of St Stephen, West Bowling

This is a Grade II listed building. The church in Newton Street, West Bowling, Bradford, was designed by Mallinson and Healey of Bradford. The foundation stone was laid on 2 July 1859, and the building was consecrated on Tuesday 24 April 1860 by the Bishop of Ripon. This was one of seven churches for which Charles Hardy was a major benefactor. This building of 611 sittings had a nave with aisles, a chancel with a hexagonal apse, and a tower with belfry at the north-west corner. The 27-inch bell was of cast steel, by Naylor and Vickers of Sheffield. Over the main entrance, which was via a recessed doorway on the north side, was the inscription: "Blessed is that man that maketh the Lord his trust" (Psalm 40:4). There were four dormer windows on each side of the nave roof instead of a clerestory. The first incumbent was the Rev. T.A. Stowell M.A., who was previously the curate of Bolton, in Calverley.

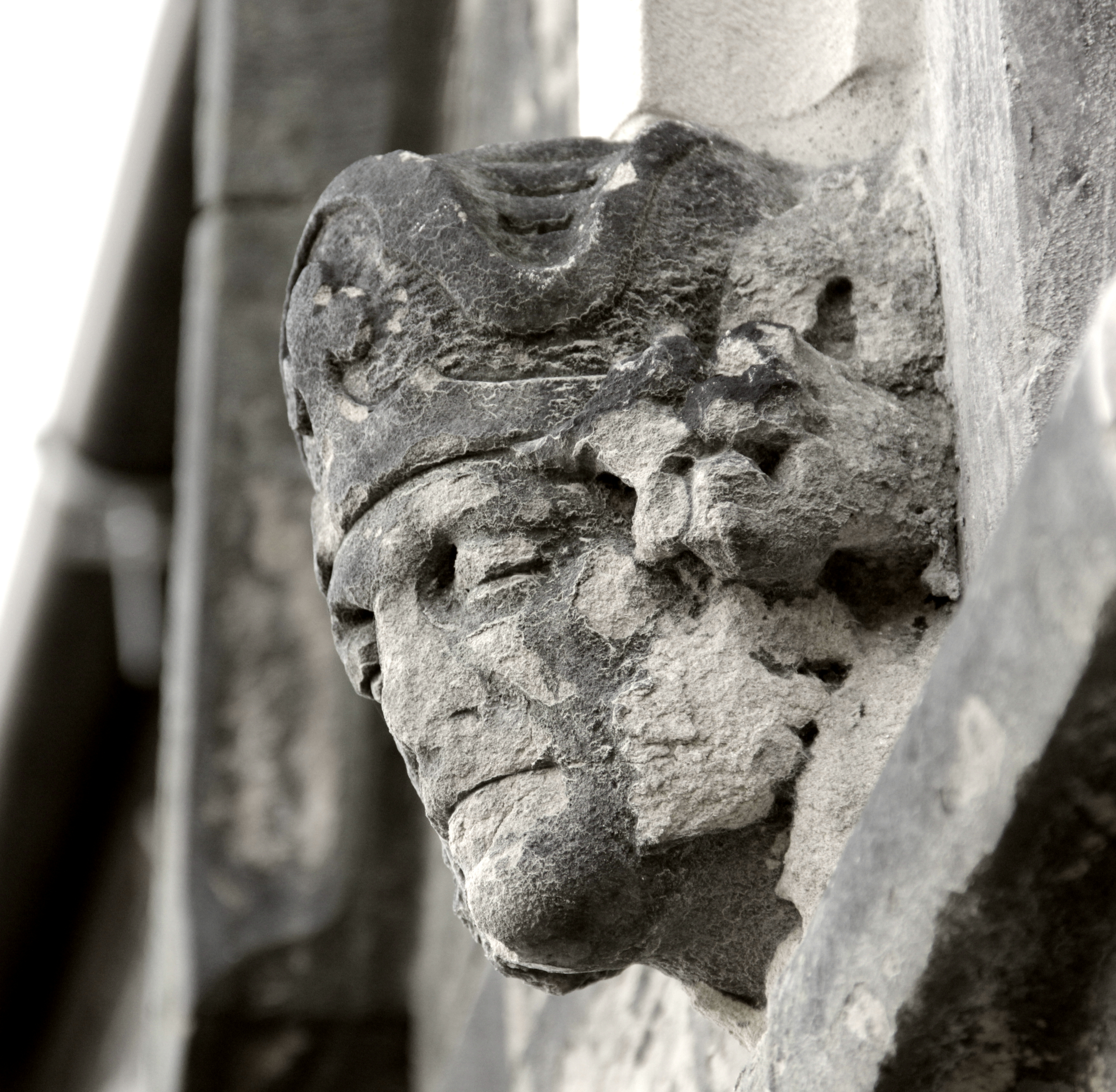
Weather-worn portrait of Robert Bickersteth by Catherine Mawer

The Leeds Intelligencer reported:

"The font, which is at the west end of the nave, is of Caen stone, octagonal, supported on marble pillars, and enriched with carvings of the evangelistic symbols. Around the base is the legend: As many as are led by the Spirit of God, they are the sons of God (Romans 8:14). It is the work of Mr. (sic) Mawer, of Leeds, and does great credit to his taste and skill." (Leeds Intelligencer 28 April 1860)

In 1859 when the commission was taken up, Robert Mawer was dead and Charles Mawer had not completed his apprenticeship, so it is reasonable to suppose that the author of the font was Catherine Mawer. As of 2018 the original Caen stone font is not visible; in the nave is a smaller, late nineteenth century Derbyshire alabaster font without the Evangelists' symbols or any inscription. In 1887 the building was enlarged and renovated by architect M. Brayshaw; a Caen stone and alabaster reredos and a chancel window by Powell were added.

Media related to St Stephen's Church, Bowling at Wikimedia Commons

== See also ==
- Robert Mawer
- Charles Mawer
- Benjamin Payler
- Matthew Taylor (sculptor)
- Benjamin Burstall
- Mawer and Ingle
- William Ingle
