= Charles Mawer =

British architectural sculptor

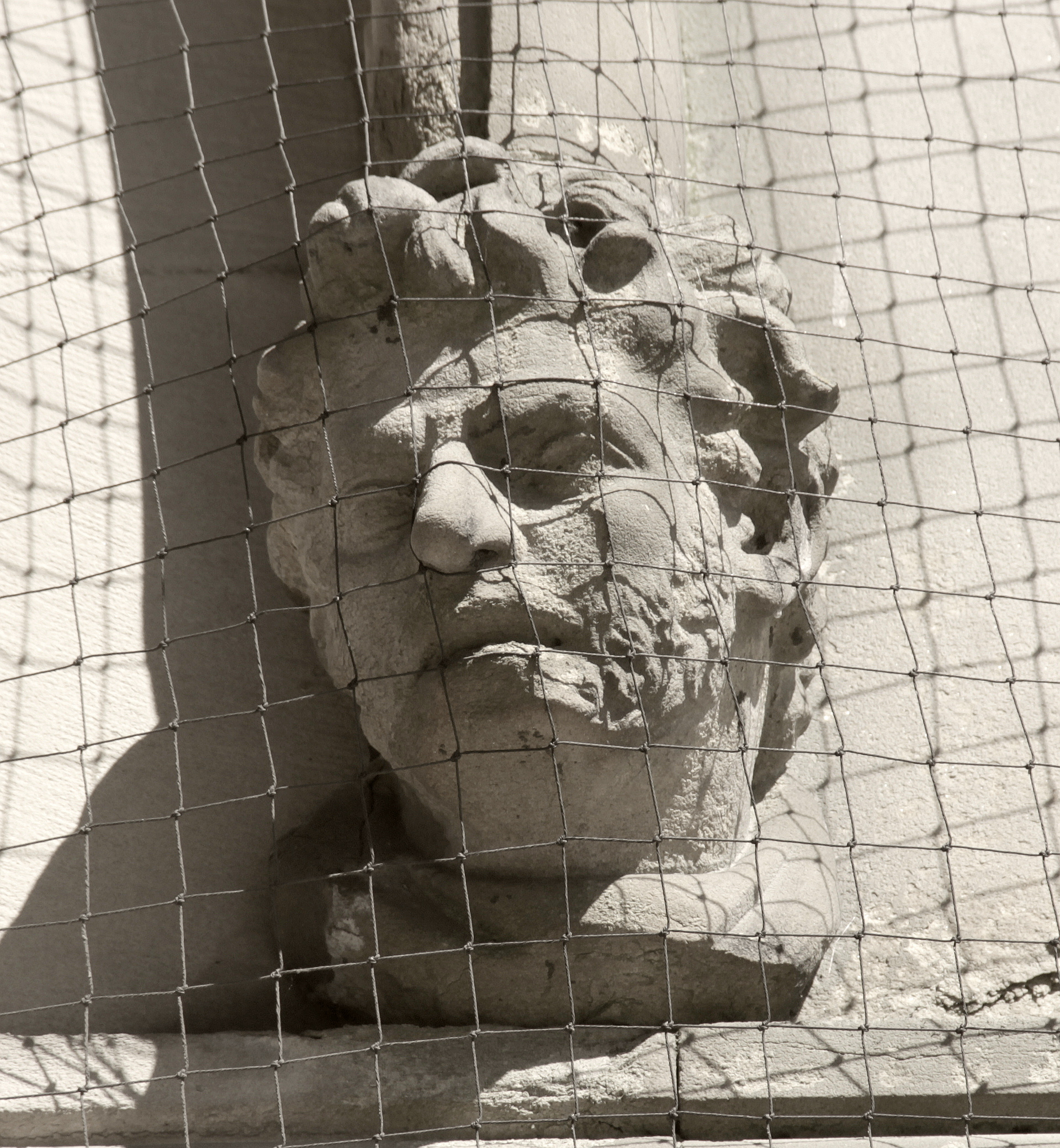
- Portrait of Charles Mawer aged about 29 years, on Old Commercial Bank, Bradford
- Born: circa 1839; Leeds
- Died: 8 December 1903; Union Workhouse, Skipton
- Notable work: Restoration of: St Michael, Barton-le-Street, 1871; Architectural sculpture on: Kirkgate Market Bradford, 1872; St Matthew, Lightcliffe, 1875; St Thomas, Killinghall, 1880
- Style: Gothic Revival
- Movement: Aesthetic movement Romanticism; Gothic Revival

Charles Mawer (1839–1903) (fl. 1860–1881) was an architectural sculptor, based in Leeds, West Yorkshire, England. He was the son of sculptors Robert and Catherine Mawer and the cousin of William Ingle. He was apprenticed to his father, and worked within the partnership Mawer and Ingle alongside his cousin William and his own mother between 1860 and 1871, and then ran the stone yard himself until he formed a partnership with his fellow-apprentice Benjamin Payler in 1881. Following that date, his whereabouts and death are unknown. His last major work for Mawer and Ingle was Trent Bridge, where he carved alone, following the death of William Ingle. He is noted for his work on the rebuilding of the mediaeval Church of St Michael and All Angels, Barton-le-Street, completed in 1871, where he repaired and recreated damaged and missing Romanesque carvings, and for his carving on William Swinden Barber's 1875 Church of St Matthew, Lightcliffe. Charles' last known work ornaments another Barber church: the 1880 Church of St Thomas the Apostle, Killinghall. Charles was a member of the Mawer Group of Leeds architectural sculptors, which included those mentioned above, plus Matthew Taylor.

== Background ==
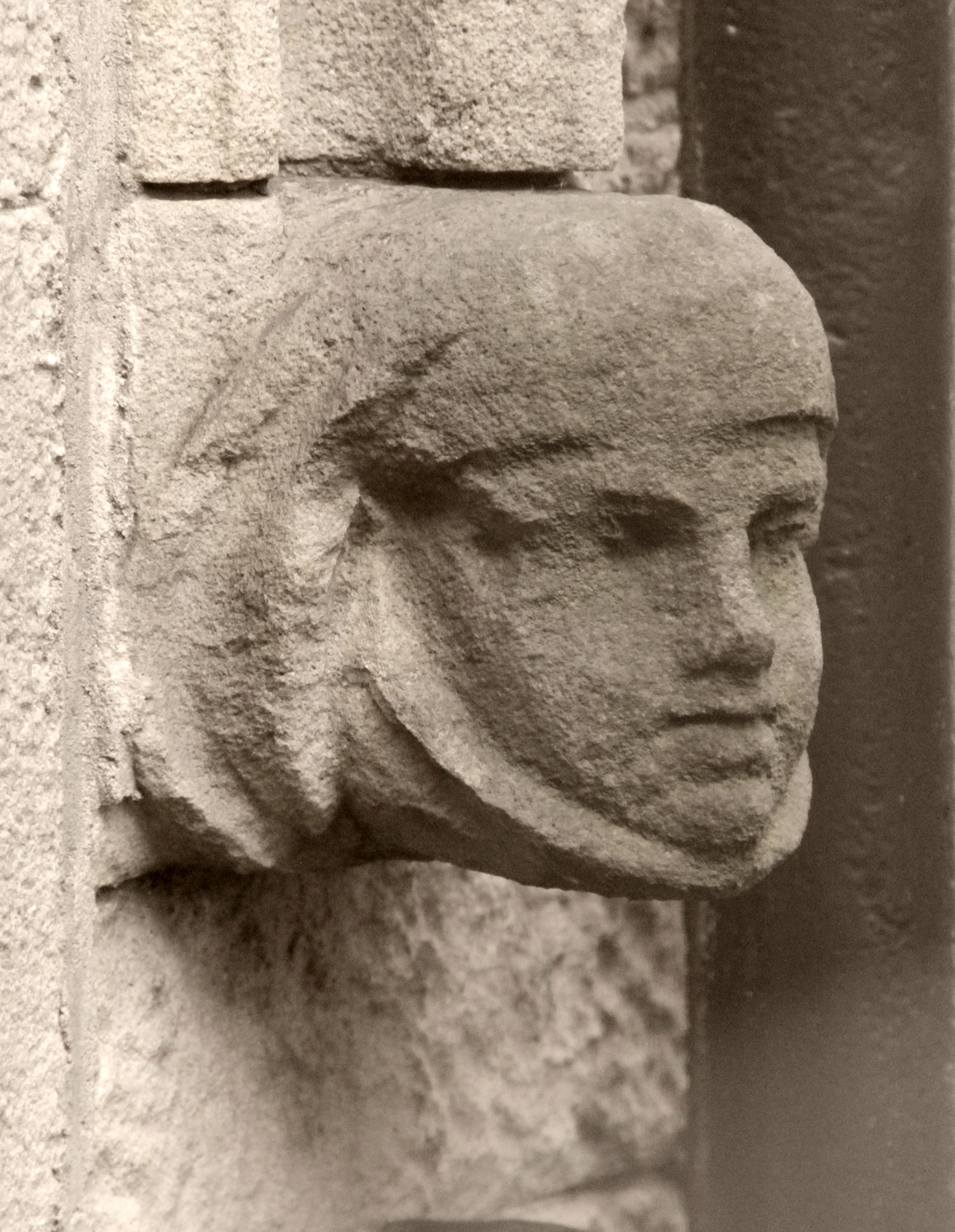
Charles aged about 8 years, by Robert Mawer

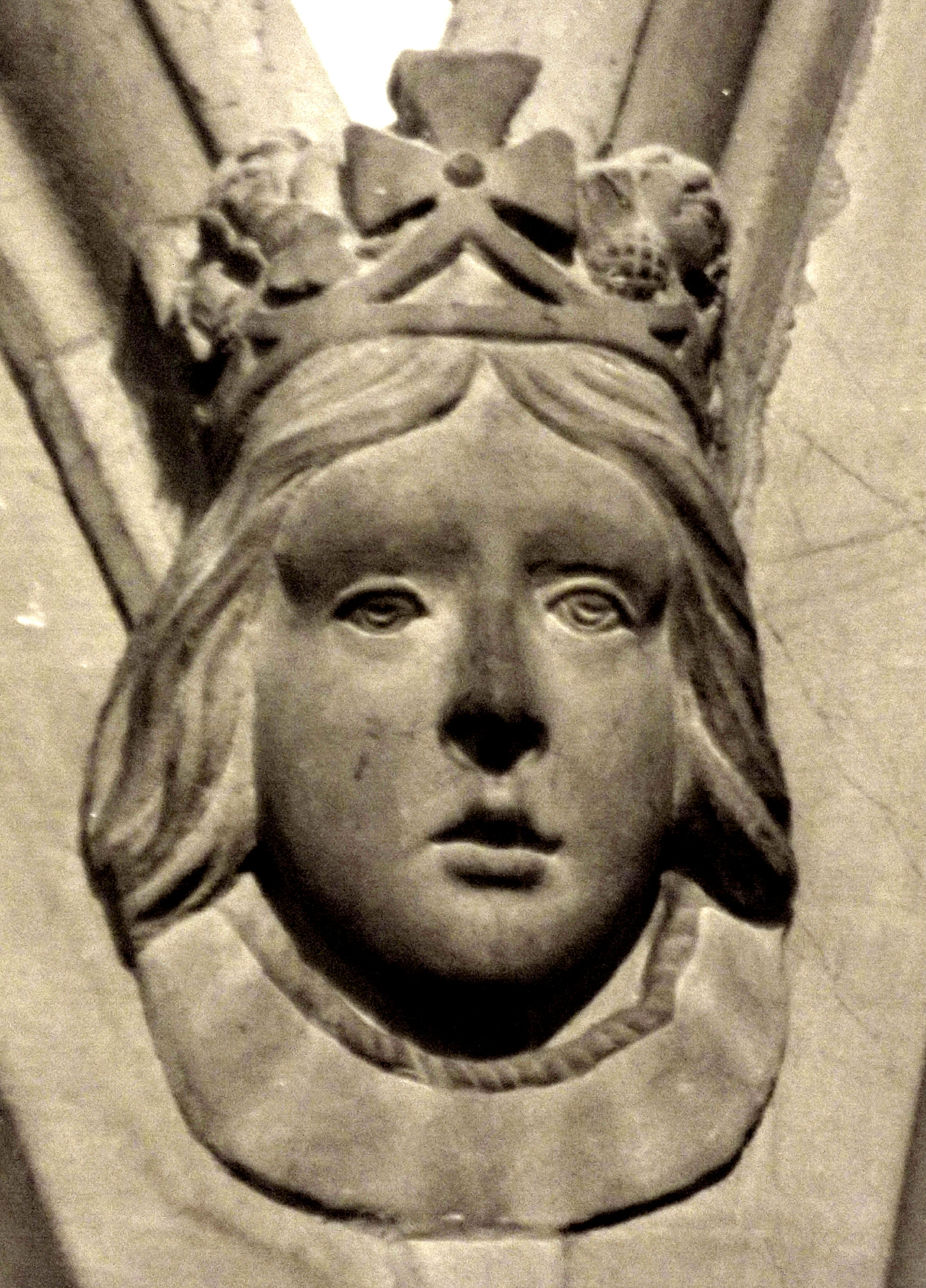
Portrait of Charles aged 9 years (ca.1848) by Robert Mawer

Charles Mawer, son of Robert Mawer and Catherine Scriven, was born in Leeds around 1839. According to the 1841 census, by age two years he was living in New Huddersfield, Leeds, with his parents and his maternal grandmother Elizabeth Scriven. In the 1851 Census, Charles is described as a scholar of twelve years old and living with his parents at 6 Oxford Place, Leeds. No evidence has been found that he married. His name does not appear in the Leeds Electoral Roll from 1882.

Charles died of apoplexy on 8 December 1903 in the infirmary of the Union Workhouse, Skipton. (Note: The Skipton workhouse was listed as being in Skipton-upon-Swale, in Thirsk Poor Law Union. Images and plans are given at The Workhouse, Skipton, West Yorkshire.) He had lately been a monumental mason at Barnoldswick, and his age was incorrectly given as 70 years. His age was around 64 years.

== Career ==
By 1861 he was a stone carver aged 22, living with his widowed mother at 7 Oxford Place, Leeds. By 1871 they had moved to 9a Oxford Place and Charles was describing himself as a stone carver and mason. He was a partner in Catherine Mawer & Son, and was active as a sculptor between at least 1861 and 1882. Charles was also a landlord in 1877-1881, renting out offices in the Britannia Buildings in Oxford Place, Leeds. By 1882,Benjamin Payler had joined him at 50a George's Street (now Great George Street), and they are described as sculptors in Leeds Directory (Post Office) in that year. In the 1881 census he is 44 years old and still unmarried, described as a sculptor employing nine men and one boy. He is living alone at house no.17 in Aldborough, North Yorkshire, now part of Boroughbridge, two doors away from the Aldeburgh Arms (now Penrose House). He remained there until at least 1884.

== Works for Mawer and Ingle ==
The company Mawer & Ingle was started in 1860 when Charles came of age at 21 years and completed his apprenticeship. William Ingle died in 1870 when Catherine was aged 67 years; thereafter Charles Mawer was probably carving alone when the work involved travelling, after 1870.

- Former Barnsley Cemetery chapels, lodges and gateway, 1860–1861
- Warehouses, Bradford, 1862
- Church of St Mary, Aldborough, North Yorkshire, Boroughbridge, 1861
- Former St Bartholomew's, Armley, Leeds, 1861
- Church of St Ricarius, Aberford, 1862
- Former St Matthews, Chapel Allerton, 1861-1863
- Reredos at Christ Church, High Harrogate, 1861–1862
- Albert Memorial, Queensbury, 1863
- Church of St Peter, Bramley, 1861-1863
- Hepper & Sons auctioneers sales rooms and offices, East Parade, Leeds 1863
- Warehouses, 30 Park Place, Leeds, 1865
- Endcliffe Hall, Sheffield, 1863–1865
- Former St John the Evangelist, Wortley, Leeds, 1864–1865
- Former Holy Trinity, Louth 1866
- Memorial tablet at Holy Trinity, Low Moor, Bradford, 1866
- Wool Exchange, Bradford, 1864-1867
- Statues of Sweep and Shoeblack, originally in Peel Park, Bradford, 1867
- Former Church of St Peter, Dewsbury Road, Hunslet Moor, 1866-1868
- Commercial Bank, Bradford, 1867-1868
- Former Church of St Clement, Chapeltown Road, Leeds, 1867–1868
- St John the Evangelist, Lepton, 1866–1868
- Former Unitarian Chapel, Chapel Lane, Bradford, 1869
- Scottish Widows insurance building, Park Row, Leeds, 1869
- United Free Methodists day and infant schools, Farsley, 1869
- Christ Church, Windhill, Shipley, 1868–1869
- Former Church of St Silas, Hunslet, 1868–1869
- Church of St John the Evangelist, Dewsbury, 1869
- Former Church of All Saints, Woodlesford, 1869-1870
- Trent Bridge, 1868-1871
- Former Congregational Church, Lightcliffe, 1870-1871

Media related to Mawer and Ingle at Wikimedia Commons

== Independent works by Charles Mawer ==
=== St Michael and All Angels, Barton-le-Street, 1869-1871 ===
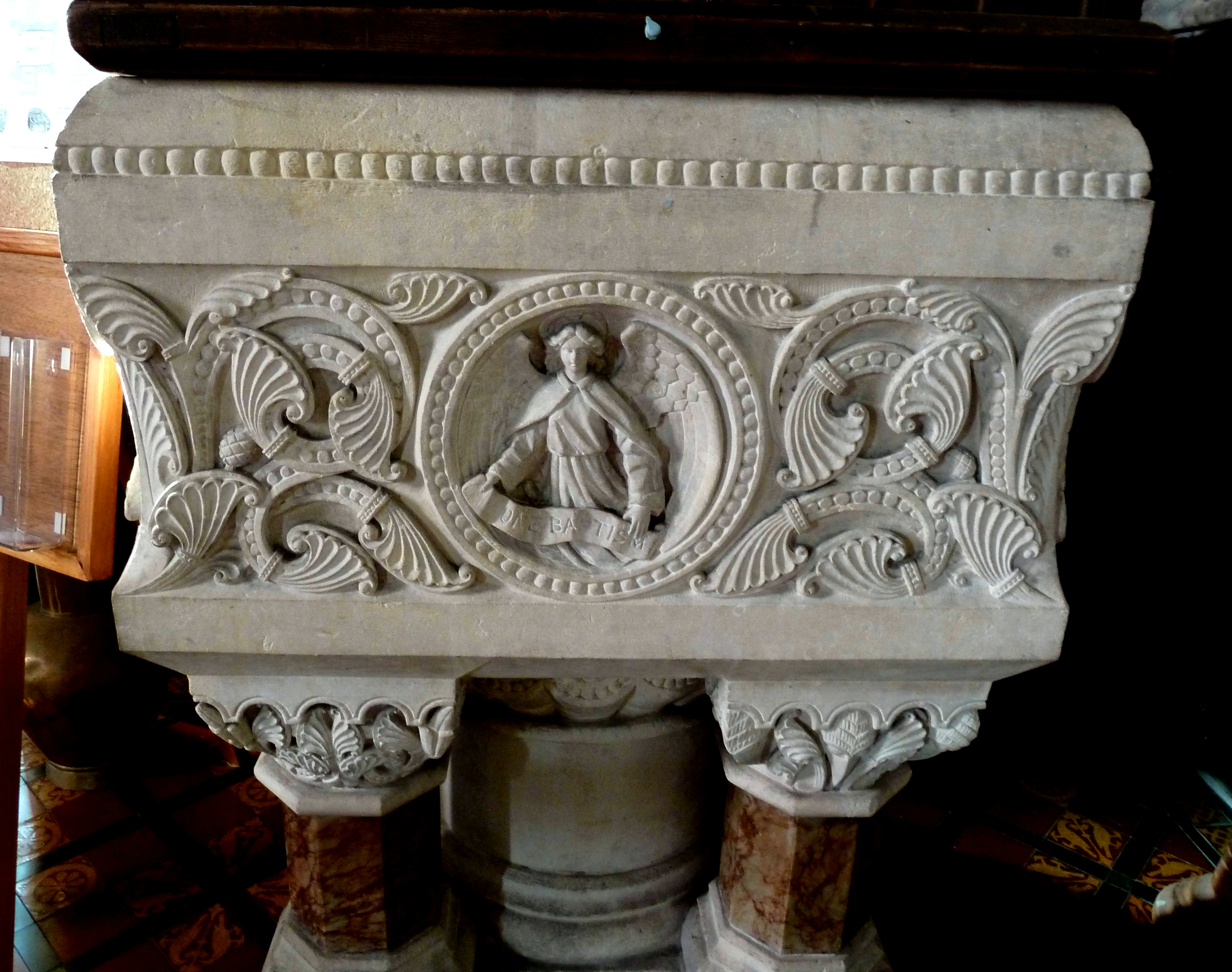
Mawer's font, incorporating medieval motifs

St Michael & All Angels' church, Barton-le-Street, Ryedale, North Yorkshire, first constructed in the 1160s, is a Grade I listed building. Its mediaeval carvings "suggest that masons and stone-carvers who had worked on the cathedrals at York or Durham may have been employed here. Their work shows influence from Western France and Lombardy in the great Norman tradition of stone-carving." It was rebuilt with "stone from the Whitby and Appleton quarries" The "Victorian decorative detail and sculpture [is] generally in Birdsall sandstone; medieval sculptural decoration [is] in Hildenley limestone."

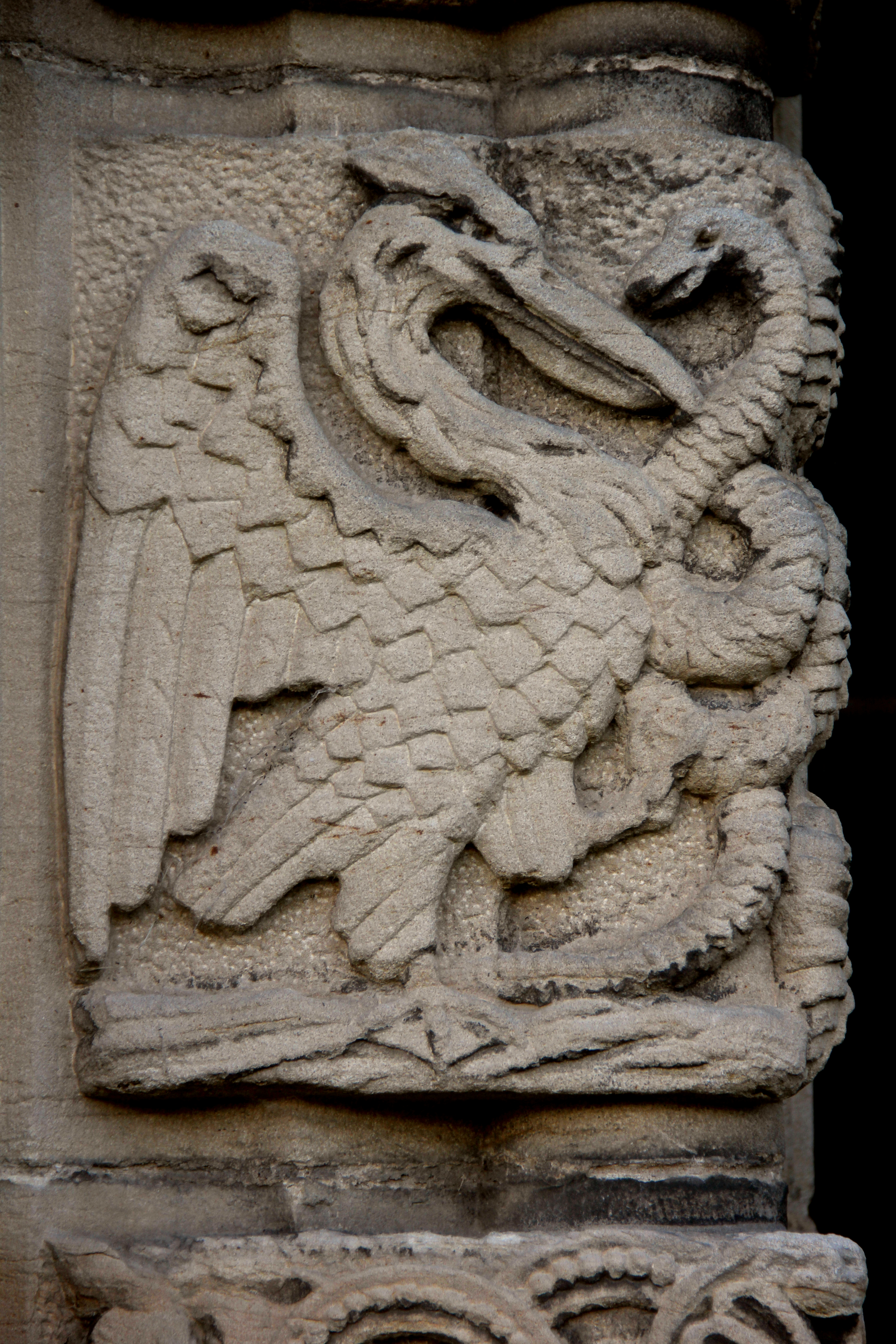
Doorjamb block by Mawer

It was constructed between 1869 and 1871 in collaboration with architect William Perkin (1808-1874), and reopened quietly on Sunday 18 June 1871.

The building incorporates almost 300 pieces of 12th century sculpture. "Care was taken to reuse and preserve as much of the original sculptural decoration as possible, generally with original sculpture reused internally with new sculpture employed externally." There are fifteen carved panels around the doorjambs of the south porch; five of these are mediaeval; the rest are "high quality Victorian reproductions" by Mawer. Regarding the inner porch doorway: seven of the doorjamb stones are mediaeval, and five are by Mawer. The chancel arch, in imitation of an original voussoir found in a wall, is by Mawer. Of the eight capitals supporting the arch, six are original and two are "high quality" works by Mawer. Charles "executed fine neo-Romanesque carving" to replace or repair stones in the restoration of this building. "The font at the west end is of Caen stone, on alabaster shafts and capitals. It is the work of Mr C. Mawer, of Leeds," and carved "in a rather elaborate Norman style."

Inside the church: "with some elements, such as the continuous running scroll frieze forming a high dado, it is difficult to separate the original C12 work from Victorian repair." "It is worth comparing the originals with the elaborate and finely-carved modern corbels on the outside of the church which also have all the whimsy and some of the subject matter of Norman corbels." St Michael's was primarily listed for its 12th century carvings, but with respect to the Victorian craftsmanship: "particularly for the high quality C12 style stone sculpture by Charles Mawer."

Media related to St Michael and All Angels, Barton-le-Street at Wikimedia Commons

=== Former Archibald Ramsden premises, 12 Park Row, 1872 ===
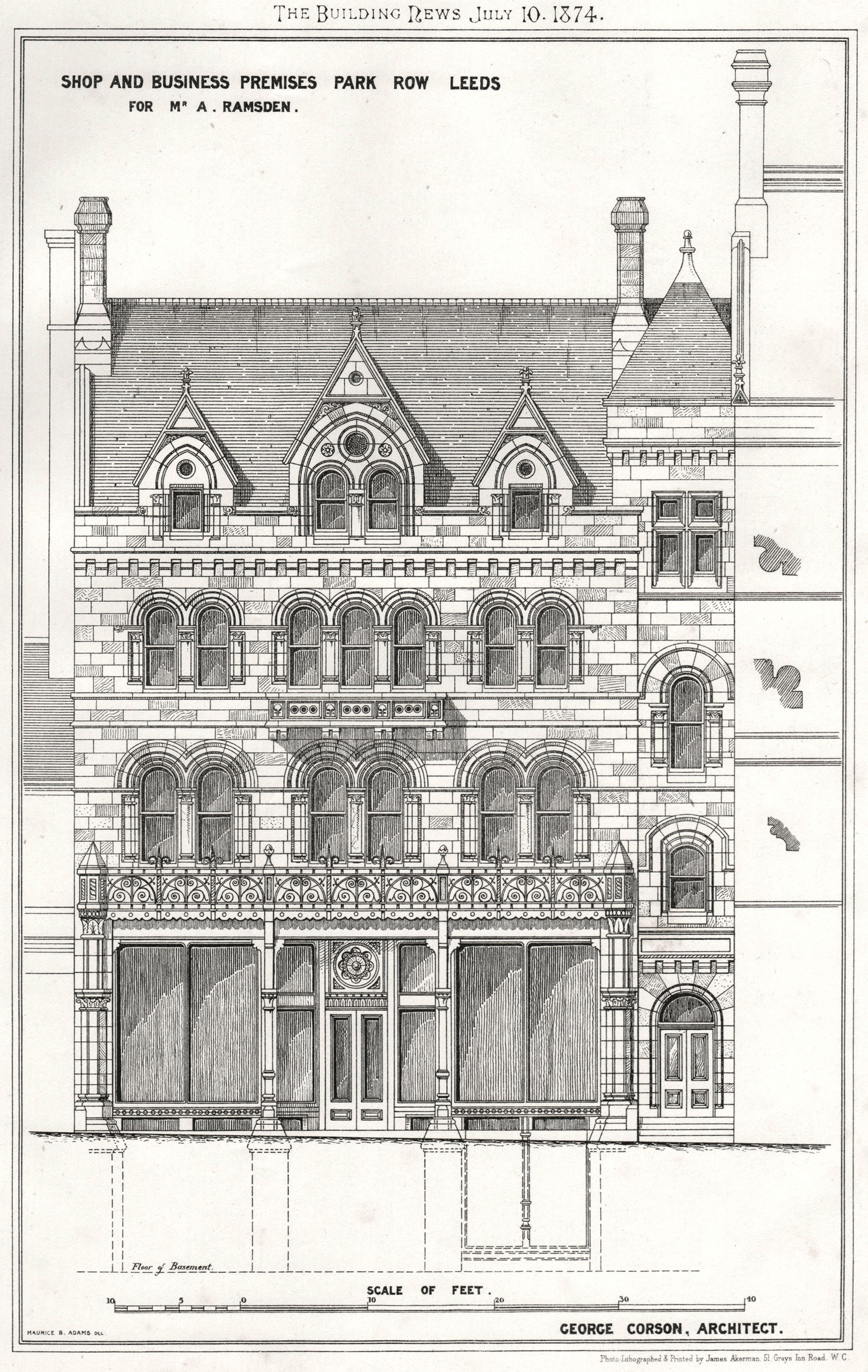
Lithograph of Ramsden's, 1874

The former Archibald Ramsden premises at 12 Park Row, Leeds, was designed by George Corson for the music publisher, and opened for business on Tuesday 26 March 1872. Ramsden's was on the east side of Park Row, next to the former Royal Insurance offices which was on its south side, and backing on to Basinghall Street. It stood just north of the site of the present modern Natwest bank, which is on the corner of Park Row and Bond Street. In 1872, the Yorkshire Post and Leeds Intelligencer refers to the carving on the frontage:

The ground floor "is flanked on each side by a stone pier, formed into three shafts, with moulded bases and carved caps. The piers are carried on above these, corbelling out to form the ends of balcony. Each of these has the figure of an angel projecting boldly from the pier, one holding a harp, and the other an organ ... the first floor has a range of six windows coupled, with polished granite pillar dividing them, and deeply moulded circular arches and carved hood moulds. The pillars and jambs have moulded bases and carved caps ... [On the second floor] the centre window has a stone balcony, projecting on corbels, and with pierced panels and carved dados ... The carving throughout has been done by Mr. Mawer, of Great George Street. (Yorkshire Post and Leeds Intelligencer 10 March 1872)

Edward Archibald Ramsden's Park Row shop was passed to his son Archibald, and the firm continued into the 1950s. The building was demolished before 1960.

Media related to Ramsden premises Park Row Leeds 1874 at Wikimedia Commons

=== Former Kirkgate Market, Bradford, 1872 ===
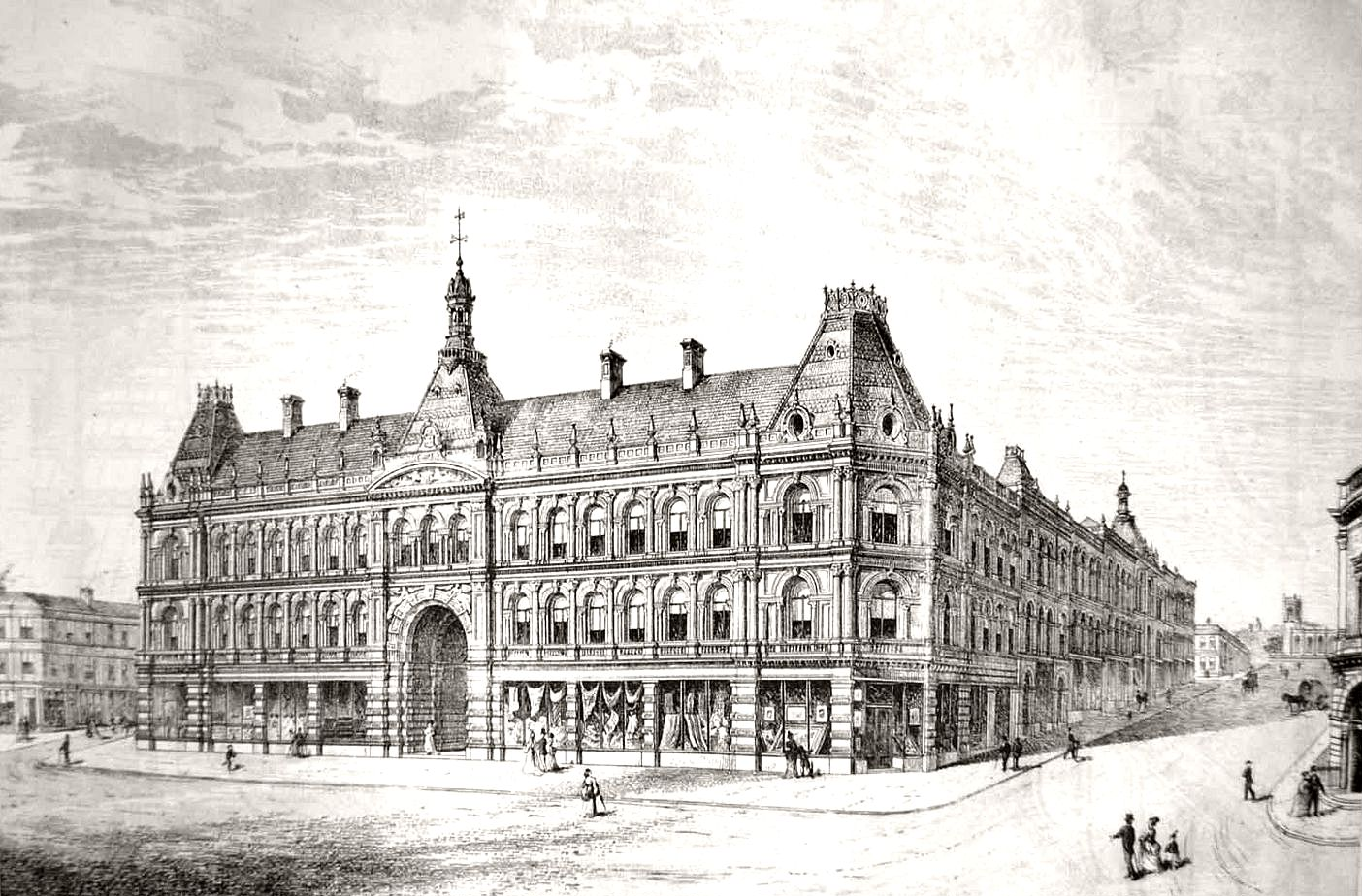
Kirkgate Market Bradford, 1872

Kirkgate Market Bradford was designed by Lockwood and Mawson for Bradford Corporation, and formally opened on Thursday 31 October 1872. It was demolished in 1973. In 1872 the Leeds Mercury reported: "It may be stated that Messrs. Mawer, of Leeds, are intrusted with the execution of the carved heads, Corinthian capitals and other work of this character at the New Market pile, and are doing their work in first-class style." The whole 180 foot frontage on Kirkgate contained carved decoration, to a height of 50 feet. The contracts for carving were given to "Mr. Keyworth, of London," for the spandrels over the main door representing Flora and Pomona, and to "Mr. Mawer, of Leeds" for the rest of the carving.

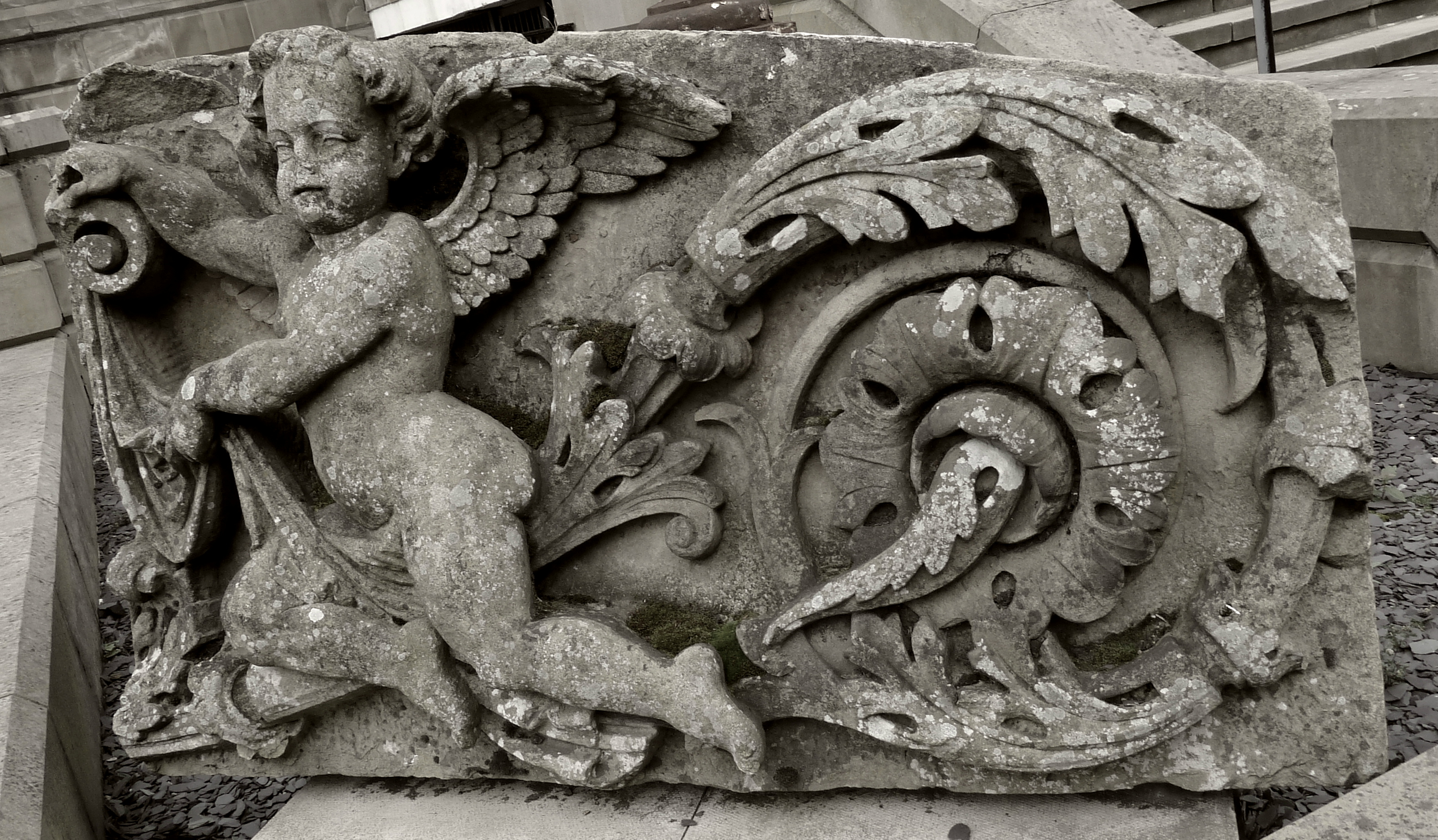
Carving from tympanum above entrance

In 1872, the Leeds Times reported:

"A tympanum in the gable [above the Flora and Pomona] bears the date of the building, 1871, with figures and ornamental foliage, and above that the Bradford arms and motto, Labor omni wincit ... The market stands in the rear of a fine classic facade, fronting Kirkgate ... the windows throughout are circular headed, with handsomely carved key-stones, together with clusters of columns with carved capitals." (Leeds Times 19 October 1872)

As of 2017, Bradford City Council retains possession of the carved stones from this building. In 2014 a number of the original carvings by Mawer and Keyworth were rediscovered in a compound in Bradford, and six of them were placed on display in front of Merchant's House, Peckover Street. The pieces include an "ornate apple tree" by William Day Keyworth junior. The rest, by Mawer, are a cherub, two voussoirs from the main entrance arch, a capital, and a garland.

Media related to Kirkgate Market, Bradford at Wikimedia Commons

=== Former St Bartholomew, Ripleyville, Bradford, 1871–1872 ===
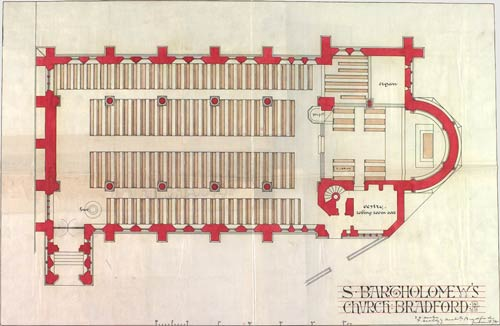
Plan of St Bartholomew's, showing positions of pulpit and font

St Bartholomew's, in Hall Lane, Ripleyville, Bradford, West Yorkshire, was designed by TH and F Healey of Bradford. The foundation stone was laid on 10 April 1871, and the church was consecrated on 10 December 1872, when the spire was still unfinished. It was not completed until 1874. Henry William Ripley, who created Ripleyville, contributed the site. The church was demolished around 1965, and the present location of the pulpit and font is unknown. The building was designed in the "Gothic style of architecture." In 1872 the Yorkshire Post and Leeds Intelligencer reported: "The upper part of the pulpit and the font are of Caen stone, designed by Mr. Mawer of Leeds." The Leeds Times reported that the pulpit was of "neat design."

Media related to St Bartholomew Ripleyville at Wikimedia Commons

=== Former Church of St Mary the Virgin, Luddendenfoot, 1873 ===
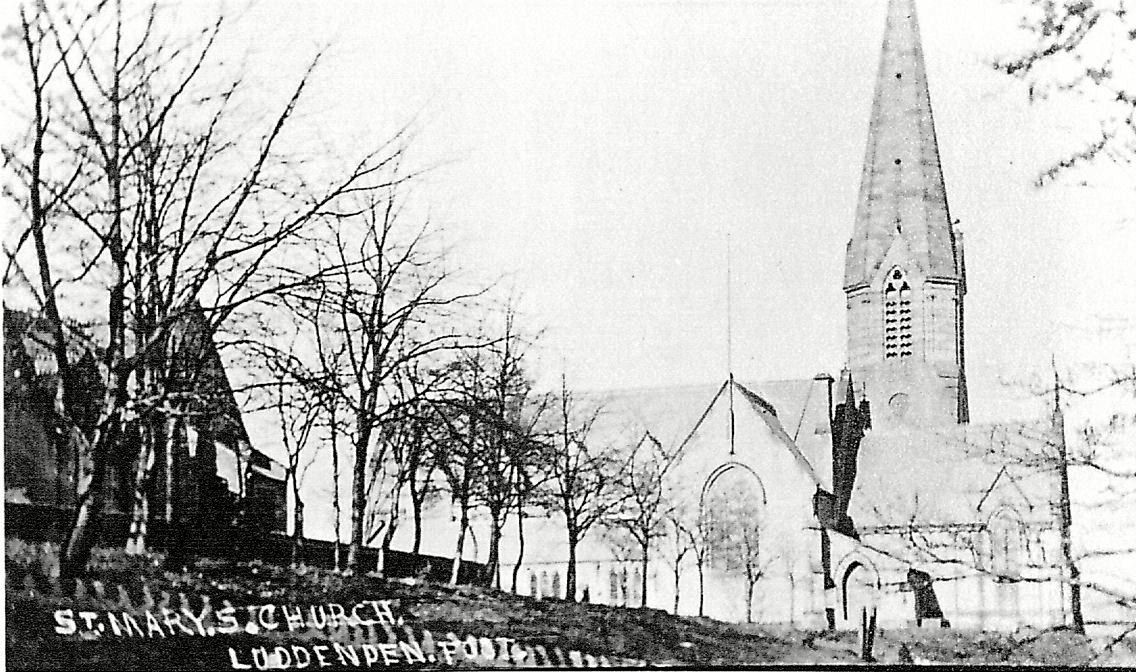
Former St Mary Luddendenfoot

The former Church of St Mary, Luddendenfoot, was designed by architects Parr & Strong of Cannon St, London, and consecrated on Saturday 3 May 1873. The building was demolished in 1970s; there are now houses on the site. (The current St Mary the Virgin Luddenden does not appear to have any items from the previous church.)

"The font is in Caen stone, and has a single shaft with carved capital and an octagonal bowl. This font is supplied with water from a spring in the steep bank that rises a few yards from the west end, and can be turned on any time. The pulpit is richly treated. It stands on a base of marble and is in Caen stone - six sides of the octagon being shown, and being richly diapered. In the centre is the crowned head of St Mary within a circle. The arcading is in dwarf shafts of black marble. Messrs Mawer of Leeds have worked the Caen stone."

The same newspaper adds that: "The corbel on either side [of the chancel arch] is the figure of an angel with an open book. The inner side of the arch rests on shafts of red sandstone, with richly carved capitals." Four of the faces of the octagonal stage of the tower were "finished in dressed stone with moulded shafts and carved capitals at the angles." No attribution is given for this stone carving work, which could possibly have been carried out by Charles Mawer.

Media related to Former St Mary the Virgin Luddendenfoot at Wikimedia Commons

=== Chesterfield Parish Church of St Mary and All Saints, Derbyshire, 1874 ===
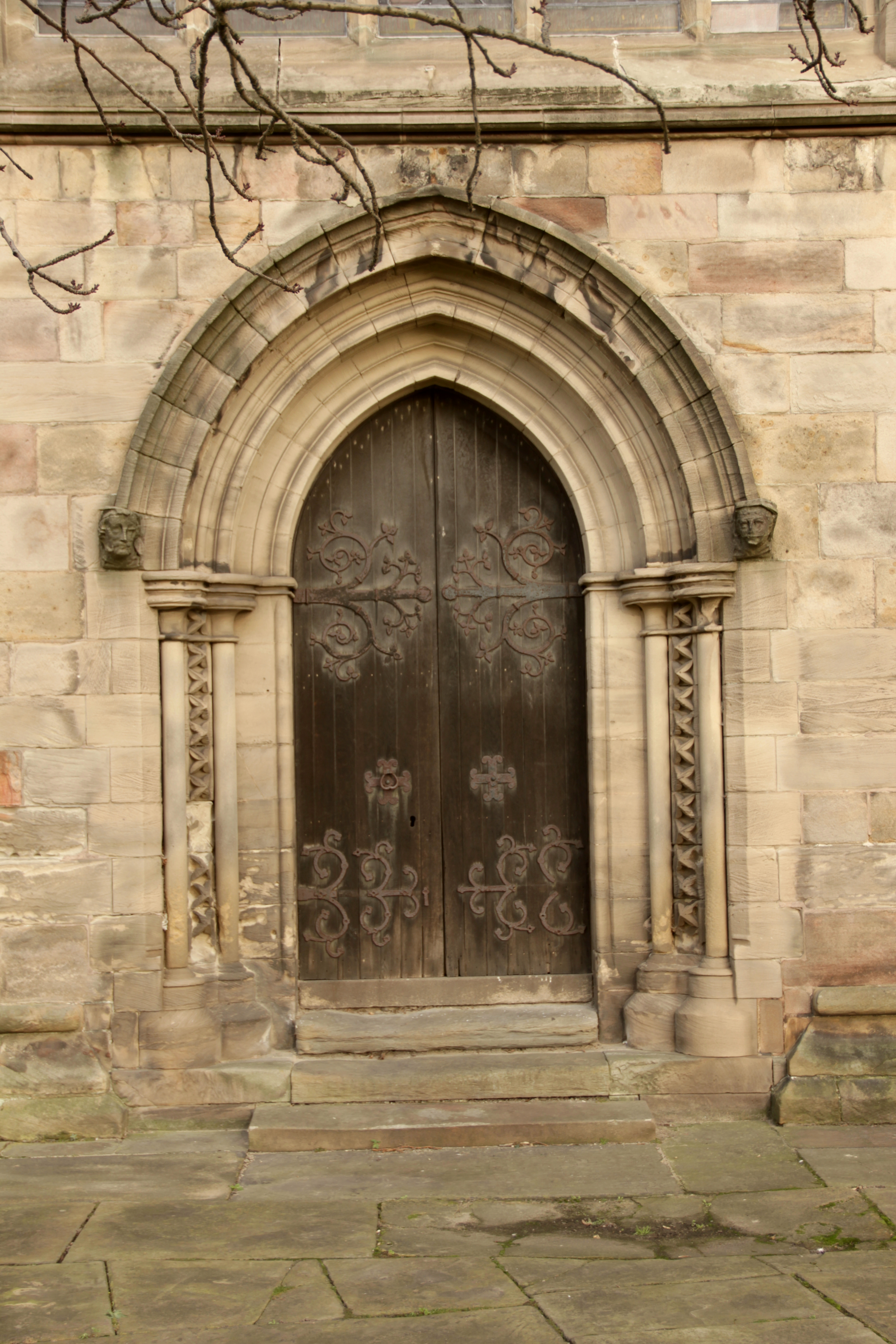
South transept door

This is a 14th-century Grade I listed building. In 1874 the south transept was restored in order to fit a memorial window dedicated to Edward Walker. During the restoration, a Georgian addition was removed, exposing an Early English doorway, described by the Derbyshire Courier thus:

"(The doorway was) ... so mutilated as to render the design almost beyond recognition ... Particular care has been taken to retain any original portion that happened to be sound and intact ... these portions were but few ... The doorway ... being composed of a richly-moulded arch upon two columns of Mansfield red stone; on either side and between the columns there is a filling of dog-tooth ornament similar to that upon the Early English portions of the interior of the church. The door is simply an old friend with a new face, being the old door recased, and upon which are a set of artistically-worked plate bands ... the carving by Mr. Mawer of Leeds; from the designs and under the superintendence of Mr. S. Rollinson, architect, of this town.(Derbyshire Courier, 15 August 1874)

Media related to Chesterfield Parish Church, south transept door at Wikimedia Commons
Media related to St Mary Chesterfield, label stops at Wikimedia Commons

=== Church of St Matthew, Lightcliffe, 1874–1875 ===
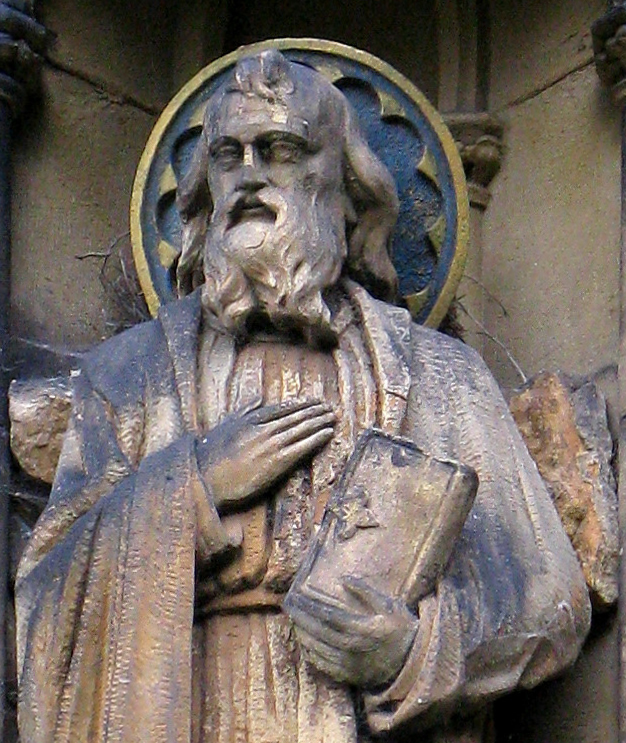
St Matthew by Charles Mawer

St Matthew, Lightcliffe, Halifax, West Yorkshire is a Grade II listed building. Between 1874 and 1875, in collaboration with architect William Swinden Barber, Charles produced the capitals and other carvings, but not the pulpit and reredos. The Yorkshire Post and Leeds Intelligencer reported in 1875:

[Indoors] "the braces to the chancel roof are supported on winged angels holding shields, which are charged with the emblems of the Passion ... [Outside on the tower], facing the high road, is the principal entrance door, with the well-known four-leaved flowers carved in the hollow of the jambs and arch, the hood mould is finished with the heads of king and bishop; over the doorway is a canopied niche in which is placed the figure of St. Matthew ... Mr. Charles Mawer has executed the carving in a most creditable manner." (Yorkshire Post and Leeds Intelligencer 22 September 1875)

Media related to St Matthew's Church, Lightcliffe at Wikimedia Commons

=== Pearson Brothers shop in New Briggate, Leeds, 1875 ===
No image of this building has been found, but there is a description in the Leeds Mercury, 1875:

"The building in the occupation of Messrs Pearson Brothers, by Mr George Corson ... The front of this building is in freestone and in four stages. The shop door and window is enclosed between massive piers with foliated caps, which carry a deeply moulded stilted round segmental arch, the inner member of which is semicircular. Over this is a triple semicircular-headed arcade containing sunk trefoil window heads borne by shafts with foliated caps, which rise from a projecting sill course. The second floor is lighted by three mullioned and transomed windows, with carved segmental heads. Beneath the gable is a triplet of square-headed lights with shafts and moulded caps, surmounted by an obtusely-pointed label mould, enclosing a circular light in the tympanum and sunk enrichment. The front is banded across by projecting courses at the sill and floor levels, and terminates in a steeply-pitched gable. Mr Smith executed the masonry, and Mr Charles Mawer, of Leeds, the carved details ... All the above-named buildings are of stone from the neighbourhood.

Media related to New Briggate, archive images at Wikimedia Commons

=== Church of St Thomas the Apostle, Killinghall, 1879-1880 ===
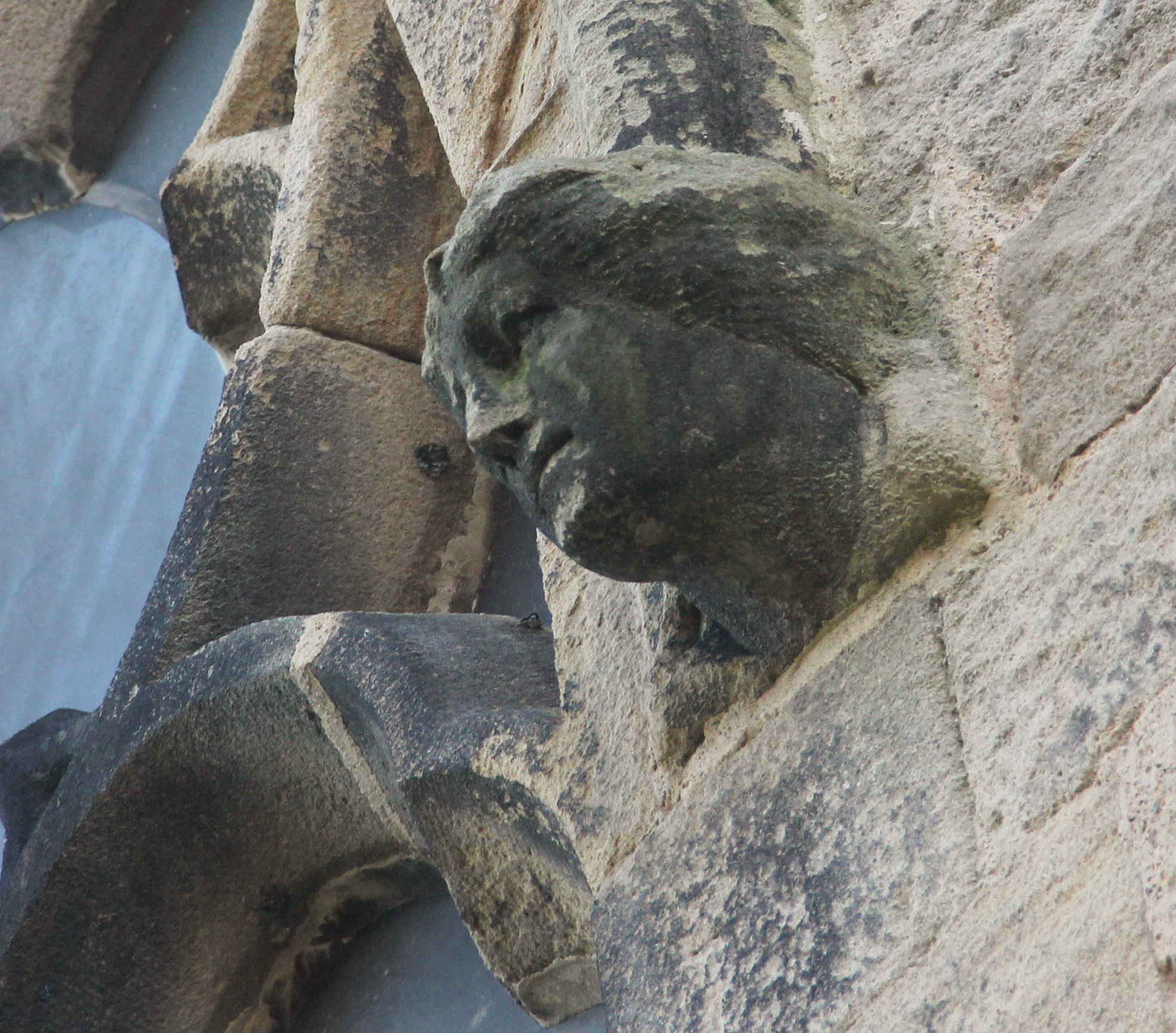
Label stop head on exterior

St Thomas Killinghall is an unlisted building, designed by William Swinden Barber. The foundation stone was laid on Saturday 26 May 1879, and the church was consecrated on Thursday 29 July 1880. Its architectural sculpture, pulpit and font are the last known works of Charles Mawer.

"The font and the pulpit are of Caen stone, the former is the gift of Lady Ingilby, and is placed near the western entrance. Both of these necessary adjuncts to the Church service have been executed by Mr. Charles Mawer, of Leeds, and the few bosses and band of foliage introduced in the design are carried with great spirit and a faithful following after old examples."(Pateley Bridge & Nidderdale Herald 31 July 1880)

Media related to St. Thomas the Apostle, Killinghall, North Yorkshire at Wikimedia Commons

== Works for Mawer and Payler ==
=== Bradford Old Bank Company, Harrogate, 1885 ===
This former Bradford Old Bank Company building probably no longer exists. It was originally occupied by a bank, and the address was at the junction of James Street and Princes street in Harrogate, North Yorkshire. It was designed by architects H.E. and A Bown of Harrogate. In 1885 the Knaresborough Post described the building as follows:

The front, which is executed in cleansed fine grit sandstone of a uniform light yellow tint, from Messrs. King & Co.'s Moorhouse Quarries at Pateley Bridge, is in the Italian Renaissance or Free Classic, the lower order being Roman Ionic, and the upper one which runs through two stories Roman composite, the bank part is emphasized by composite fluted and reeded pilasters, a central tower finished with ornamental ironwork, and attic pediment, with boldly carved tympanum ... carvers, Messrs. Mawer and Paylor, Leeds.

== See also ==
- Robert Mawer
- Catherine Mawer
- Benjamin Payler
- Matthew Taylor (sculptor)
- Benjamin Burstall
- Mawer and Ingle
- William Ingle
