= John Wormald Appleyard =

British artist (1831–1894)

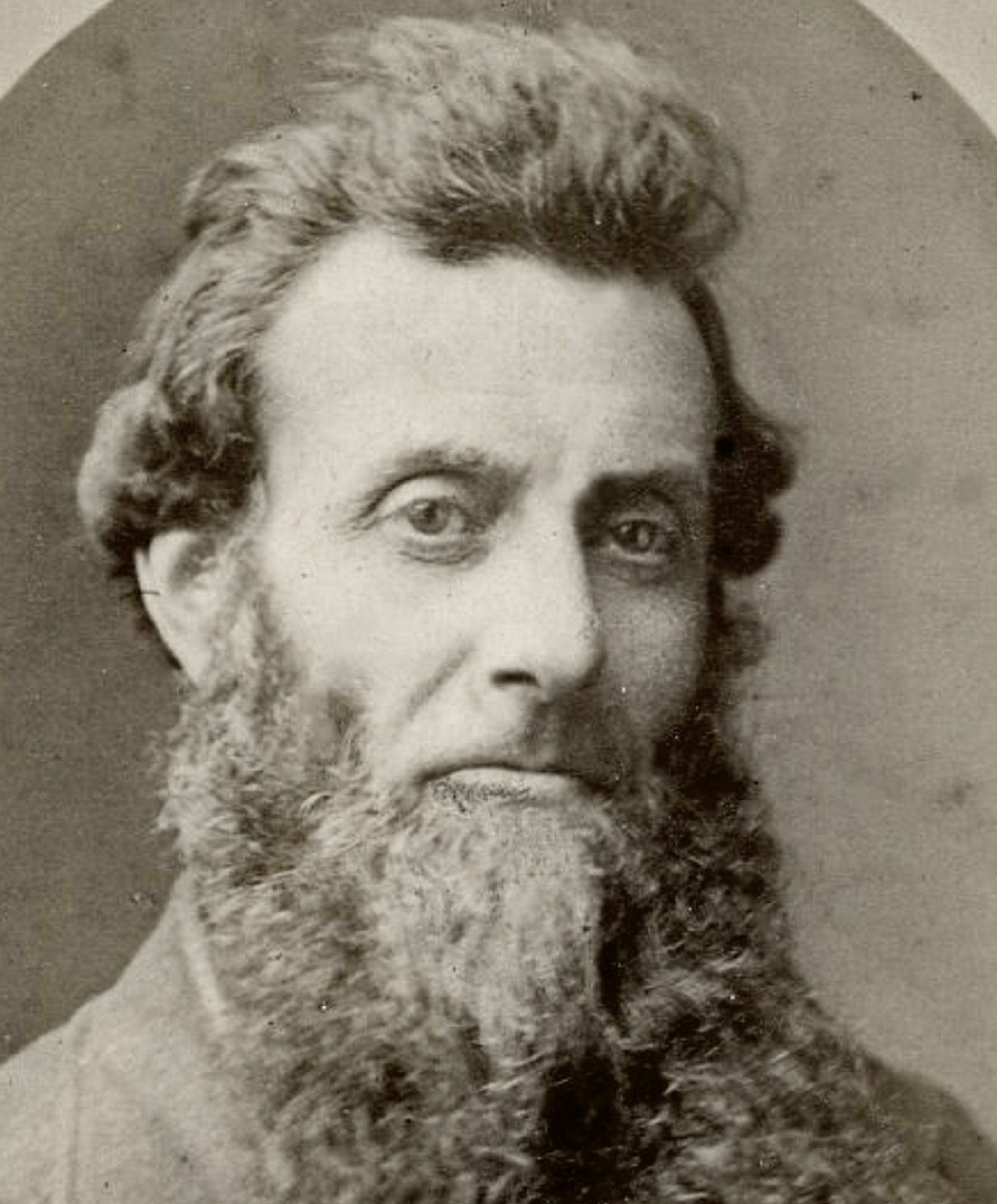
- Appleyard, in the 1880s
- Born: 10 September 1831; School Close, Leeds, England
- Died: 14 January 1894 (aged 62); Leeds
- Resting place: Beckett Street Cemetery
- Education: Apprenticed to Abraham Wormald, stonemason
- Known for: Wood and stone carving
- Notable work: Old Father Time, 1872 on Time Ball Buildings; Ivanhoe clock figures, 1878, in Thornton's Arcade, Leeds; Interior carving, 1884, in Leeds Central Library
- Style: Theatrical
- Spouse: Elizabeth "Eliza" Whiteley
- Memorials: Appleyard window in St John's Church, Farsley

John Wormald Appleyard (10 September 1831 – 14 January 1894) (active 1851–1893) was a British sculptor and monumental mason based in Leeds, West Yorkshire, England.

He was sixteen years old when his apprenticeship as a stone carver was curtailed due to the death of his grandfather who was training him. He was versatile enough to turn his hand to wood carving, decorative ceiling work, stained glass and marble sculpture besides stone carving, so that from around the age of twenty-one years he was able to maintain a stoneyard and studio in Cookridge Street, Leeds, at least until 1891. He was generally known during his lifetime as a monumental mason.

He is mainly known today in Leeds for his wooden faux-Jacquemart figures of Robin Hood, Friar Tuck, Richard the Lionheart and the swineherd Gurth, which appear to strike the hours on the Ivanhoe clock at one end of Thornton's Arcade in Briggate. He is also known for his figure of Old Father Time on the Tempus Fugit clock on the Time Ball Buildings, Leeds.

== Background ==
Appleyard's maternal grandparents, both born in Yorkshire, were Abraham Wormald, (Note: Abraham Wormald (ca.1786–1847). GRO index: Deaths Jun 1847 Wormald Abraham Bradford Yk 23 133) a stonemason of Spring Gardens, Drighlington, and his wife Elizabeth. (Note: Elizabeth Wormald (ca.1781 – Drighlington 20 February 1848). GRO index: Deaths Mar 1848 Wormald Elizabeth Bradford 23 121) His father was Jabez Appleyard, (Note: Jabez Appleyard (Birstall 1805 – Bradford 5 December 1870). GRO index: Deaths Sep 1870 Appleyard Jabez 64 Bradford, Yorks 9b 183) a size-boiler for the preparation of wool, and his mother was Jane Wormald. (Note: Jane Wormald (Birstall 1810 – 30 January 1883). GRO index: Deaths Mar 1883 Appleyard Jane 73 Bradford Yorks 9b 172). Jabez and Jane had nine children. John, the eldest, was born on 10 September 1831 at School Close, Leeds, and baptised on 9 October 1831 at St Peter's, Leeds. The family moved to Drighlington, then Water Lane in Farsley. By 1851, after completing his apprenticeship with his grandfather, he moved to 4 Hirst Square off St James Street, Leeds, on the site of the present Leeds Civic Hall, and lived there for the rest of his life. On 20 October 1853 he married the widow Mrs Elizabeth "Eliza" Whiteley by licence at Leeds Parish Church. (Note: Mrs Elizabeth "Eliza" Whiteley (Foleshill 1824 – Leeds 1889). GRO index: Deaths Sep 1889 Appleyard Eliza 65 Leeds 9b 358. Marriages Dec 1853 Appleyard John Wormald, and Eliza Whiteley Leeds 9b 412.)

Appleyard died on 14 January 1894 without issue, (Note: John Wormald Appleyard (10 September 1831 – 14 January 1894). GRO index: Deaths Mar 1894 Appleyard John Wormald 62 Leeds 9b 317) The funeral procession left 4 Hirst Square on 17 January at 2.30 pm, and he was buried at Burmantofts Cemetery in grave no.12542. (Note: Burmantofts Cemetery is also known as Beckett Street Cemetery or Leeds Burial Ground. For images of the gravestones of Appleyard's family, see: Category:St John Farsley, Appleyard gravestone, and Category:Beckett Street Cemetery, John Wormald Appleyard gravestone.) He was sufficiently wealthy to bequeath £100 (equivalent to £11,237.74 in 2025) to Leeds General Infirmary, and £2,133 16s 10d (equivalent to £239,796.49 in 2025) to his relative Isaac Appleyard, a coal merchant. His effects, consisting of "china, books, pictures, and other effects" were auctioned at Hepper & Sons, Leeds, on 3 February 1894.

He was the uncle of the artist Fred Appleyard, via Appleyard's brother Isaac. (Note: Isaac Appleyard (1843–1898).)

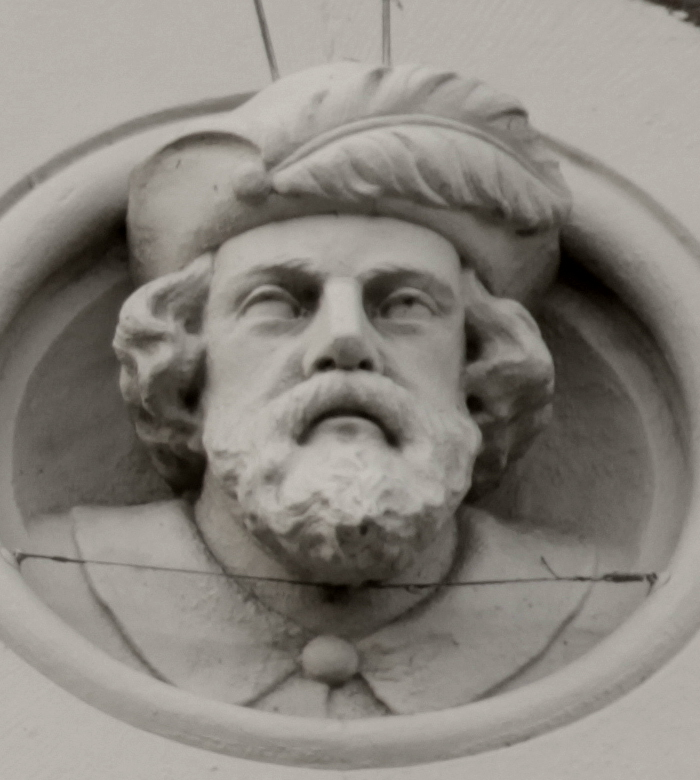
John Wormald Appleyard by Benjamin Payler, 1878 (photographed from below)

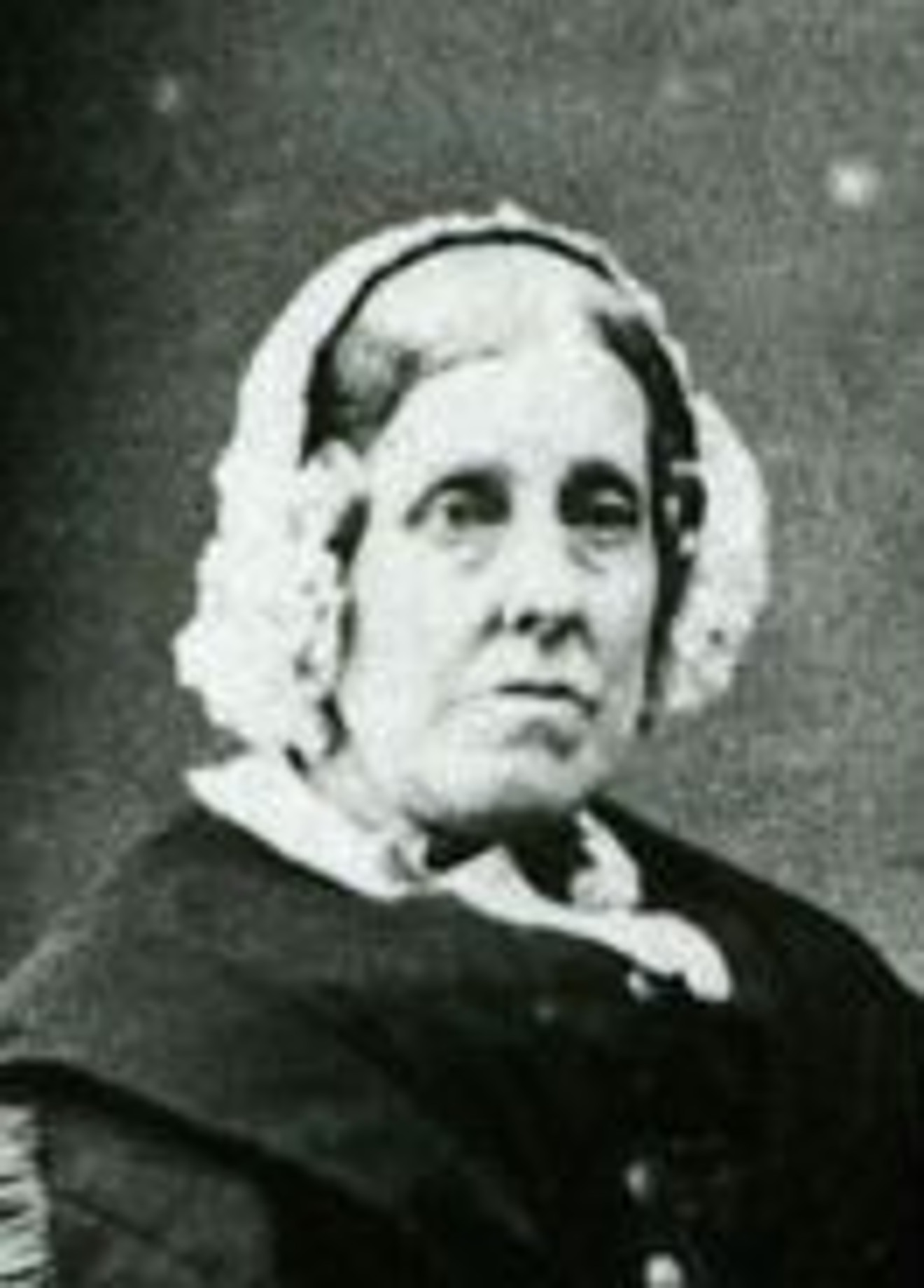
Jane Appleyard, 1860s

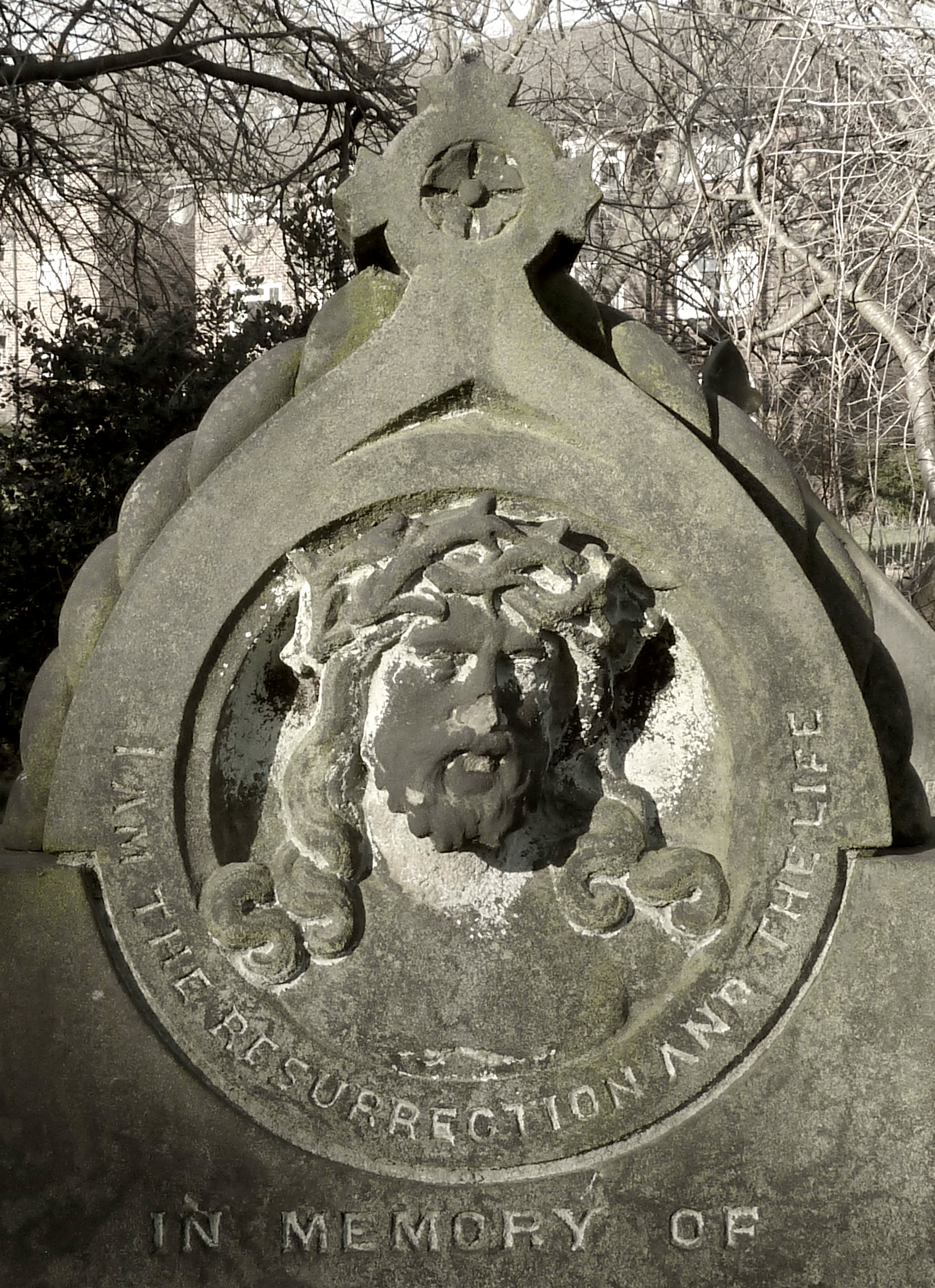
Head of Christ on family gravestone, 1863, probably carved by J.W. Appleyard

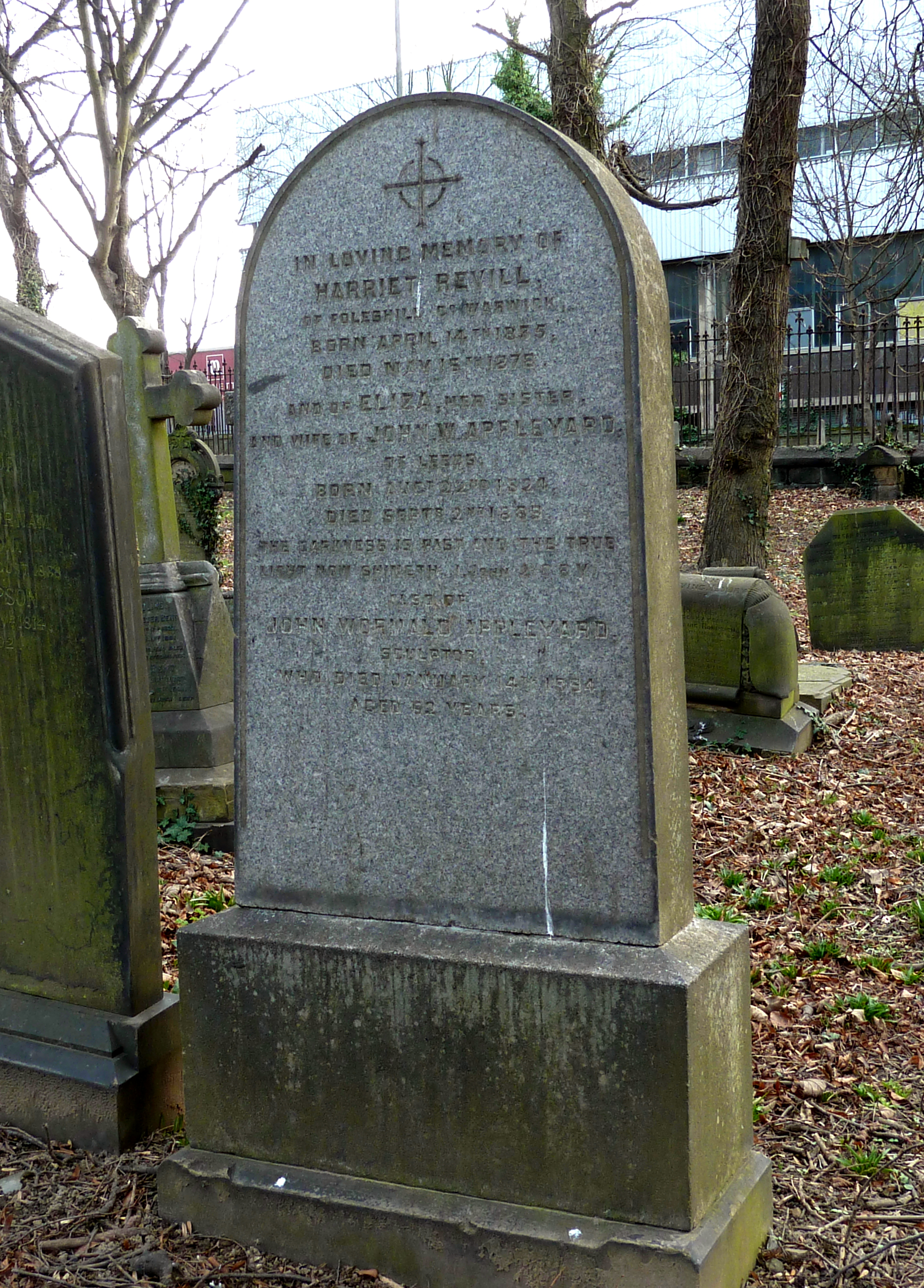
Grave of John Wormald Appleyard, died 1894

== Career ==
In 1841, by the time he was nine years old, Appleyard was already apprenticed in Drighlington to his maternal grandfather Abraham Wormald, a stonemason. At this yard he was permitted to concentrate on carving. His grandfather's death in 1847 curtailed his apprenticeship at the age of 16, and he was back with his parents in Farsley by 1851, when he was 19 years old and already calling himself a "stone carver and cutter." He plied his trade as a "sculptor, stone and marble mason and monumental mason" until at least 1891, although he tended to call himself simply a stone carver or sculptor.

In 1892 Appleyard appeared as a witness, on behalf of architect Edward William Lockwood (1856–1934) of Huddersfield, in a Court case brought by sculptor Samuel Auty of Lindley for payment for some carving work on the factory of dry salters Clayton, Holroyd & Co., Longroyd Lane, off Manchester Road, Longroyd Bridge, Huddersfield, built 1890–1891 (now demolished). A comment from this case confirms that stones for architectural carving were roughed out by masons at ground level, and that the carving was completed when the stones were in situ on the building: "The stone for the gargoyles [was] roughened into shape," then later "he could not work in such an exposed position as that in which the stone had in the meantime been placed, but that when the weather was better he would finish the work." Auty did not finish it, and Appleyard completed the six crockets and two gargoyles. Both sculptors were paid for their work.

The Beckett Street Cemetery record keeper knew him as a monumental mason. By 1871 he had a workshop producing sculpture and designs in 16–18 Cookridge Street, Leeds, next door to architect George Corson, and he remained there as a monumental mason until at least 1891. Appleyard was also in his later years a teacher of cabinet-making at the Leeds Institute. He was a leading member of Leeds Church Institute.

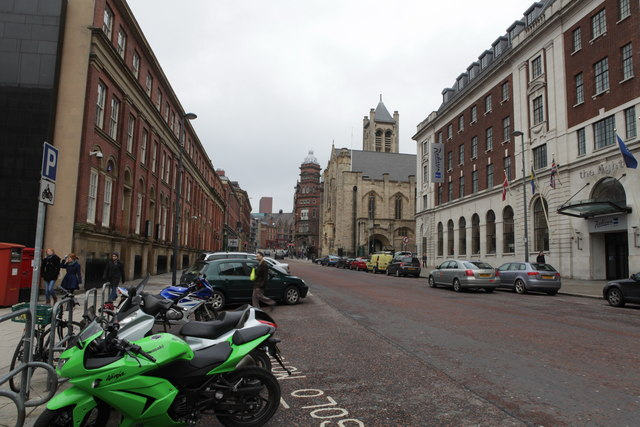
Cookridge Street, Leeds, in 2010. On the left are nos.19–21, so Appleyard's studio at nos.16–18 was probably on the site of The Light, right

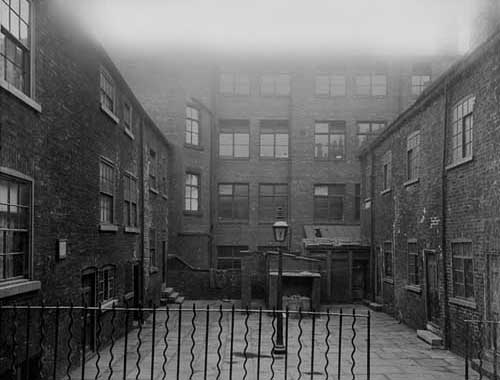
Hirst Square, Leeds, in 1913. This is where Appleyard lived, at number 4

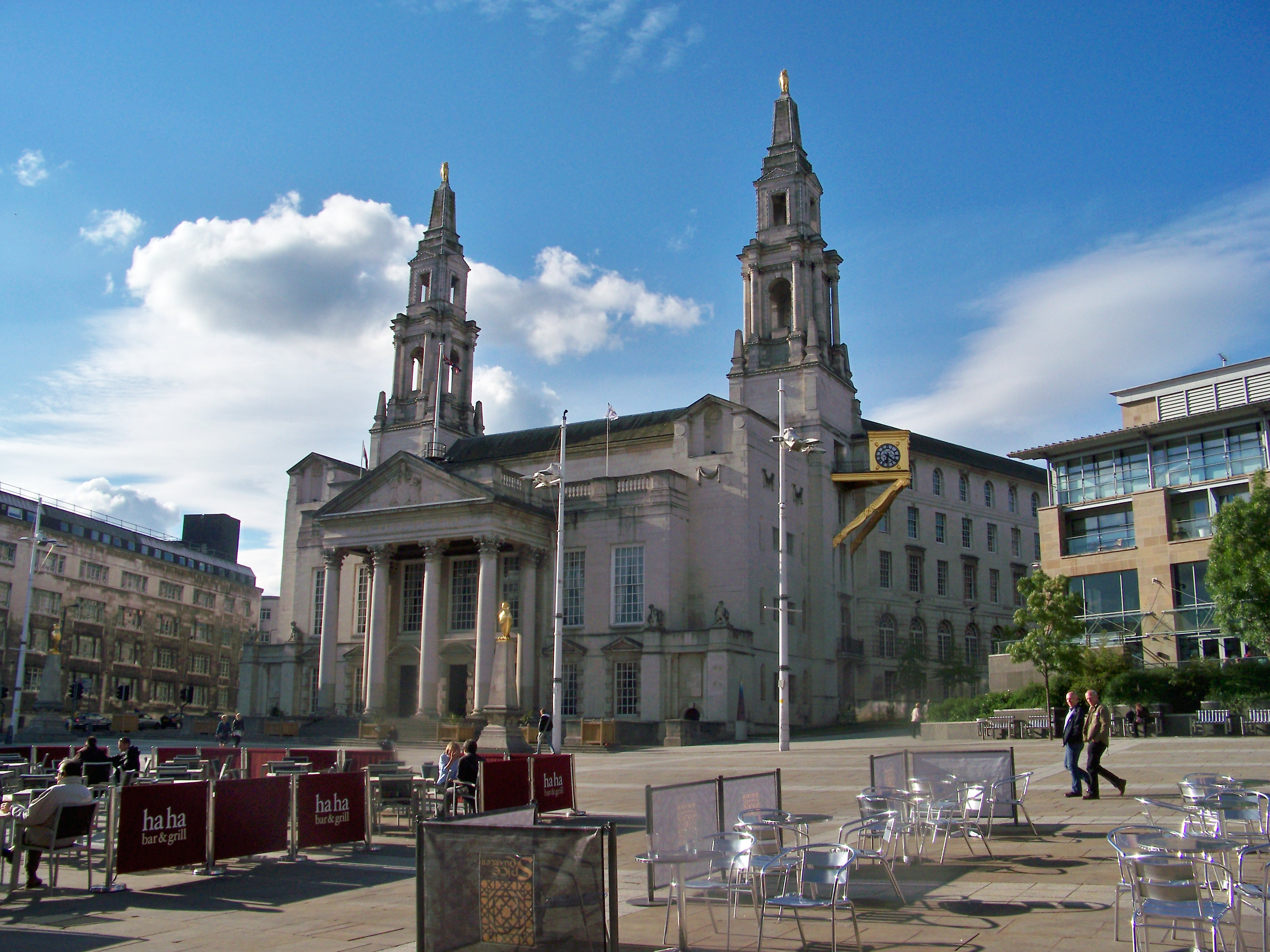
Leeds Civic Hall was built in 1933 on the site of Appleyard's home, 4 Hirst Square

== Works ==
=== Exhibitions, 1875–1891 ===
The whereabouts of the following exhibits is unknown. At the Leeds Mechanics' Institution, Yorkshire Exhibition of Arts and Manufactures in 1875 Appleyard exhibited "several marble sculptures." At the Yorkshire Fine Art Society, Autumn Exhibition, 1880, he showed Sabrina. In 1888 he exhibited unknown works alongside Matthew Taylor at a show of international works of art, in the central court, at the Leeds Fine Art Gallery exhibition. In 1889 he entered a Medallion Portrait of Lady Jane Grey at the Leeds City Art Gallery, The Spring Exhibition. His The Elements was exhibited at the same spring exhibition in 1890, and again in spring 1891. Other exhibited pieces were Head of Christ, (Note: This Head of Christ may be the clay model for the 1863 stone sculpture on the Appleyard gravestone.) Neptune, Portrait, Medallion Portrait of Mozart and Head of Mozart 1880.

=== Old Father Time figure, Time Ball Buildings, Leeds, after 1872 ===
This is part of a Grade II* listed building. Appleyard executed the sculpture on top of Dyson's cantilevered Tempus Fugit 'drum' clock, which is suspended from the front of the Time Ball Buildings, Leeds. The figure of Chronos or Old Father Time above the clock was created by Appleyard after Dyson bought 24 Briggate to add to the existing premises made from amalgamating 25 and 26 Briggate. (The date 1865 refers to the founding of Dyson's business.) (Note: Closeups of this century-old sculpture show a fresh-looking, smooth and glossy surface, which raises the question as to whether it has been heavily restored, or even replaced with a replica made of fibreglass or similar.) When Susan Wrathmell wrote the Pevsner Guide to Leeds, the Old Father Time figure was gilded. (Note: For images of the Old Father Time figure, see: Category:Time Ball Buildings, Old Father Time statue.)

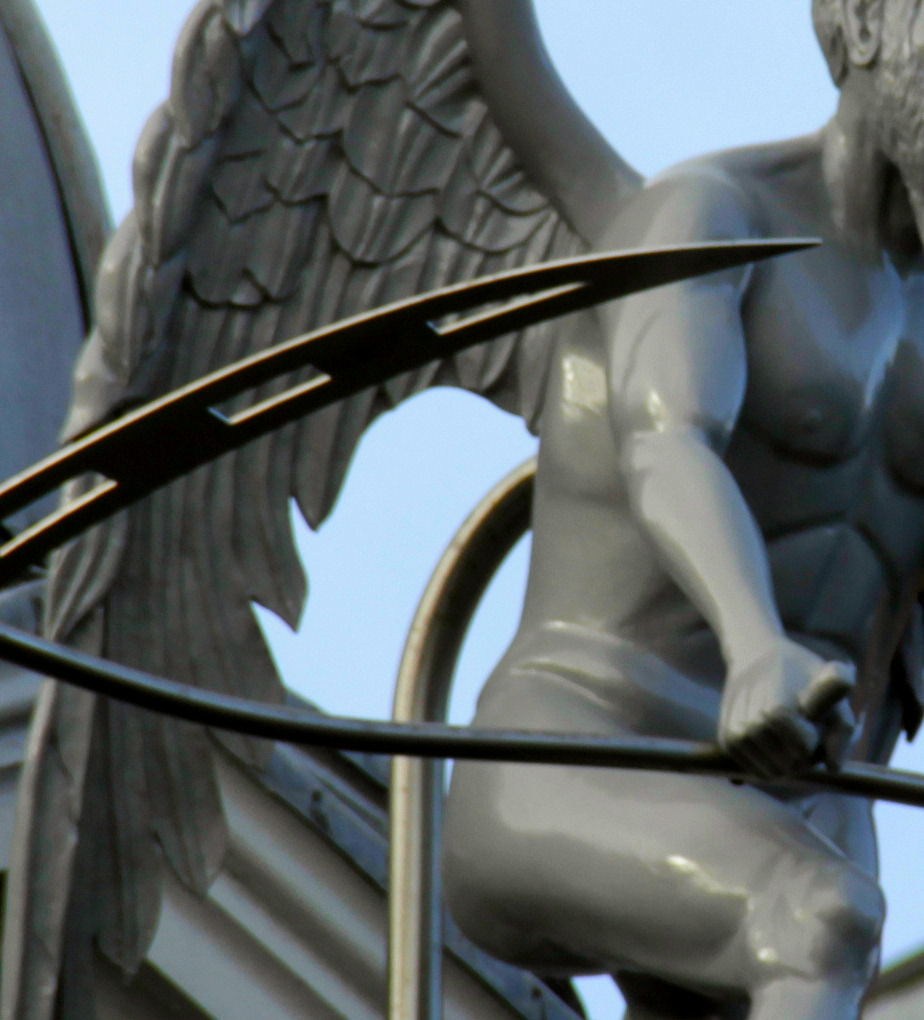
Close-up

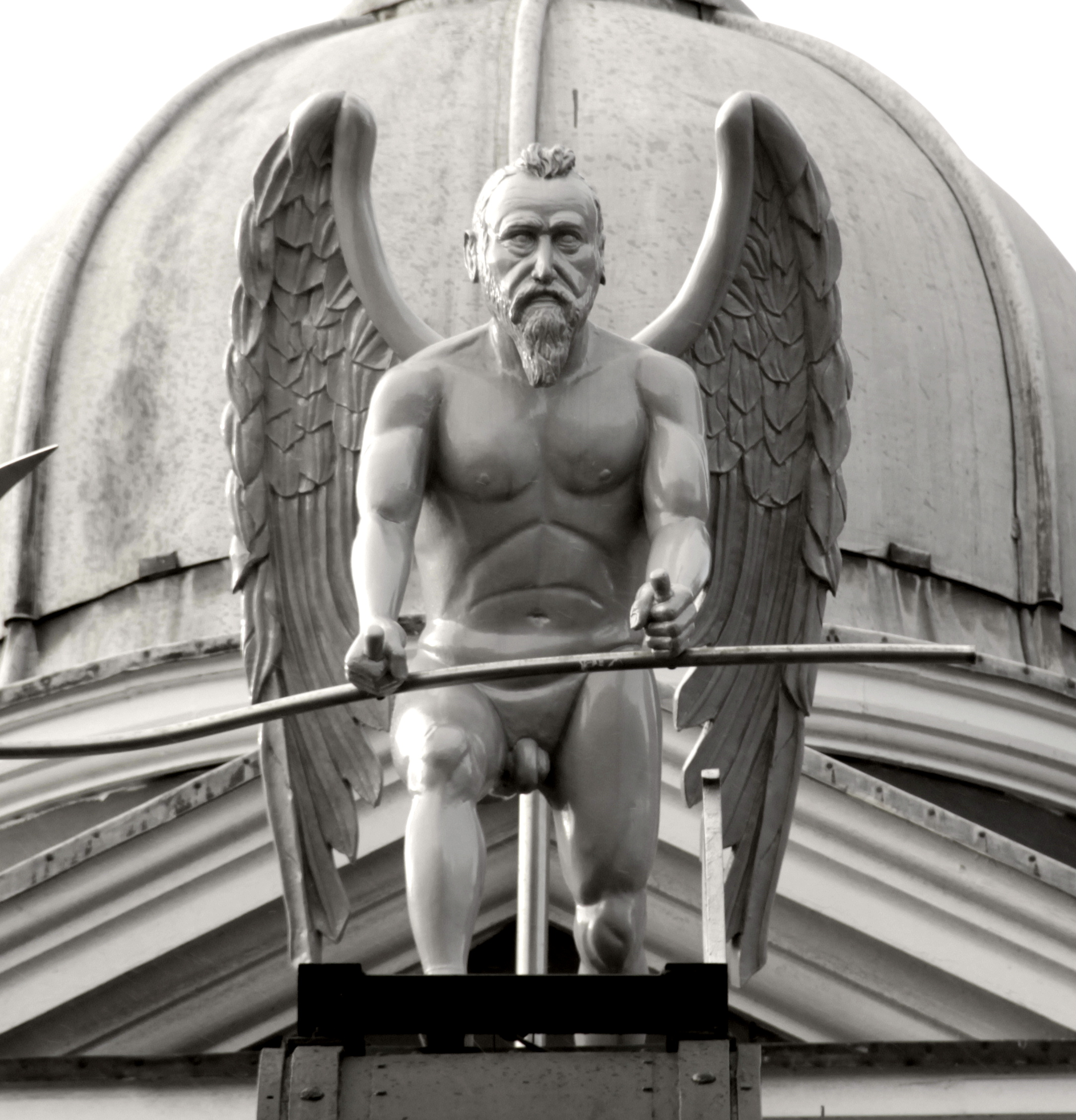
Old Father Time, 1872

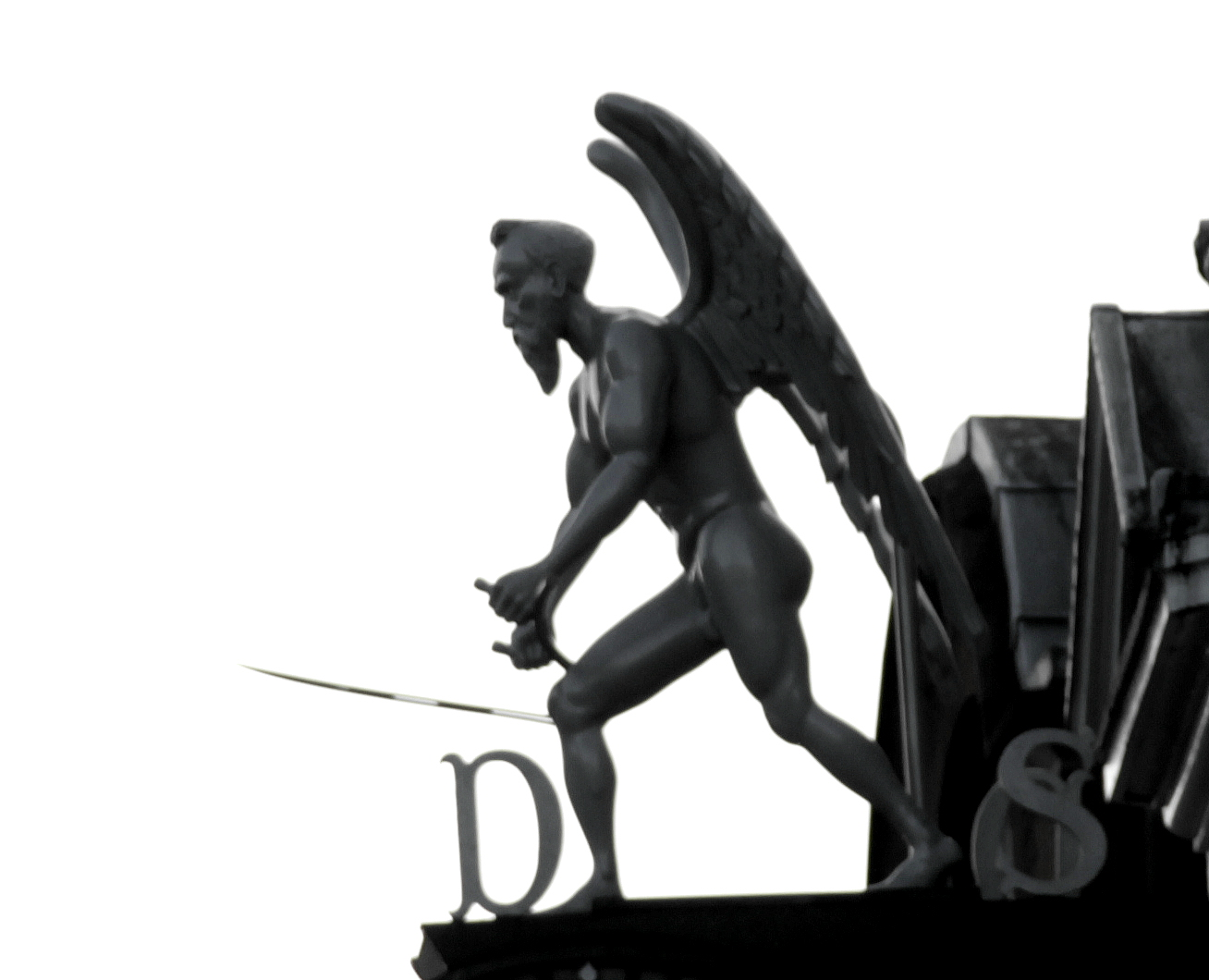
Silhouette

=== Head of Inigo Jones, c.1876 ===
Appleyard carved the head of Inigo Jones and some decorative panels for a wooden plaque dedicated to the Leeds Architectural Association (now West Yorkshire Society of Architects or WYSA), which was founded by George Corson and others on 14 December 1876, in the Philosophical Hall, Leeds. The head was inspired by the Van Dyck drawing of Inigo Jones. (Note: For images of the Head of Inigo Jones, see: Category:Head of Inigo Jones by JW Appleyard.)

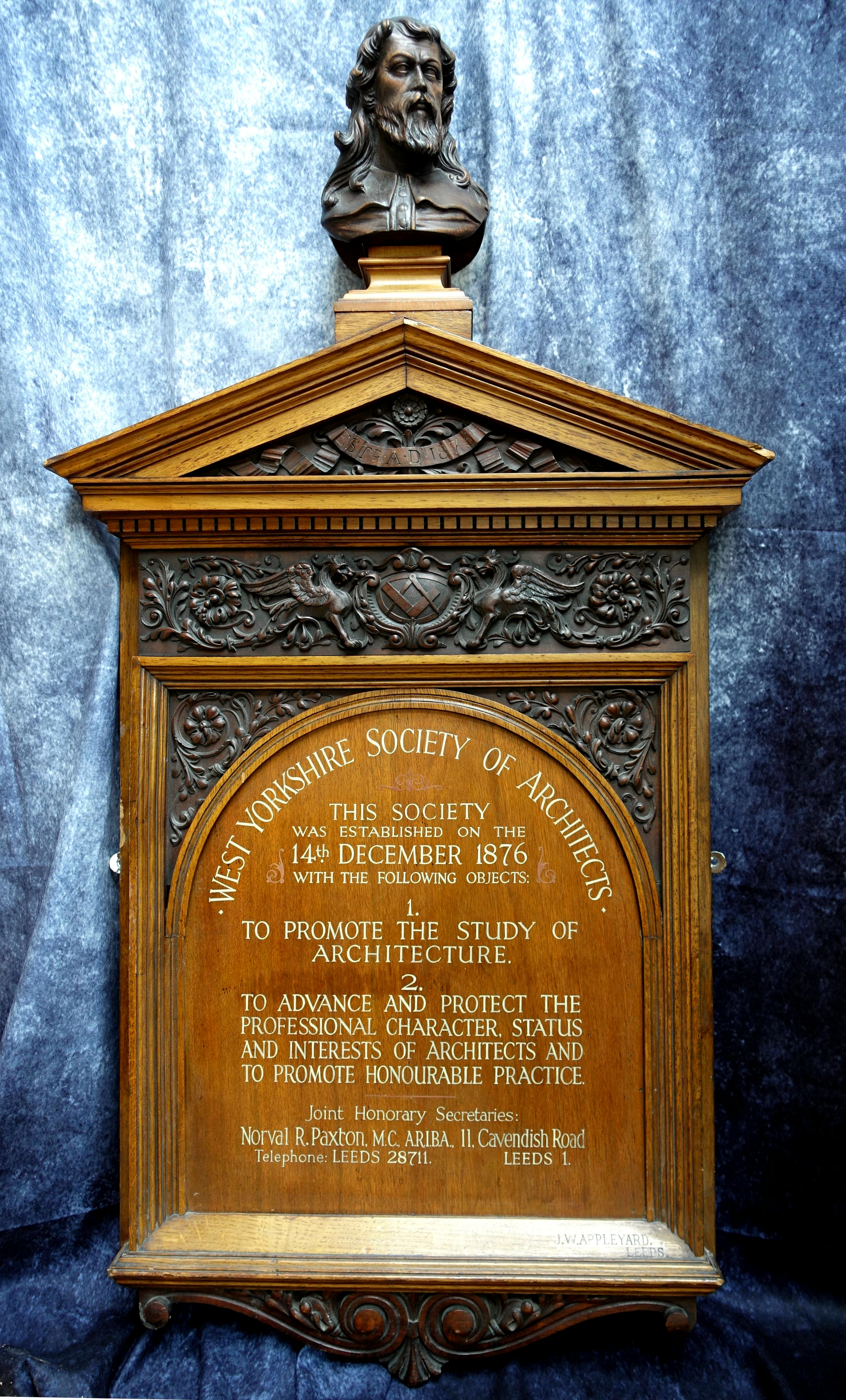
WYSA plaque, c.1876

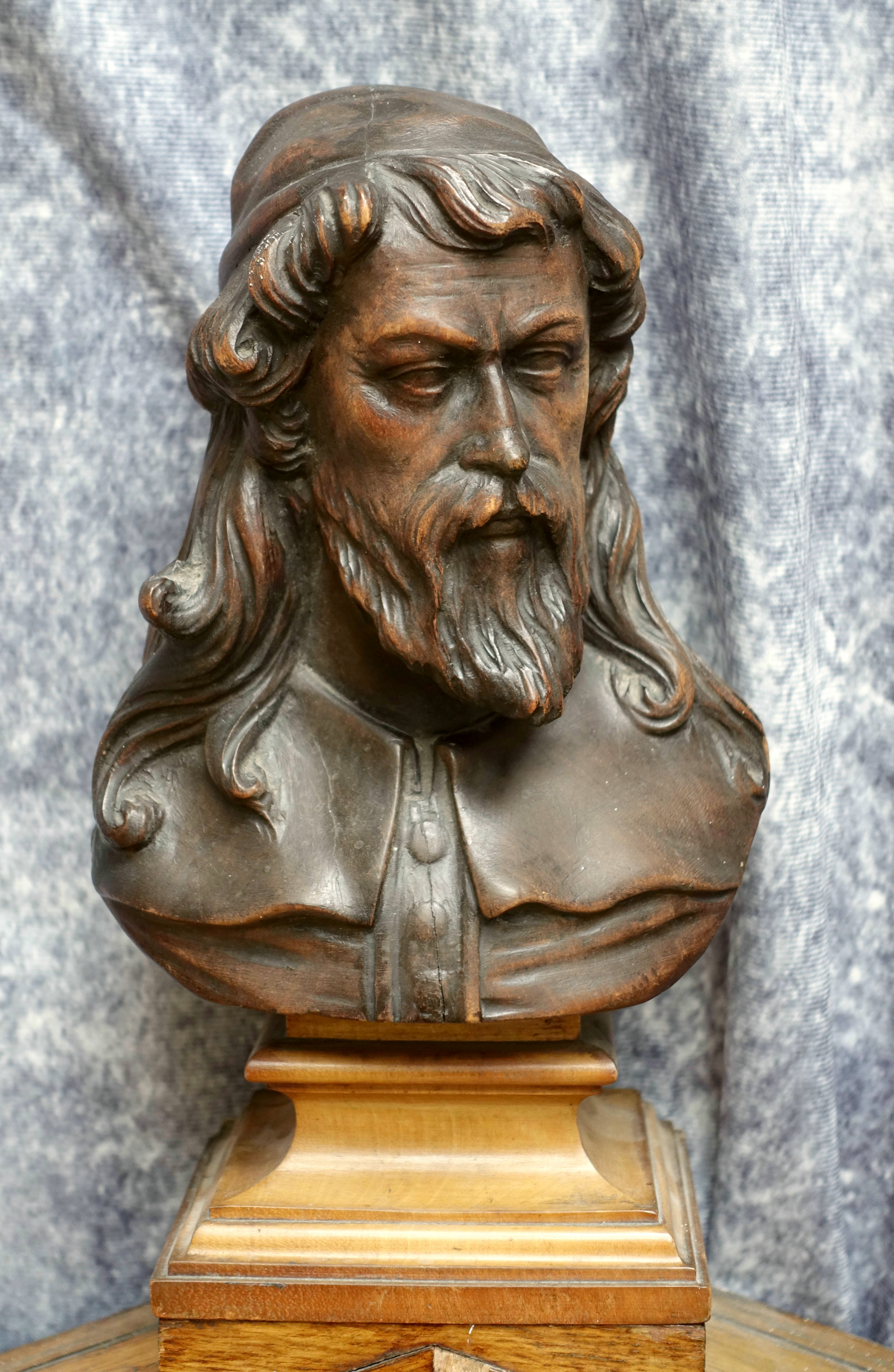
Head of Inigo Jones c.1876

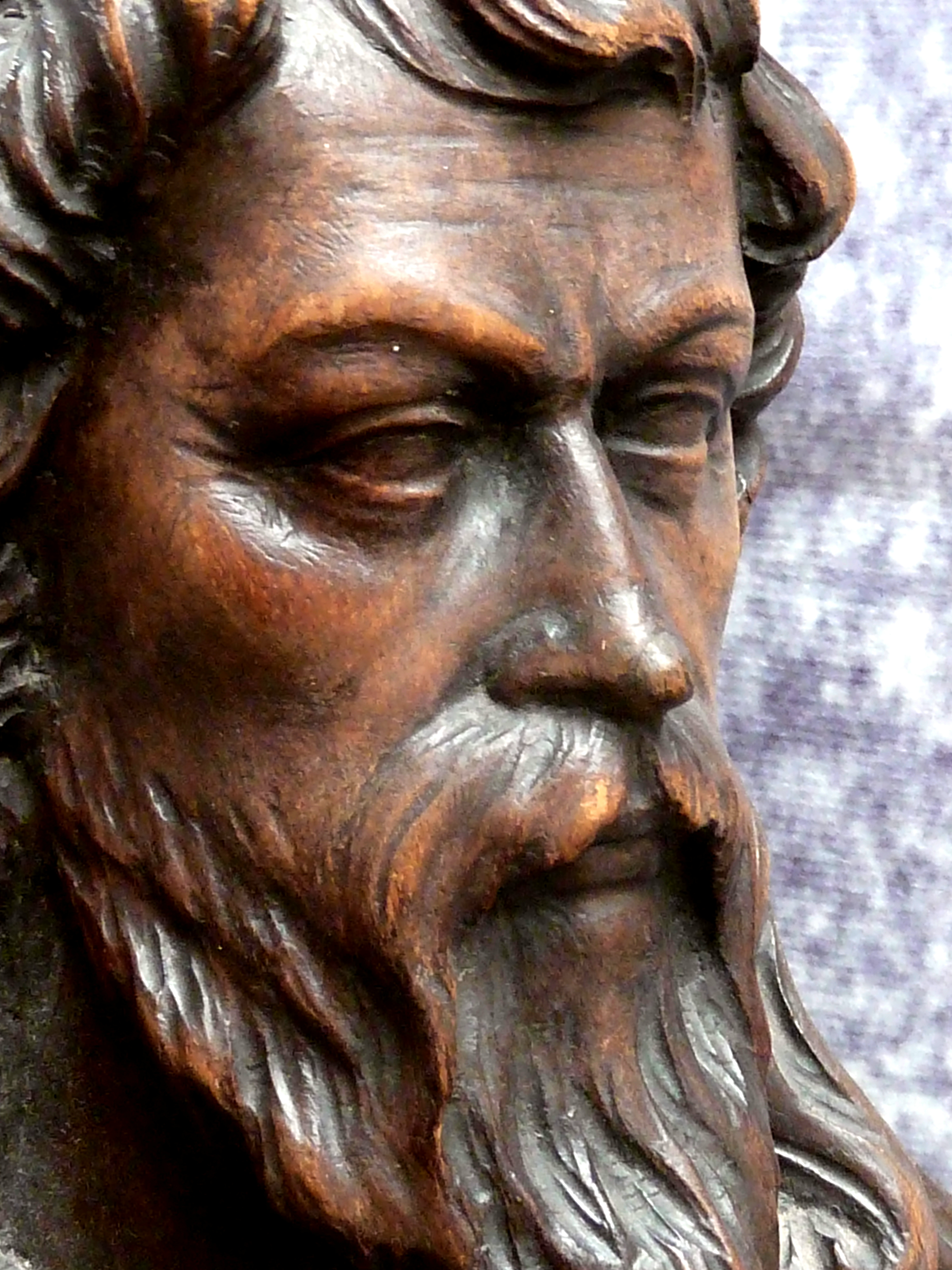
Head of Inigo Jones, c.1876

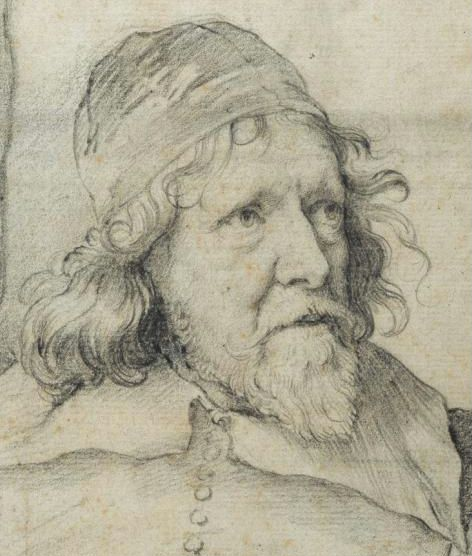
Appleyard's inspiration: Inigo Jones by Anthony van Dyck, 1630s

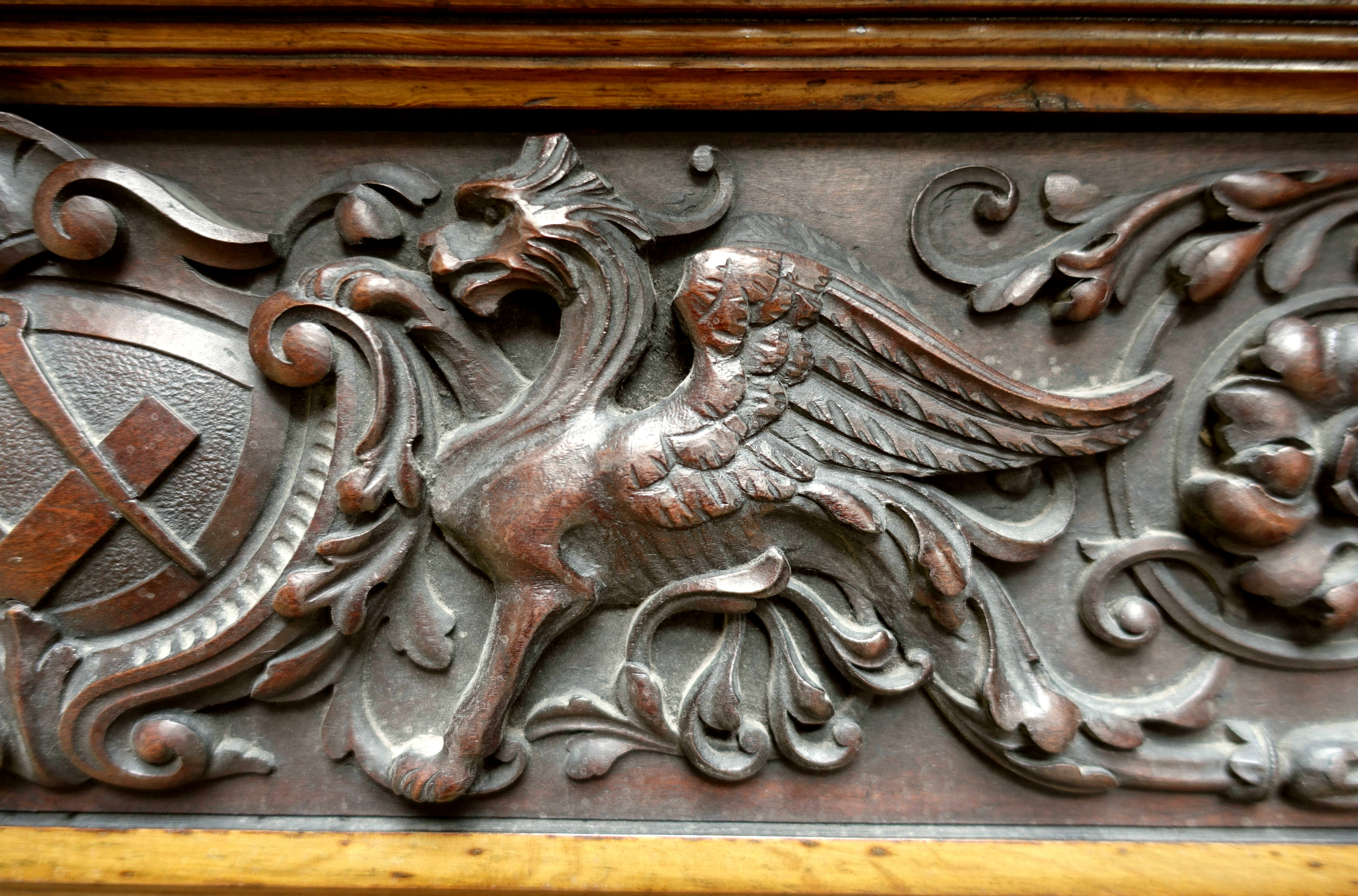
Gryphon on WYSA plaque, c.1876

=== St Bartholomew's Church, Armley, Leeds, 1872–1877 ===
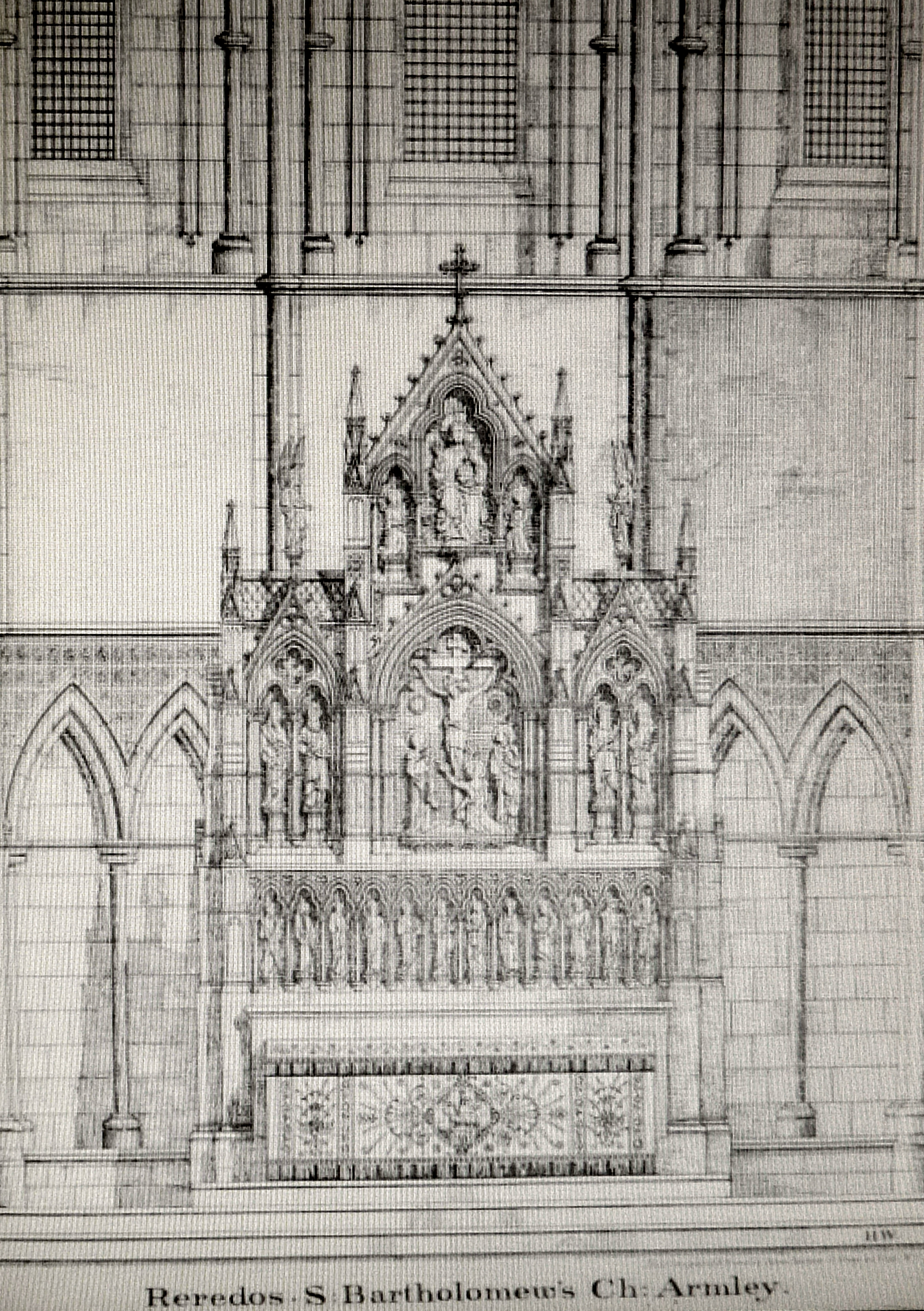
Design for reredos, St Bartholomew's 1874

St Bartholomew's, Armley, Leeds, was founded in 1872, and consecrated in 1877. The Caen stone reredos of this church erected in 1877 has alabaster carvings, representing the Magi, crucifixion and Old Testament figures. Appleyard was present at the consecration on 24 August 1877, listed alongside the architects Henry Walker and Joseph Athron who designed the building and reredos. Since no other stone carver is credited for this work, it is reasonable to suppose that it could be the work of Appleyard.

The pulpit is of alabaster and marble, designed by architect Thomas Armfield after the pulpit at the shrine of Sebaldus in St. Sebaldus Church, Nuremberg. (Note: For images of St Bartholomew's, Armley, see Category:St Bartholomew's Church, Armley.) It was carved originally by Mawer and Ingle for the former St Bartholomew's Church, on the occasion of its 1861 restoration, then moved together with the font to the new building after the consecration.

=== Baptist Chapel, Normanton, 1877–1878 ===
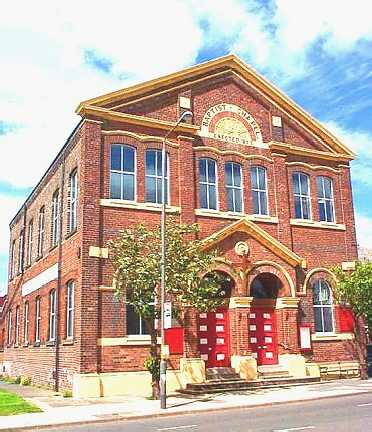
Normanton Baptist Church, in 2001

The foundation stone of this chapel was laid in August 1877. It was opened on the High Street of Normanton, West Yorkshire on 7 May 1878. It was designed at a cost of £3,000 (equivalent to £308,742 in 2025) by J.P. Kay of Leeds "after the classic order of architecture", and presented a "bold and substantial appearance". Appleyard was credited as carver. The Wakefield Free Press reported that, "the workmanship and finish throughout reflect great credit on the skill and taste of the gentlemen who took part in erecting this handsome edifice". The chapel has "a carved medallion, bearing the inscription and date". The building suffered a "devastating fire" in 2009, and was restored by William Birch. (Note: For images of Normanton Baptist Church, see: Category:Normanton Baptist Church.)

=== Decorative ceilings, Grand Theatre, Leeds, 1877–1878 ===
The Grand Theatre in Upper Briggate, Leeds, is a Grade II* listed building, designed by George Corson and his chief assistant James Robinson Watson, and opened in November 1878, having taken "thirteen months to build." It originally consisted of a theatre and assembly rooms, with shops in between. The interiors have been much changed, especially in the 1930s. Appleyard carried out ceiling work inside this combination building, contracted by J. Pollard of Bond Street. The auditorium has a "ribbed and domed ceiling with central chandelier and plaster pendentives," and the former assembly room (now the Opera North rehearsal room) has a "segmental-arched ceiling with ribs and panels decorated with reliefs of fruit and flowers." Describing the auditorium in 1878, The Yorkshire Post and Leeds Intelligencer said: "The roof, lighted by one great chandelier, presents a very rich appearance." "The prevailing colour of the decorations (was) crimson and gold." (Note: For images of the Grand Theatre ceilings, see: Category:Grand Theatre Leeds, ceilings.)

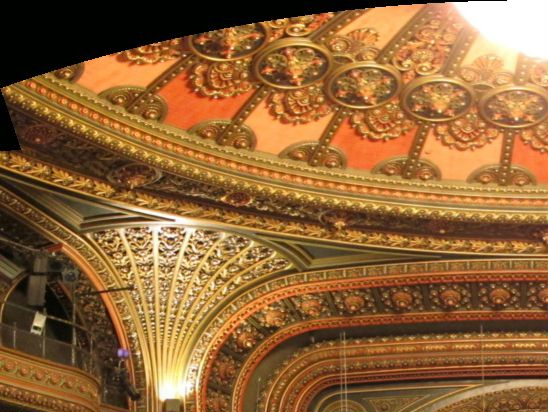
Part of auditorium ceiling of Grand Theatre, 1878

=== Ivanhoe Clock, Thornton's Arcade, Leeds, 1877–1878 ===
Thornton's Arcade is a Grade II listed building, designed by George Smith, and located between Lands Lane and Briggate in Leeds, West Yorkshire. It was in the planning stage in 1875, approved in 1877 and completed in 1878. The Ivanhoe Clock is a large, automated, public timepiece manufactured by Potts of Leeds between 1877 and 1878 to strike on the hour and each quarter. The figures were inspired by Walter Scott's Ivanhoe of 1819. Appleyard created the four life-sized, wooden, faux-Jacquemart figures of Richard I, Friar Tuck, Robin Hood and the swineherd Gurth. (Note: Gurth is a character in Scott's Ivanhoe. The Ivanhoe clock was painted in the 1940s. See this photo of the painters inside the clock, demonstrating the relative size of Appleyard's figures: Yorkshire Evening Post, 27 February 2017: Five things, Thornton's Arcade, Leeds) The figures appear to strike the bells, which are actually hit by hammers hidden behind the display. The Arcade's founder Charles Thornton already owned the music hall which later became the City Varieties, so these pantomime figures are in keeping with his showmanship. The clock was once manually wound, but was automated in 1955, and was restored in 1997.

The wooden female head, inside and above the door opposite the clock, is a likeness of Gainsborough's Portrait of Georgiana, Duchess of Devonshire. It is likely to be the work of Appleyard because it is in the same theatrical style as the clock figures, it is worked in the same materials, and is also painted. It was placed here as a topical subject because Gainsborough's portrait painting was stolen in 1877 while the arcade was under construction. (Note: For images of the Ivanhoe Clock and Thornton's Arcade sculptures, see: Category:Thornton's Arcade clock, and Category:Thorntons Arcade wooden head sculptures.)

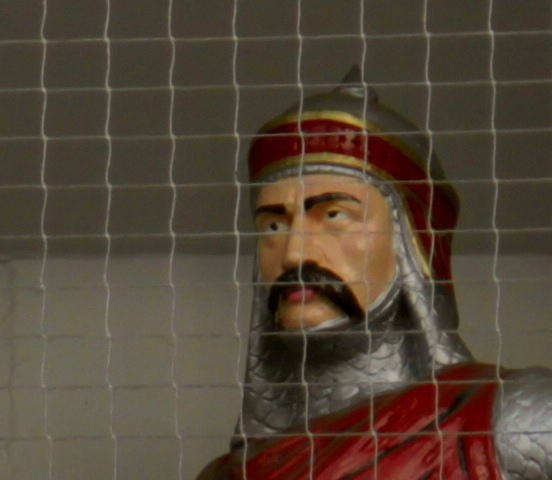
Richard the Lionheart, 1878

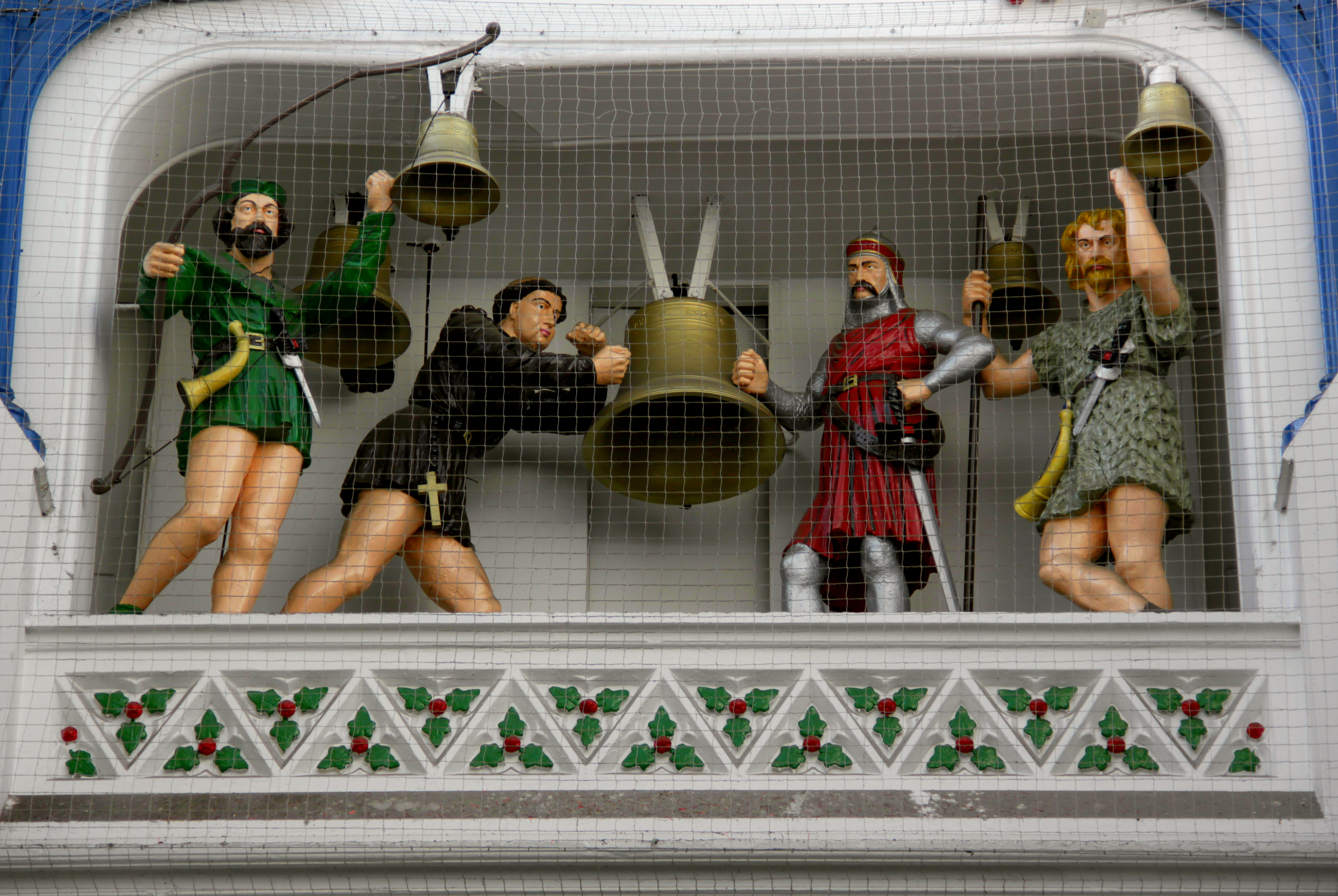
The four Jacquemart figures, 1878

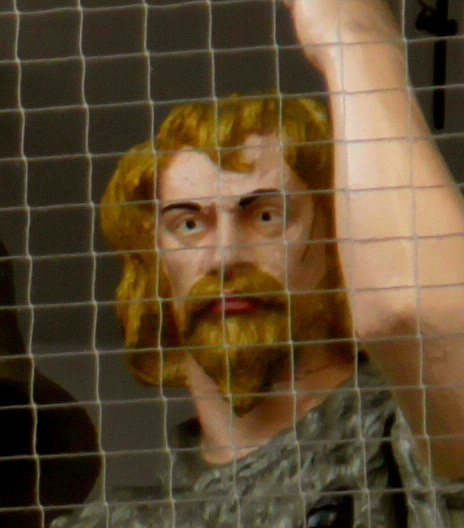
The swineherd, Gurth, 1878

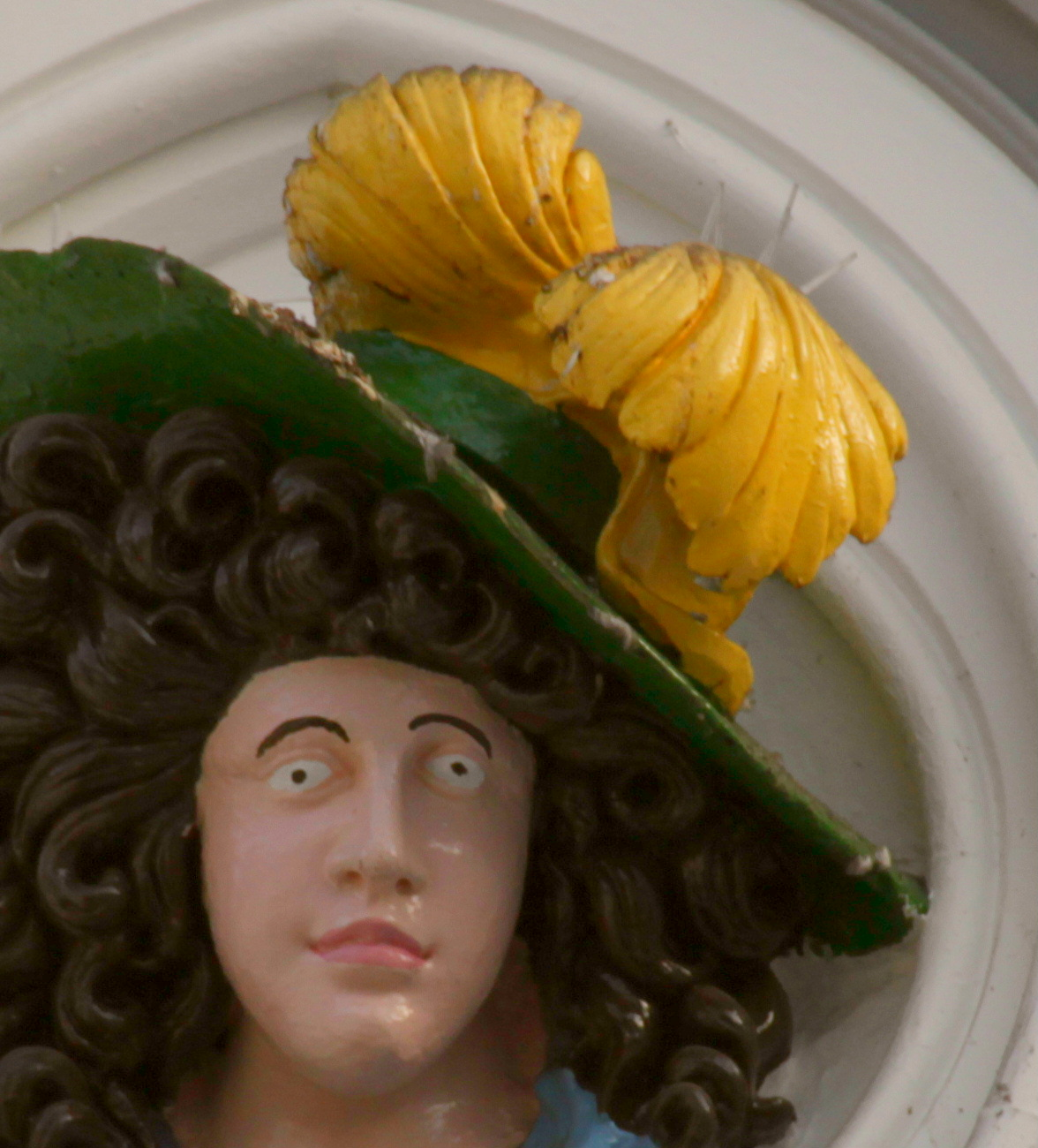
Georgiana, Duchess of Devonshire, 1878

=== Barran's Fountain, Roundhay Park, Leeds, 1882 ===
This is a Grade II listed building, designed by Thomas Ambler (1838–1920) in Park Springs stone. It is a rotunda-shaped drinking fountain in Roundhay Park, Leeds, West Yorkshire, England. Appleyard executed the carving on this domed fountain, which was donated by the founder of Roundhay Park, Sir John Barran. The fountain was opened for public use on Monday 3 April 1882. Around the inside of the dome is the inscription: "Presented to the Leeds Corporation by John Barran, M.P., April 3rd 1882."

As a drinking fountain, the structure is no longer functional. It originally had "ornate bronze vases through which the water issues, to the taps, the drinking cups, and their connections, all being very pretty. The minute detail with which everything is executed reflects creditably on all concerned." The four-foot hole in the dome was " covered with plate glass 3/4 of an inch thick, painted with a rosette in the centre and surrounded by guilloché ornament." It still has the "red granite basins – moulded, cut and polished," and "each basin (was originally) supplied by a bronze vase. Those on the outside (had) three taps and those on the inside (had) two taps, of bronze, with sea-horse heads, and electro-silver plated ... Surrounding the basins (were) iron gratings, to receive any overflow." The original bronze fittings were designed by Ambler and made by Warner & Sons of London, and the stained glass roof insert (now gone) was made by the St Helen's Company. (Note: For images of Barran's Fountain, see: Category:Barran's Fountain.)

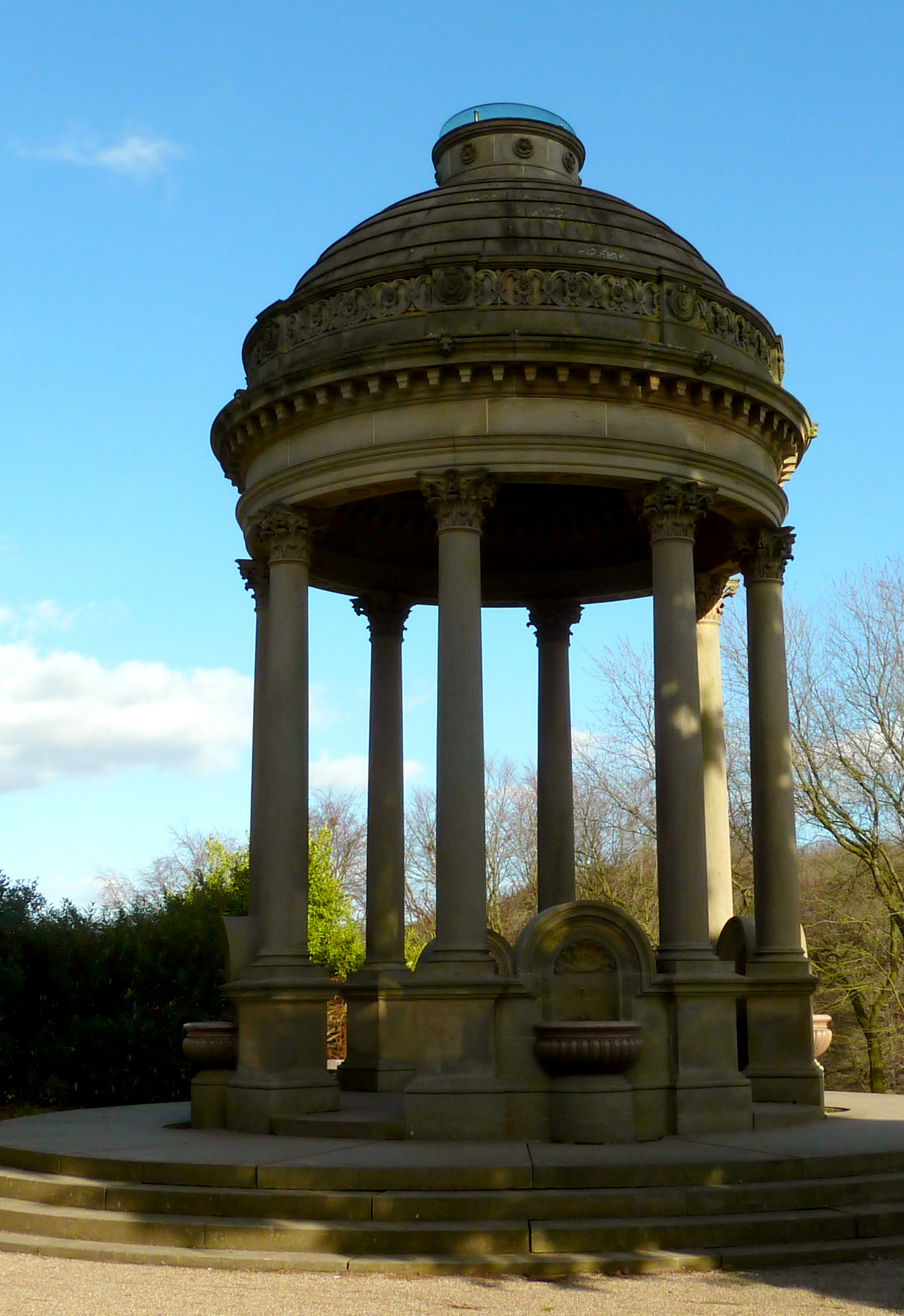
Barran's Fountain, 1882

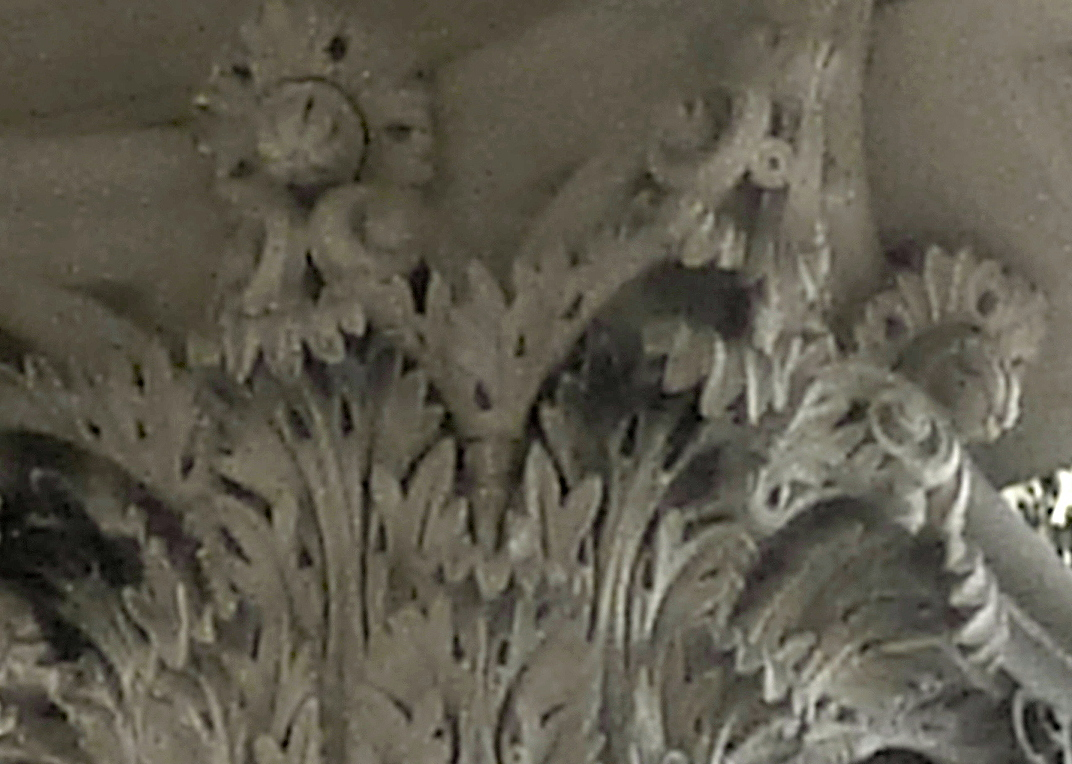
Corinthian capital, 1882

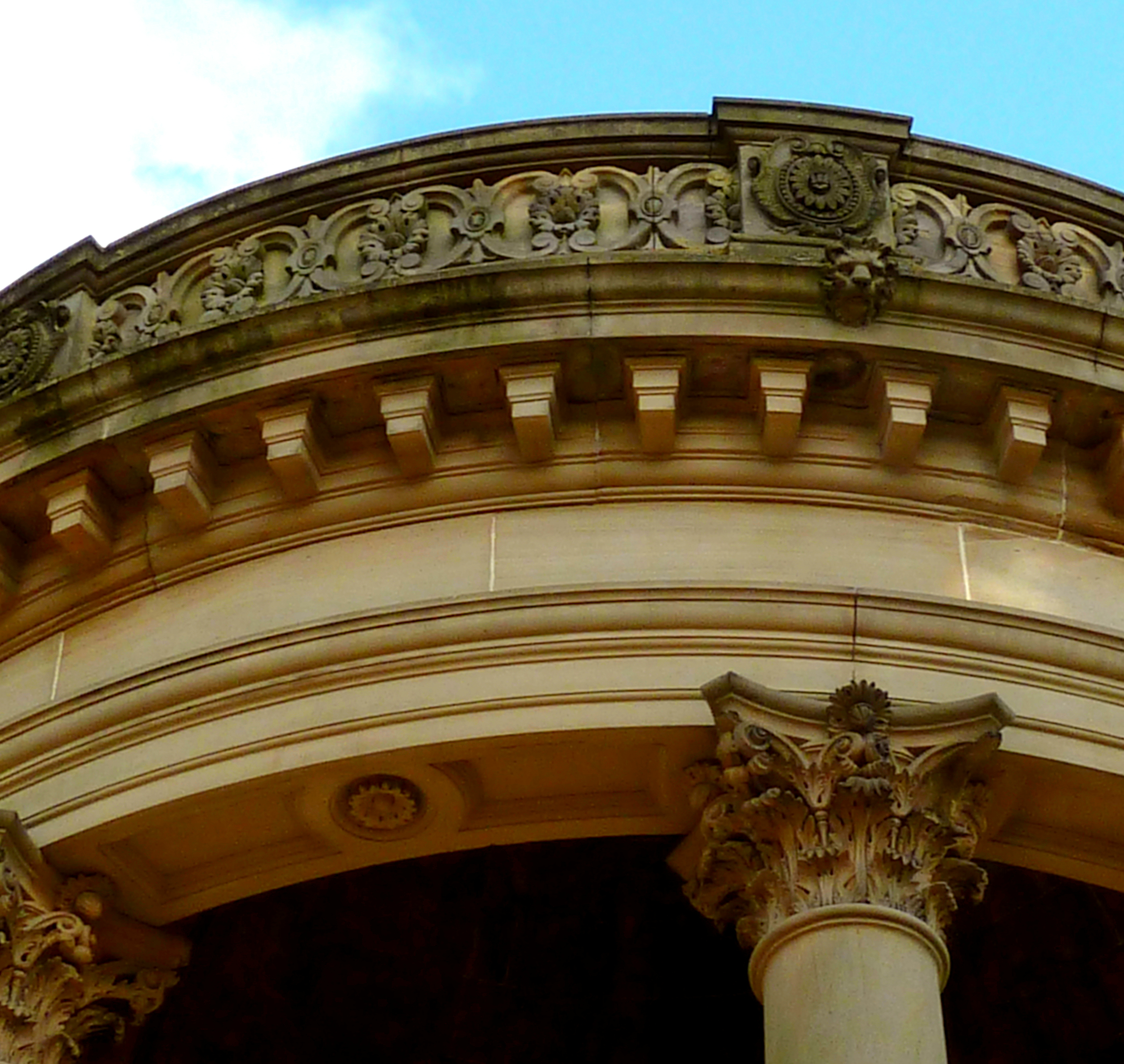
Barran's Fountain, 1882

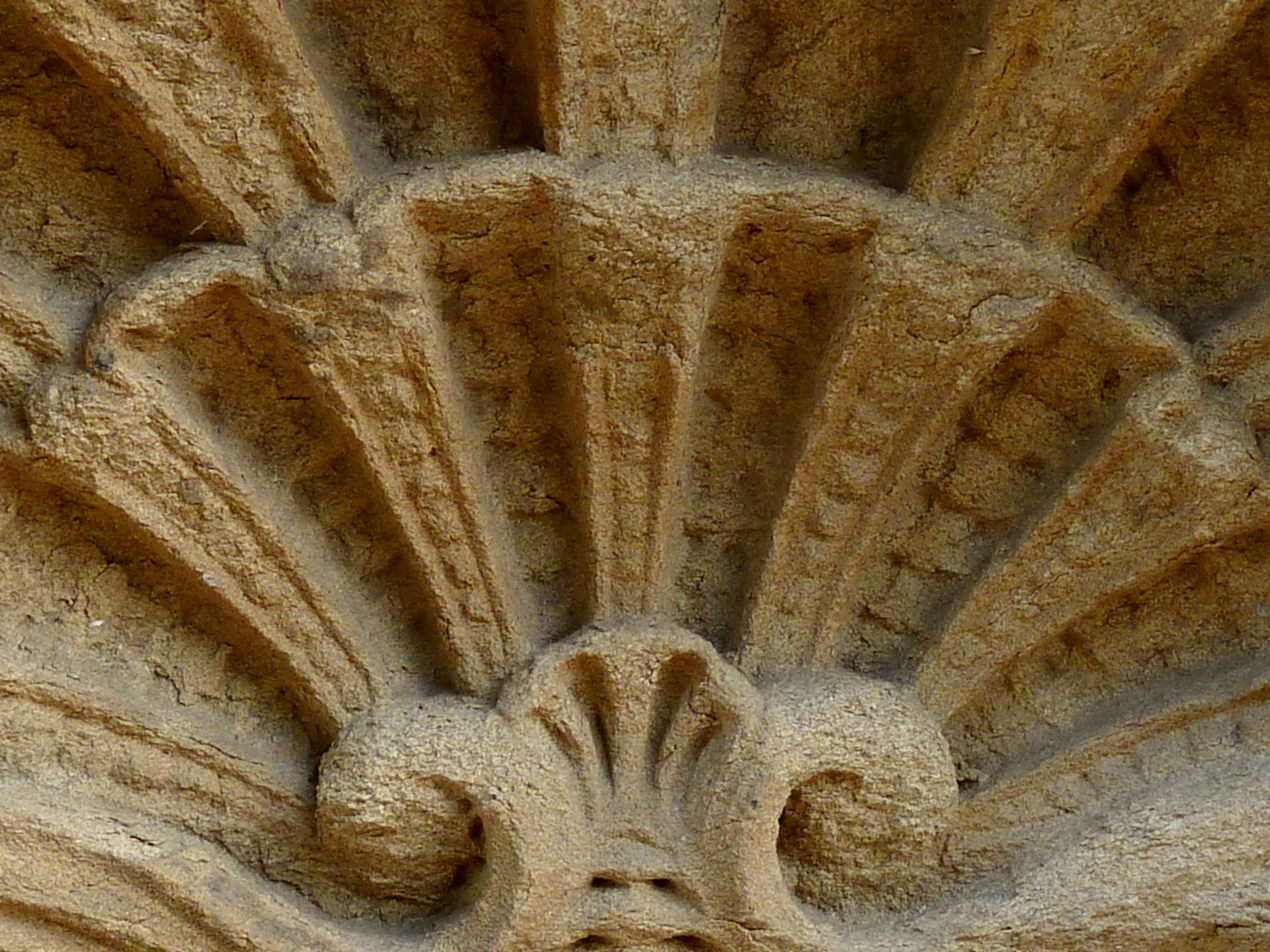
Shell splashback, 1882

=== Central Library interior, Leeds, 1878–1884 ===
Leeds Central Library is a listed building, designed as municipal buildings by George Corson to complement the Town Hall. The foundation stone was laid in 1878, and the building was completed in April 1884. Appleyard led the team of stone carvers who worked on the interior staircases, pillars and arches (except for the alabaster entrance-hall arch, carved by Farmer & Brindley). His name and Corson's are engraved in a ratepayers' ledger which features on a carved roundel "high on the wall" of the entrance hall, between the staircases: on the left-hand page "1883 Appleyard fecit", and on the right, "G. Corson architect". The other stone carvers of the interior staircases and arches have not been identified, and the extent of Appleyard's contribution to the artwork is unknown. (Note: Appleyard's team of carvers were not named in newspapers, which suggests that they were local, i.e. not imported big-name sculptors. For images of the Leeds Central Library stair rail carvings, and in interior carvings, see: Category:Leeds Central Library, stair rail carvings, and Category:Leeds Central Library, interior carvings.)

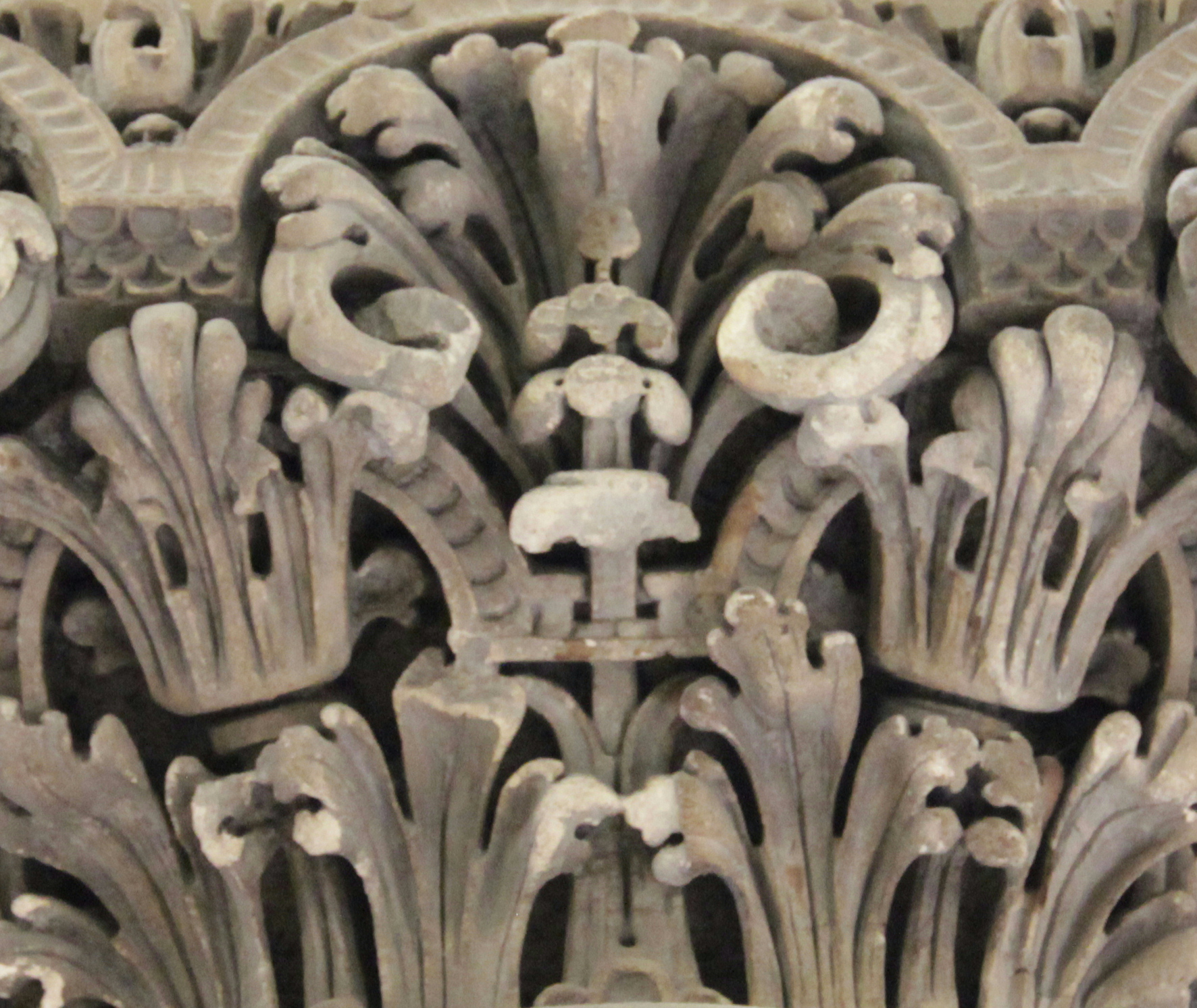
Carved capital on staircase, 1884

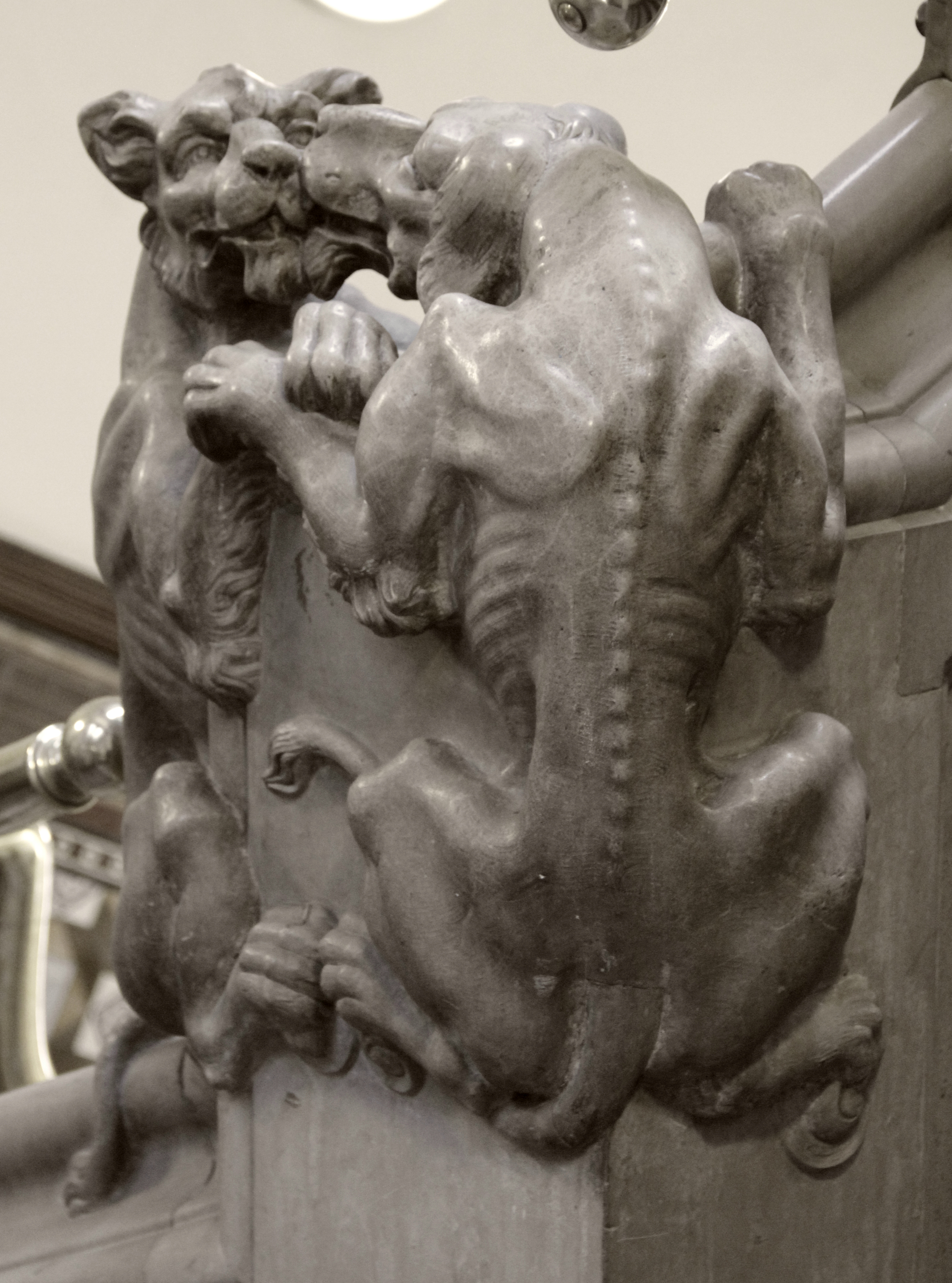
Lion dogs, 1884

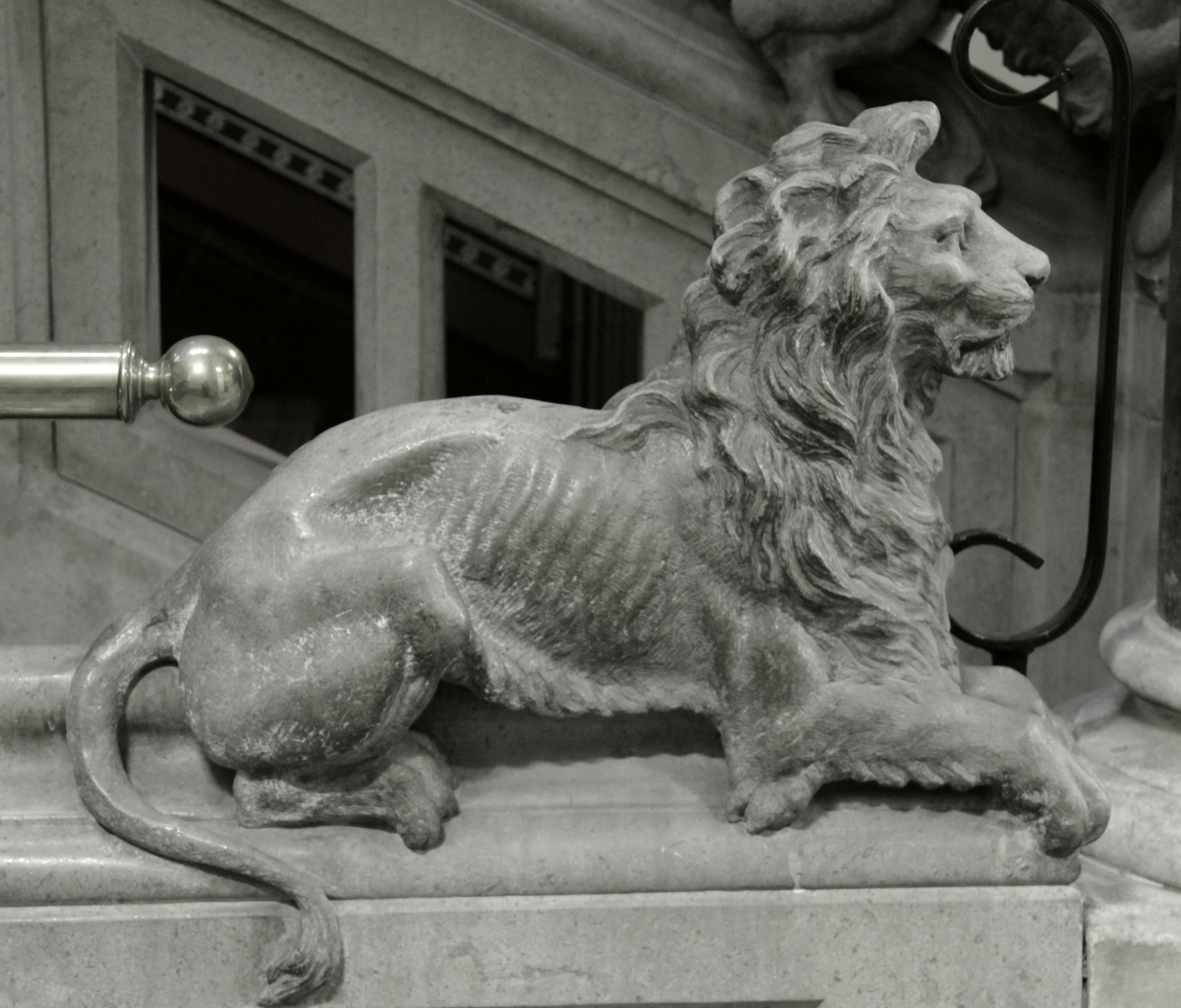
Lion couchant, 1884

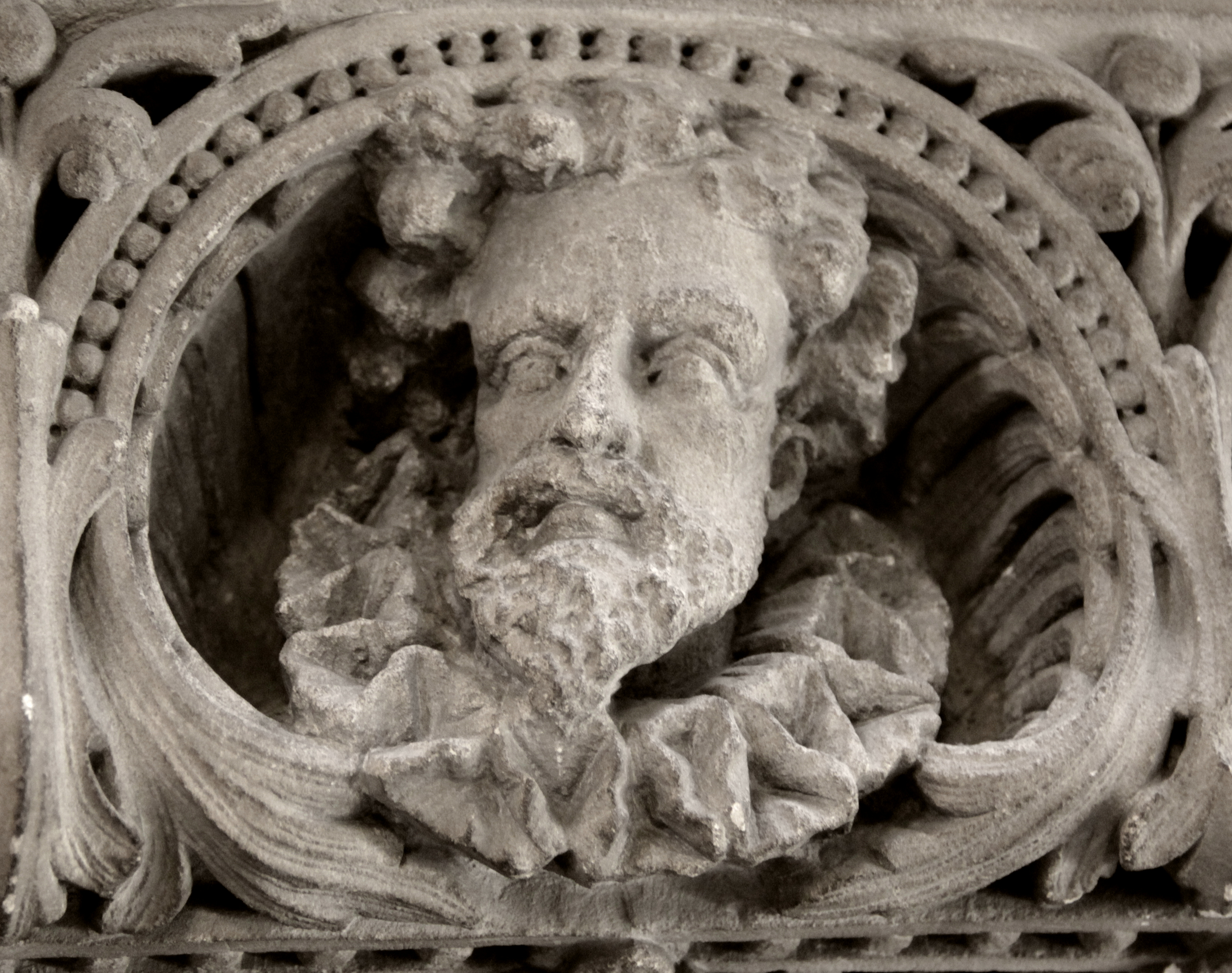
Portrait of George Corson on a capital, 1884

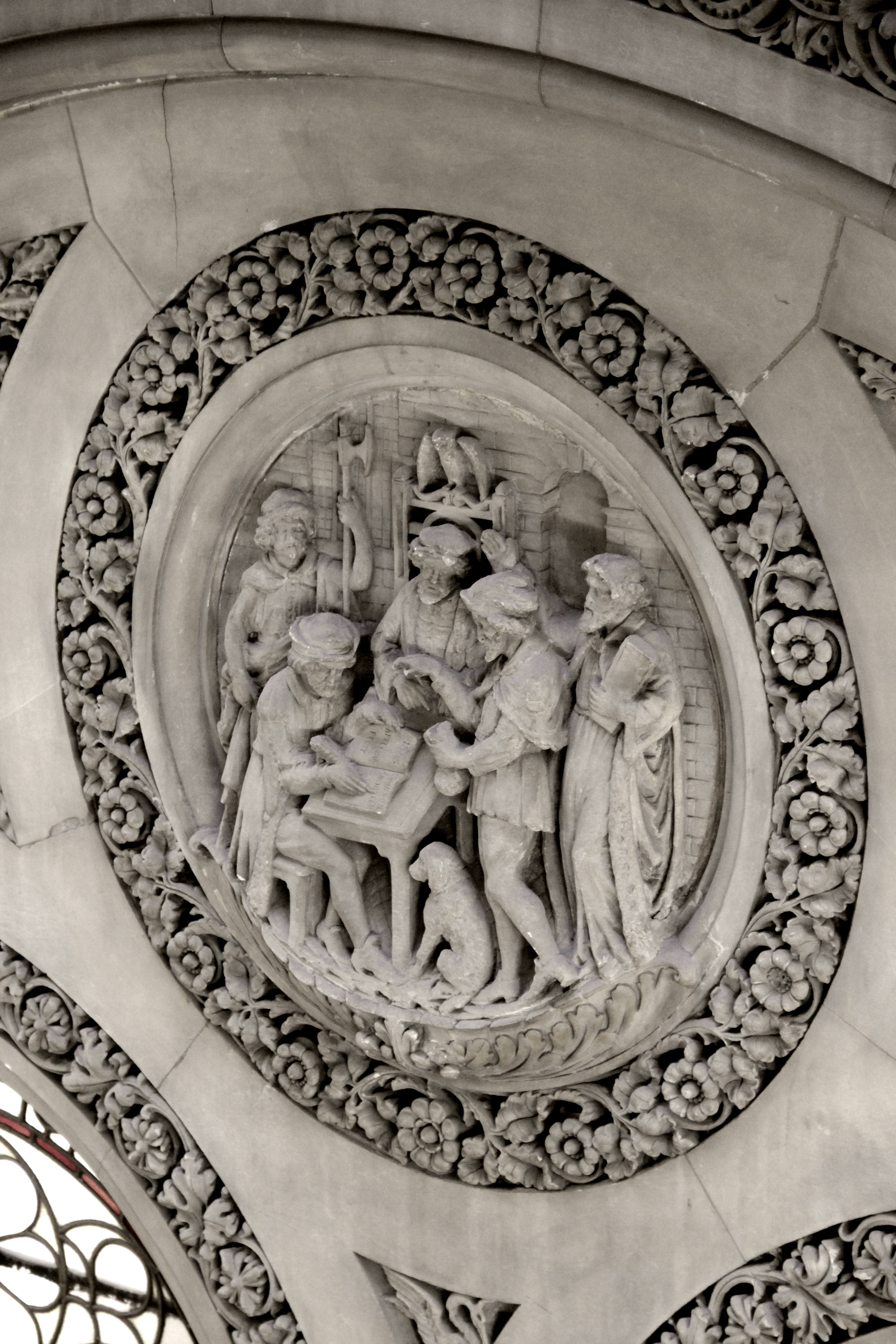
The credit-roundel by Appleyard, 1883

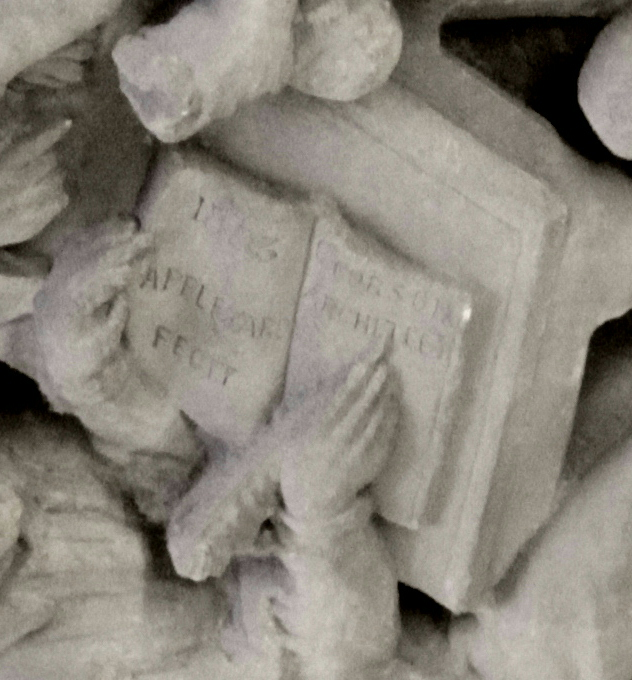
Close-up of the ledger (rotated), 1883

=== Leeds Fine Art Gallery, Leeds, 1886–1888 ===
This is a listed building. It was designed at a cost of £9,000 by William Henry Thorp (1852–1944) of Albion Street, Leeds, and opened by Archibald Witham Scarr (1827–1904), Mayor of Leeds, and Hubert von Herkomer on Wednesday 3 October 1888. Its ground floor gallery was called the Queen's Room (renamed as of 2019 the Ziff Gallery):

A beautiful rectangular apartment with arches crossing its corners, which give the roof an octagonal character, with coved ceiling and lantern, and with clerestory lights through arcades, with classic moulded pilasters; it has a fine frieze designed by Mr Thorp, and carried out by Mr J.W. Appleyard, with panels bearing the names of Hogarth, Reynolds, Gainsborough, and Turner. past Grand Masters of the English School of Painting.

The frieze and ceiling was painted ivory white, and the walls were maroon "of dead texture" to show off the artworks and frames. Although the room is still there, the frieze is lost, or possibly hidden. (Note: The frieze is likely to have consisted of a series of carved, bas relief wooden panels, painted. During a 20th or 21st century renovation, the original tongue-and-groove walls of the Ziff (formerly Queen's) Gallery were covered by a cladding of additional inner walls strong enough to support heavy picture frames without the use of picture rails. This meant that the frieze was covered too. So the frieze may still exist behind the current inner walls. However that part of frieze which spanned the corner arches is unlikely to remain. (Information from Gallery records). .For historical images of Leeds City Art Gallery, see: Category:History of Leeds City Art Gallery.)

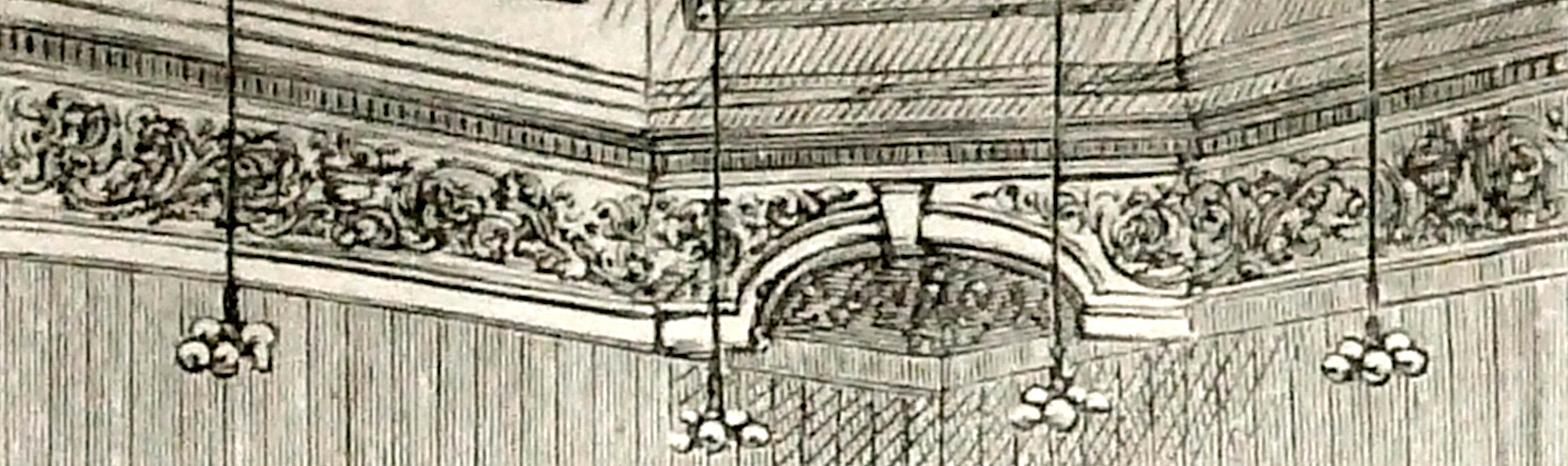
Frieze, 1888, in Queen's Room (now missing)

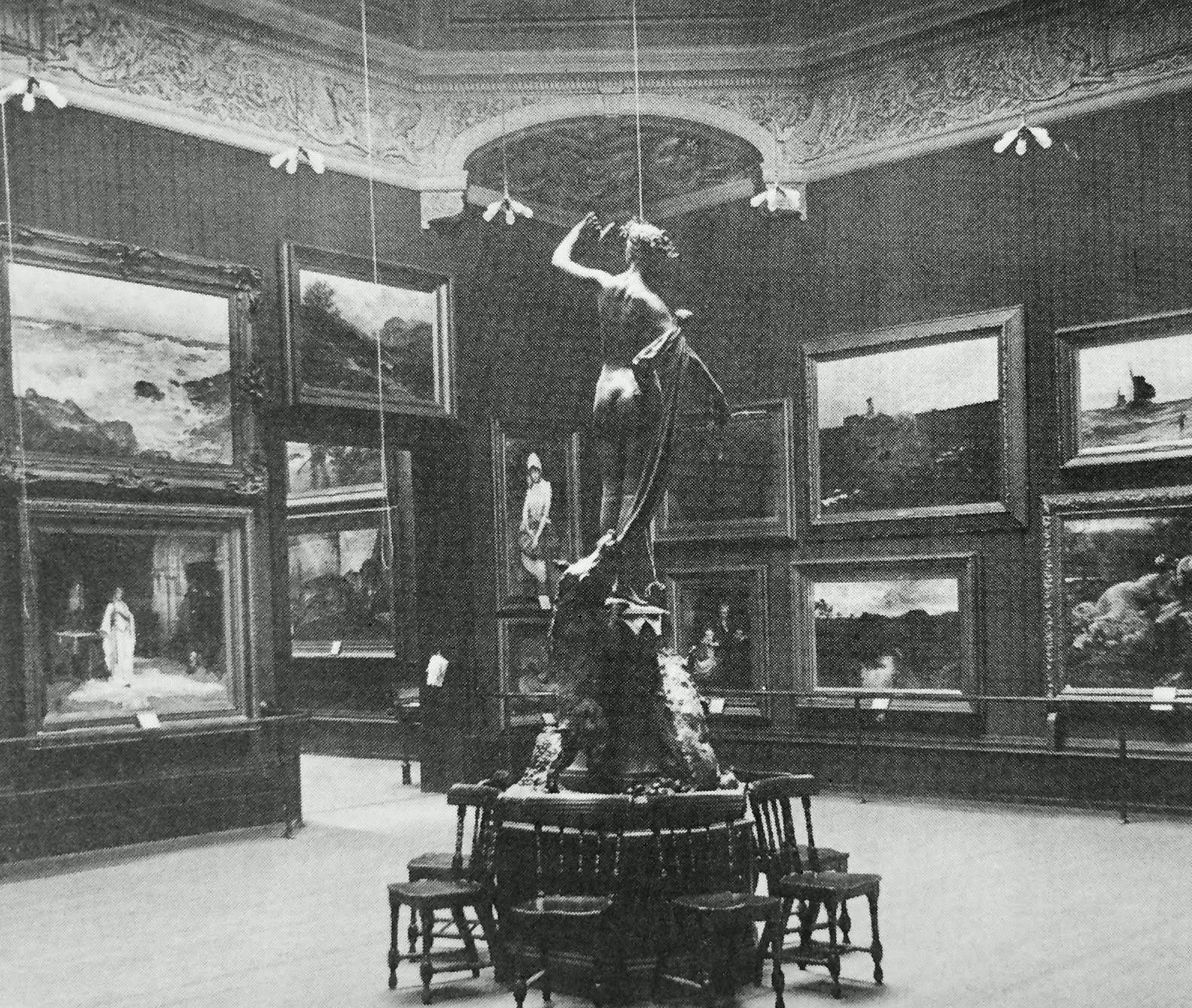
The frieze in 1911

=== Newton Park Union Church, Chapeltown/Potternewton, 1887–1889 ===
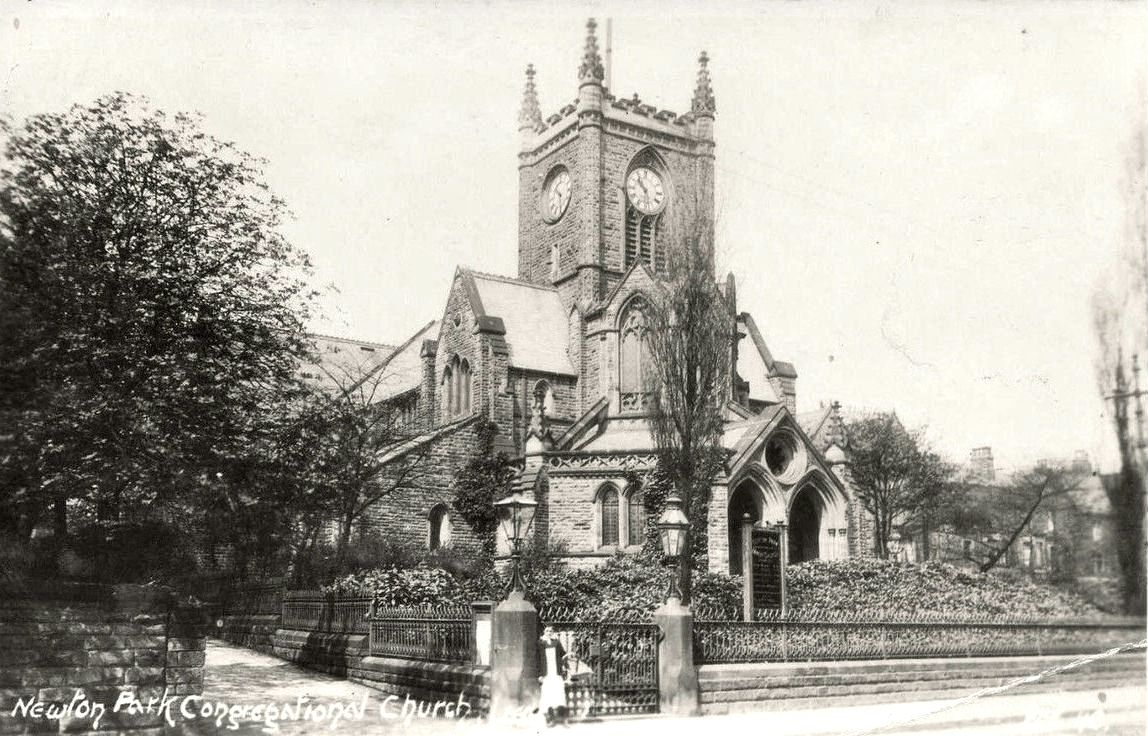
Newton Park Union Church

Newton Park Union Church is a Grade II listed building. It was designed at a cost of £6,200 "in the fourteenth century decorated Gothic style" for the newly joined Congregationalists and Baptists by Archibald Neill (1856–1933), of East Parade, Leeds, and opened on Wednesday 3 April 1889. The new church was built on the eastern side on the original Lupton family's Congregational Chapel, built in 1870. The new church had a 70-foot tower with a clock by Pearce & Sons; on each angle was a turret with an octagonal crocketed pinnacle. It had an octagonal nave with arcading and clerestory. "The pulpit and communion rails, of oak, are beautifully carved." J. W. Appleyard was credited as one of the contractors, but it is not known whether he carved wood or stone here. At some point the clock was replaced by one by Potts of Leeds, which had originally been installed in Wellington Station, Leeds, in 1916. The building was deconsecrated in 1952 and became the Royal Air Force Association Club, The Old Central Hebrew Congregational Synagogue, then finally a Sikh temple. The original 1870 Chapel was damaged by fire in 2005 and as of 2019 was derelict. (Note: For images of Newton Park Union Church, see: Category:Newton Park Union Church Chapeltown.)

=== Memorial to J.F. Longrigg, St Paul's, Shipley, 1890 ===
This wall memorial to the Rev. John Fallowfield Longrigg MA, who died 8 September 1888, was produced in Appleyard's stoneyard. It is in St Paul's Church, Kirkgate, Shipley, West Yorkshire, a Grade II listed building, and consists of a white marble tablet on a slab of empress red marble which was originally "on the west wall, to the right of the central doorway, of St Paul's Church." It is now on the left side of the door. Longrigg had initiated a young men's class during his curacy, and this group organised the funding by subscription of the tablet, which was "completed in a very artistic manner". Longrigg also initiated the poor children's annual Christmas dinner at Shipley, and this work continued for many years after he left St Paul's. The dedication is to the "rarest devotion to duty" by Longrigg, who was curate of St Paul's 1885–1887, after which he was vicar of Emmanuel Church in Woodhouse Lane, Leeds from November 1887. He died suddenly in September of the following year. (Note: For images of the Longrigg memorial, see: Category:St Paul Shipley, Longrigg memorial.)

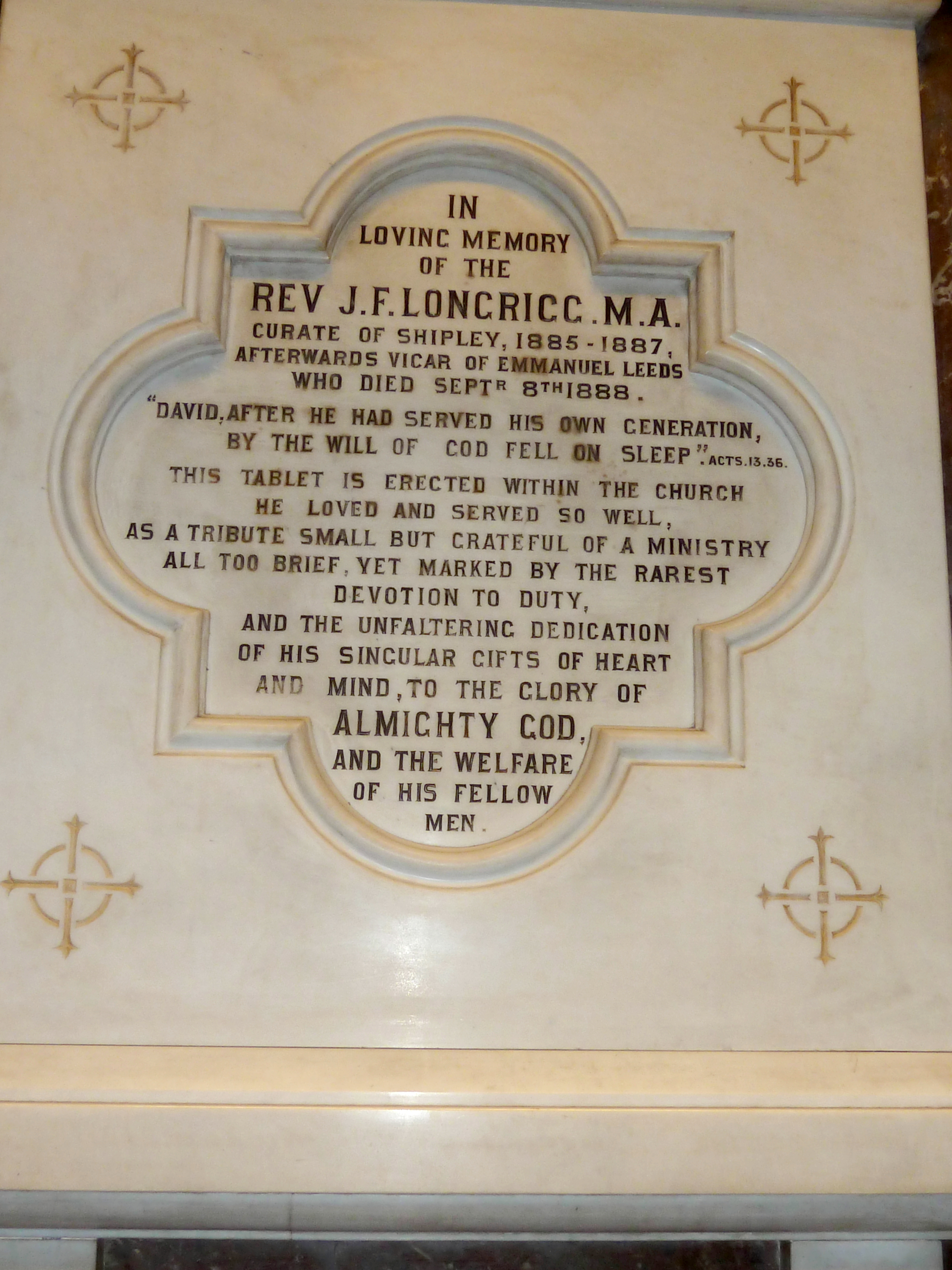
Longrigg memorial, 1890, closeup

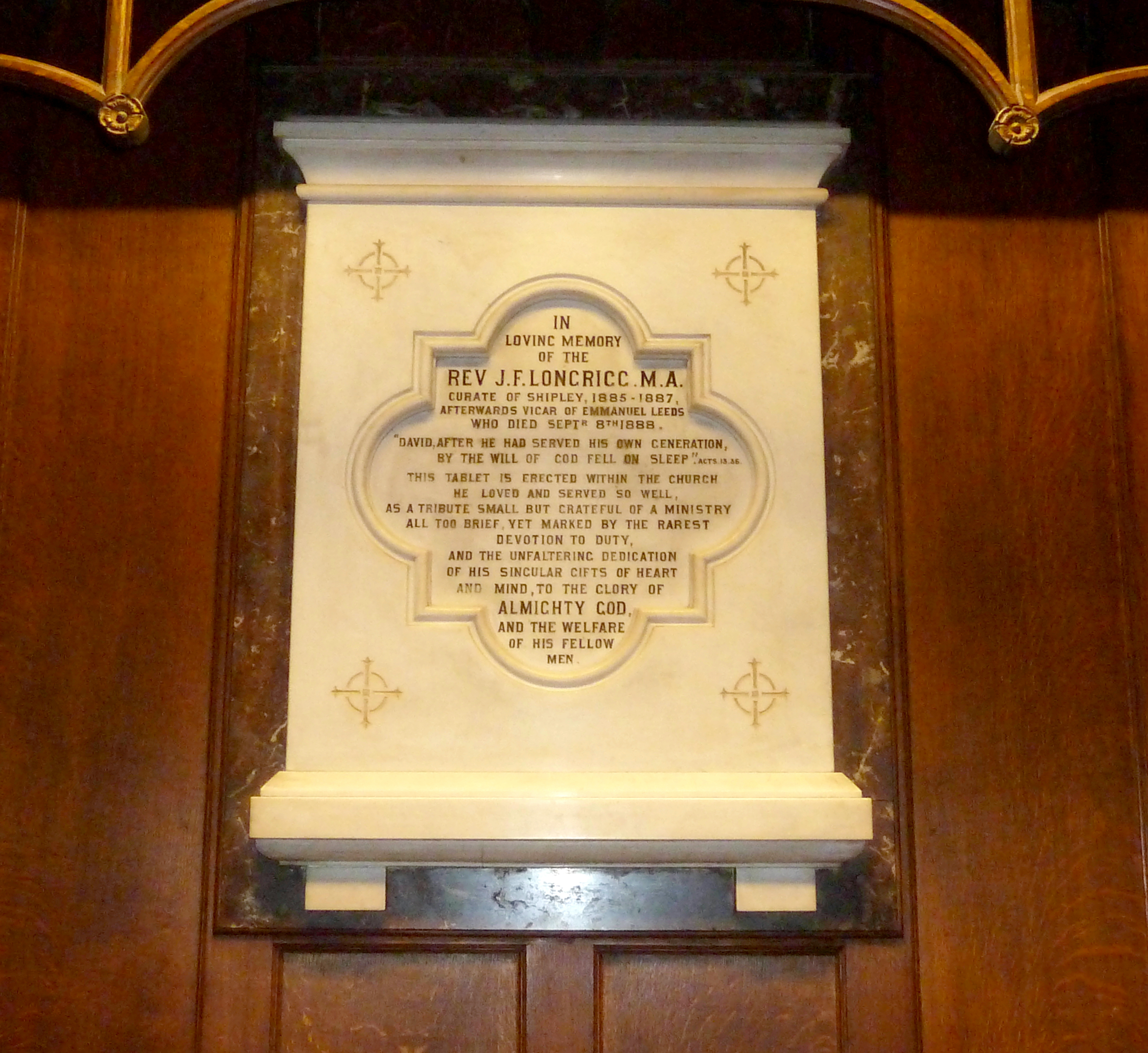
Longrigg memorial, 1890

=== London and Midland Bank, Leeds, 1890–1892 ===
This is a listed building. It is on the south-west side of Kirkgate (number 110) where it meets Vicar Lane. It faces the south-west corner of Kirkgate Market. It was designed by William Bakewell (1839–1925) of Leeds at a cost of £4,500 (equivalent to £494,334.24 in 2025), with carving by J.W. Appleyard. Work was begun in 1890. The walls of the banking hall were lined with light-veined Italian marble, the floor was of mosaic, the fittings included a five-foot dado and were of solid American walnut, and the ceiling was "richly panelled." The stone for the exterior came from the Morley and Idle quarries, and the building carries the arms of Leeds and London. Heating was "effected by hot air pipes disposed in coils throughout the building," and there was a hydraulic lift. It was open for business in December 1891, but did not move into the new premises until February 1892. The Pevsner Guide cites "fine carving, including King Midas." English Heritage says that above the pediment there is a "draped female statue flanked by animals, a lion and unicorn at corners," however the statue is of a bearded man with donkey's ears; he is isolated, representing tragedy - and he has no crown. It is Midas who has lost everything. (Note: For images of the London and Midland Bank, Leeds, see: Category:110 Kirkgate, Leeds.)

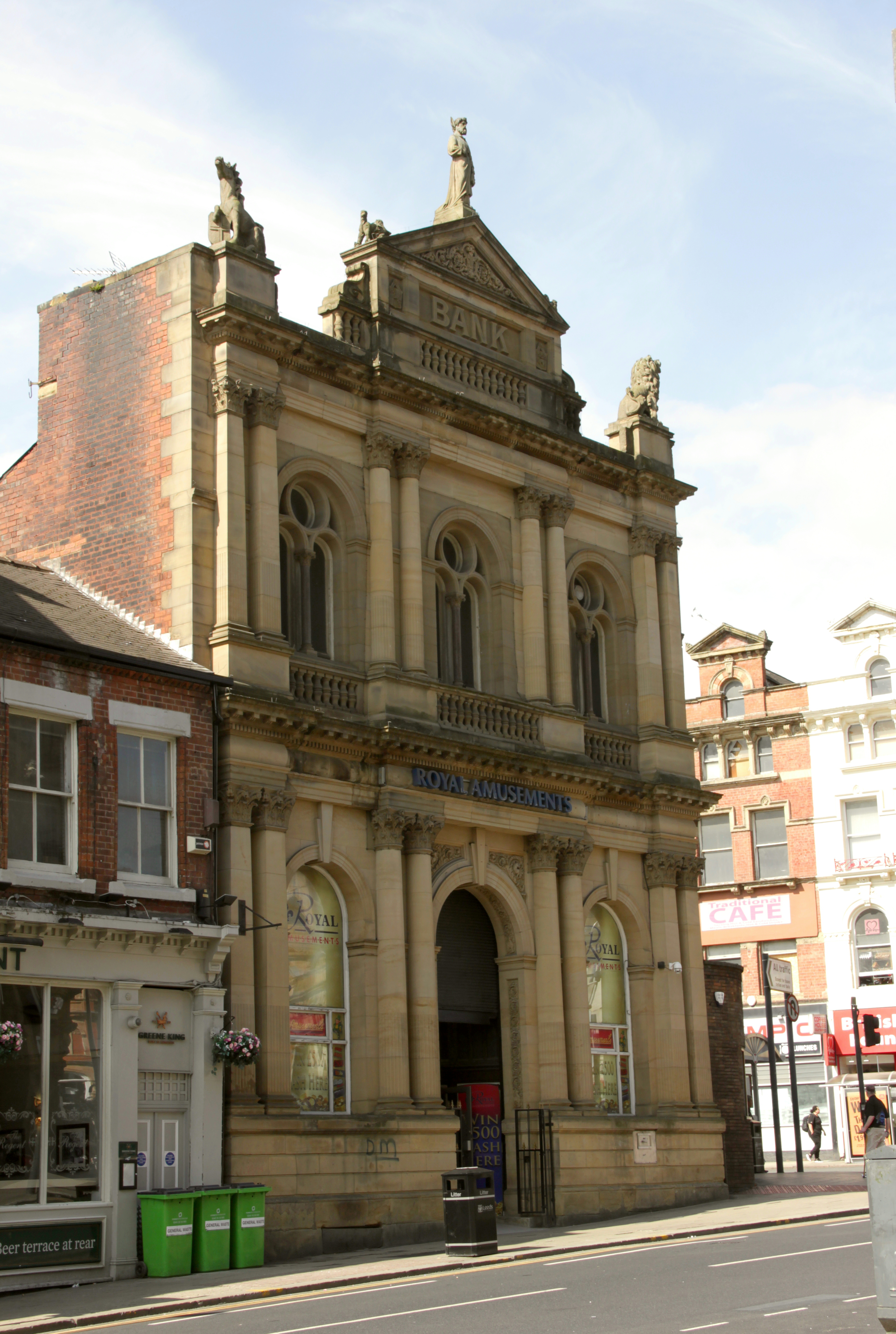
The building in 2019

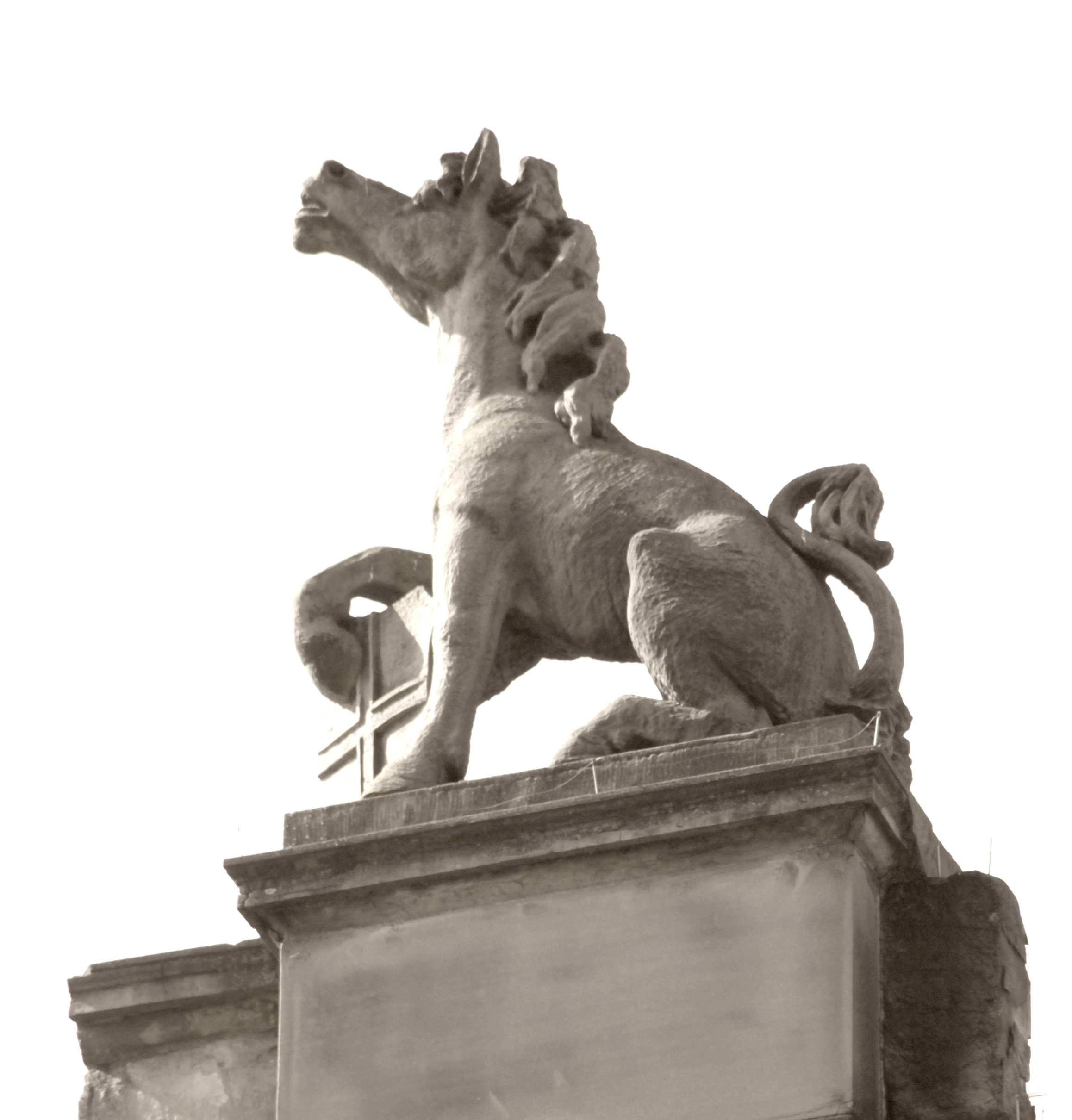
Unicorn on left of pediment

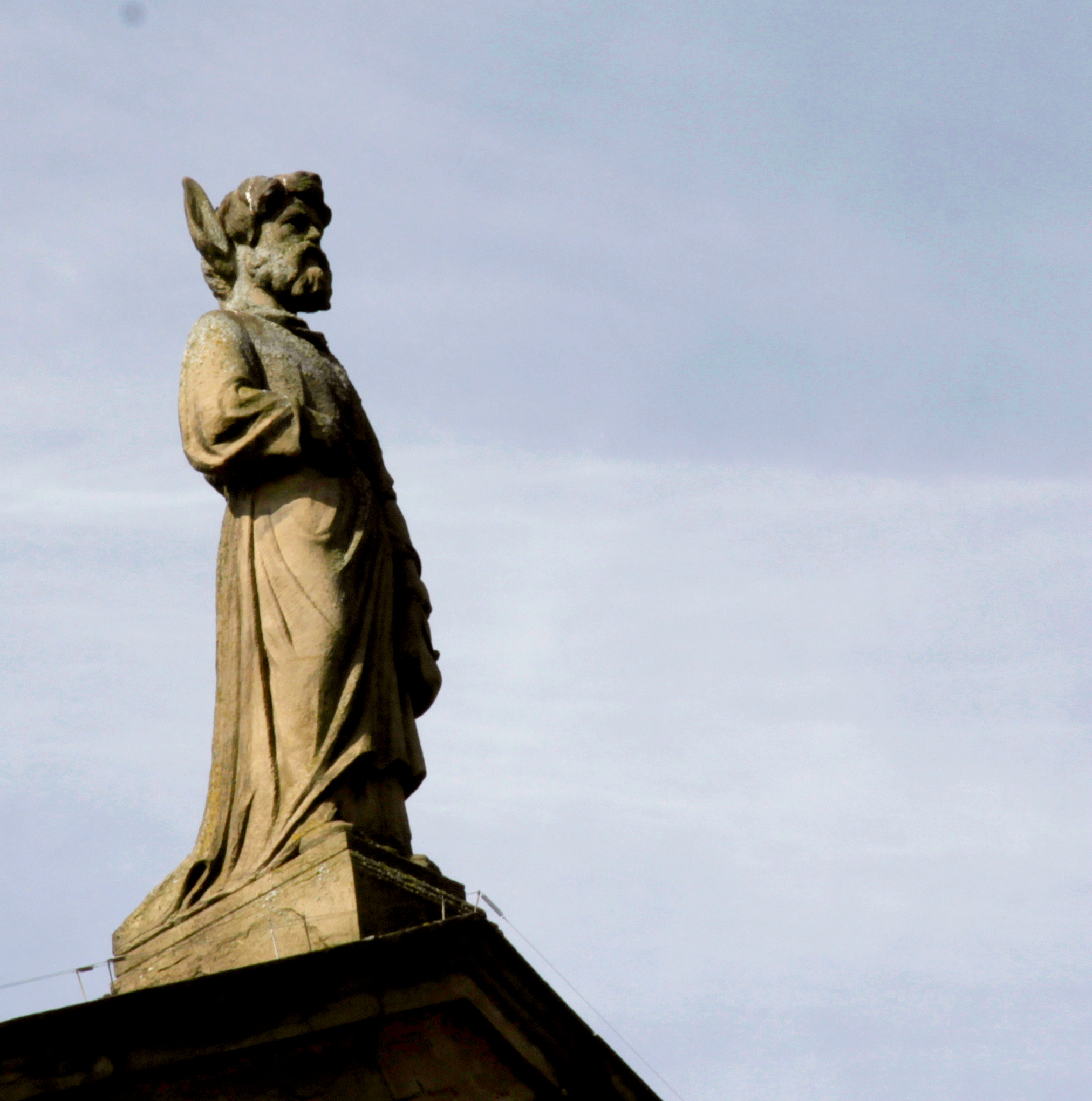
Midas on top of pediment, 1892

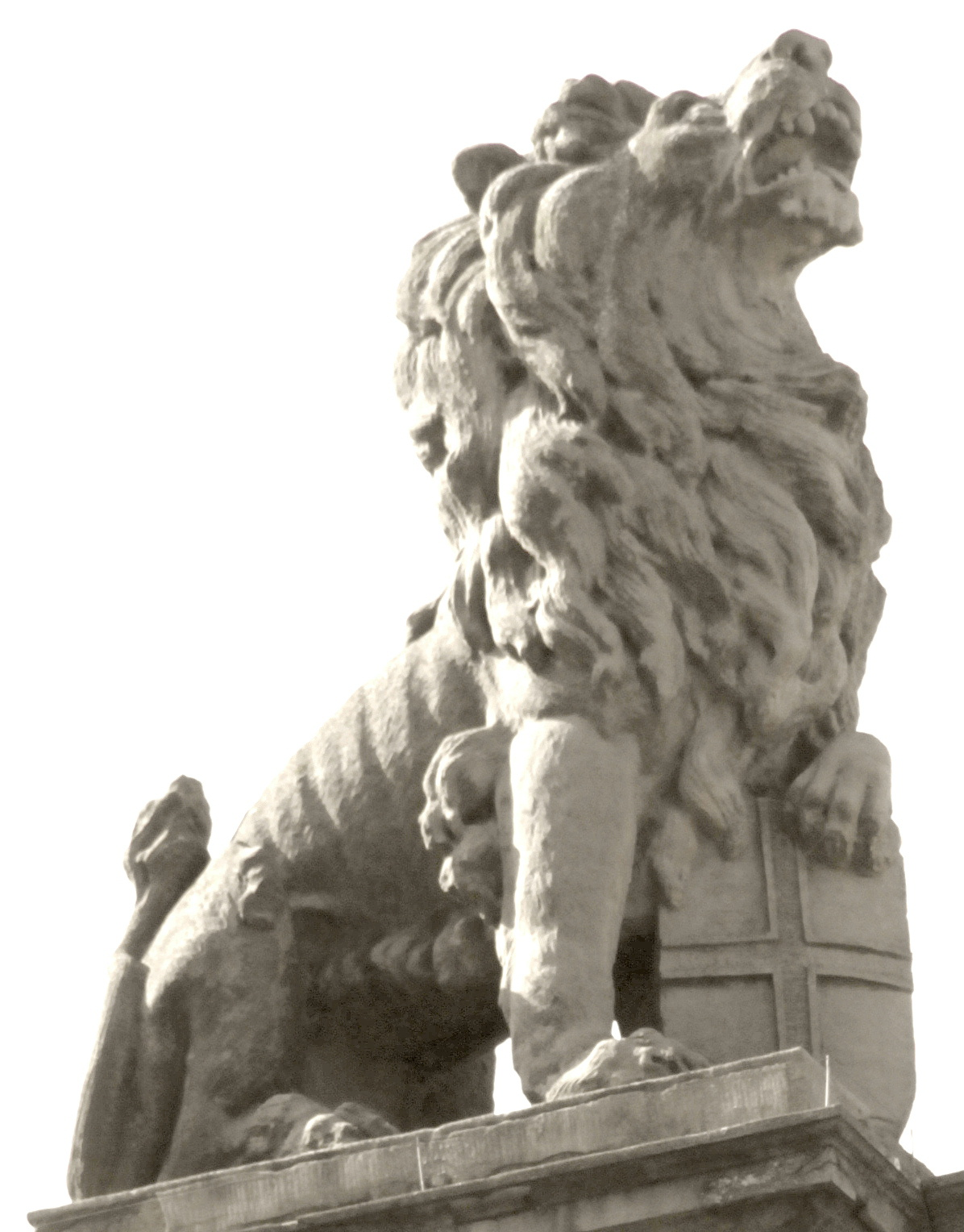
Lion on right of pediment

=== York City and County Bank, Leeds, 1890–1892 ===
This is a listed building. It was built originally as the York City and County Bank. For several years until 2019 it was Jamie's restaurant. It is on the corner of Park Row and Bond Court, Leeds, West Yorkshire. It was designed by Stephen Ernest Smith (1845–1925) and John Tweedale (1853–1905) of 12 South Parade, Leeds, and completed in 1892. It has a decorated frieze. The Pevsner guide cites carved exterior detail by John Wormald Appleyard at the corner entrance, on the upper floor, and on Corinthian columns. The exterior is of "cleansed Bradford stone ... the frieze and pediment being carried by polished red granite columns. The architecture of the first and second floors is of a Corinthian order, having coupled columns, and the whole is crowned by richly carved frieze, cornice, and vase terminals." (Note: Pevsner has copied this from the Leeds Illustrated of 1892; the building probably never had the vase terminals.) The walls of the banking hall were originally lined with Burmantofts faience. The hall's furnishings were of half-polished oak with specially designed brass fittings. The first and second floors were intended as offices, with their own strong room on each floor, and their own Bond Street entrance. There was also a "fine suite of offices" on the ground floor, with its own Park Row entrance. The opening of this building was delayed due to a major fire at the saw mill belonging to Nicholson & Son of Prospect Works, Crown Point Road, Leeds. "The preparation of the woodwork, some of it of a highly ornate and valuable character, such as carved screens and the like, was in an advanced stage; but none had left the premises." This work, intended for the York City and County Bank, was destroyed by the fire. (Note: For images of the York City and County Bank, see: Category:York City and County Bank, Park Row, Leeds.)

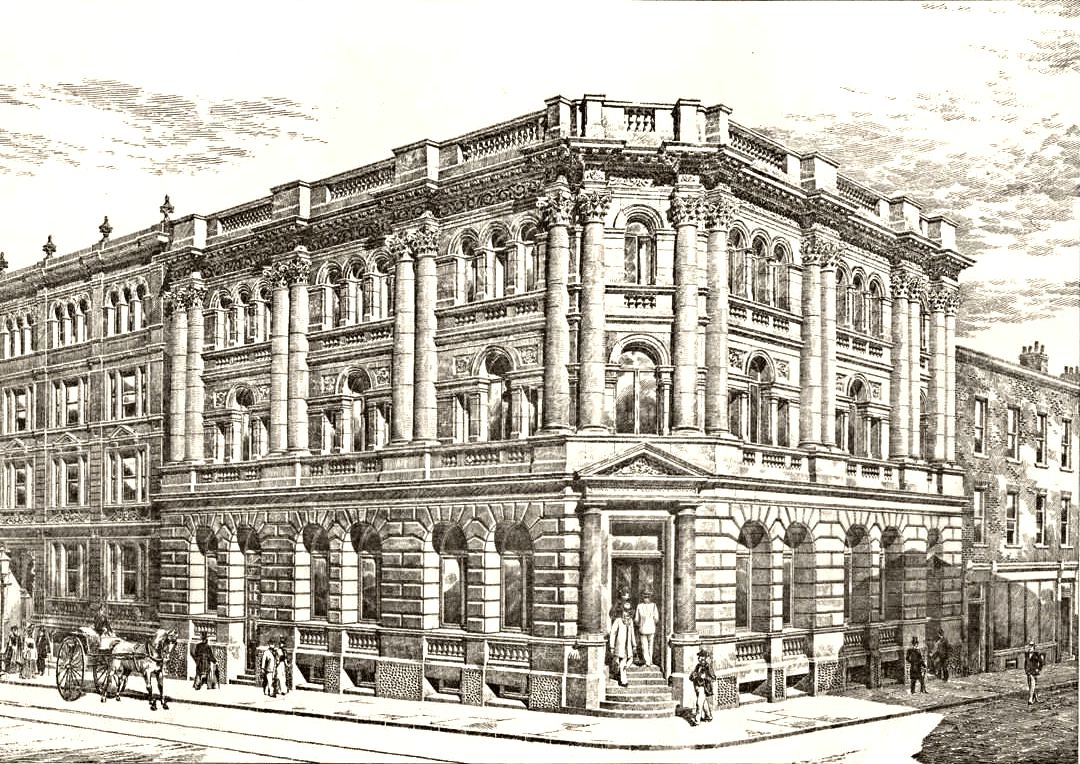
Architect's drawing, 1892

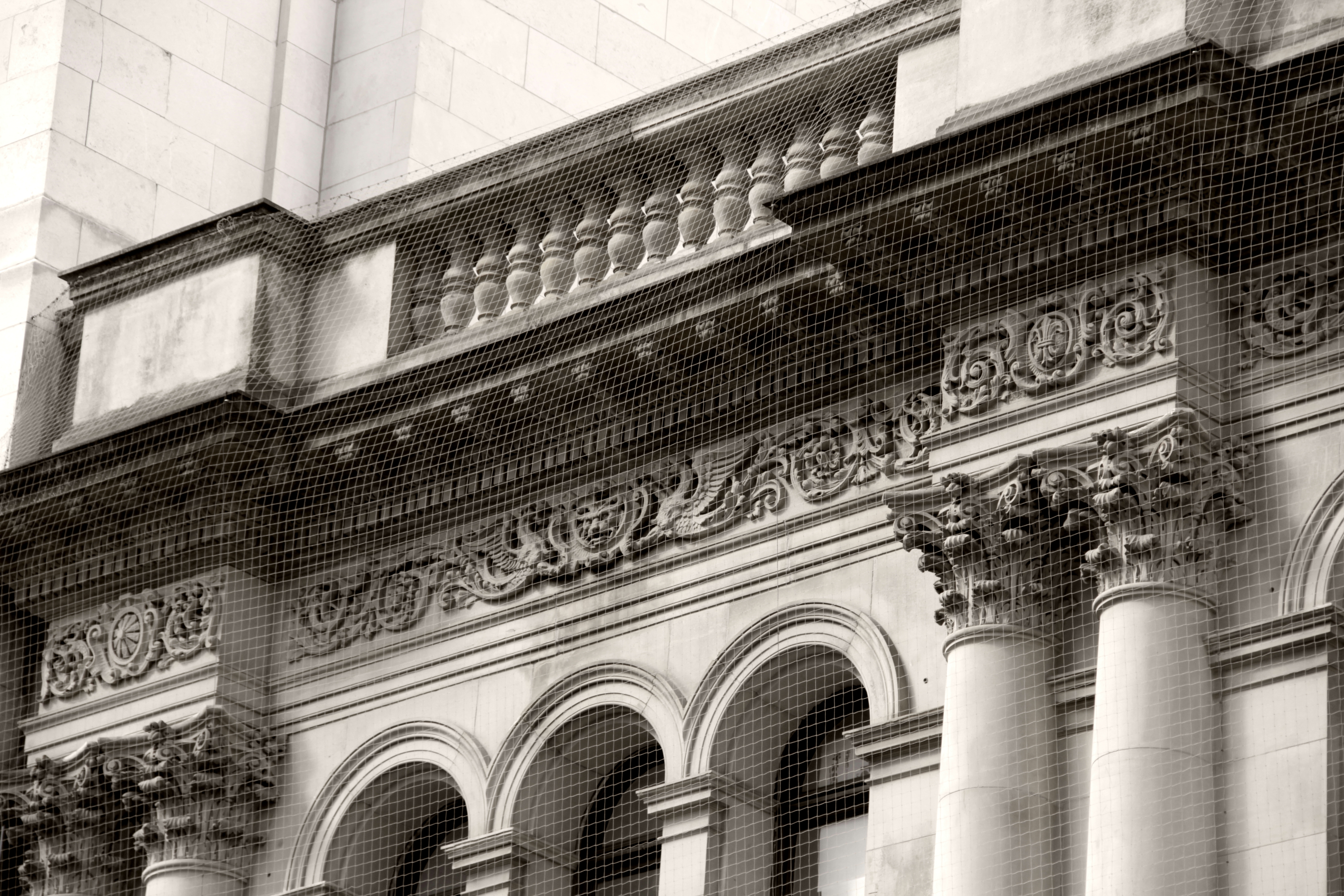
Frieze under cornice, 1892

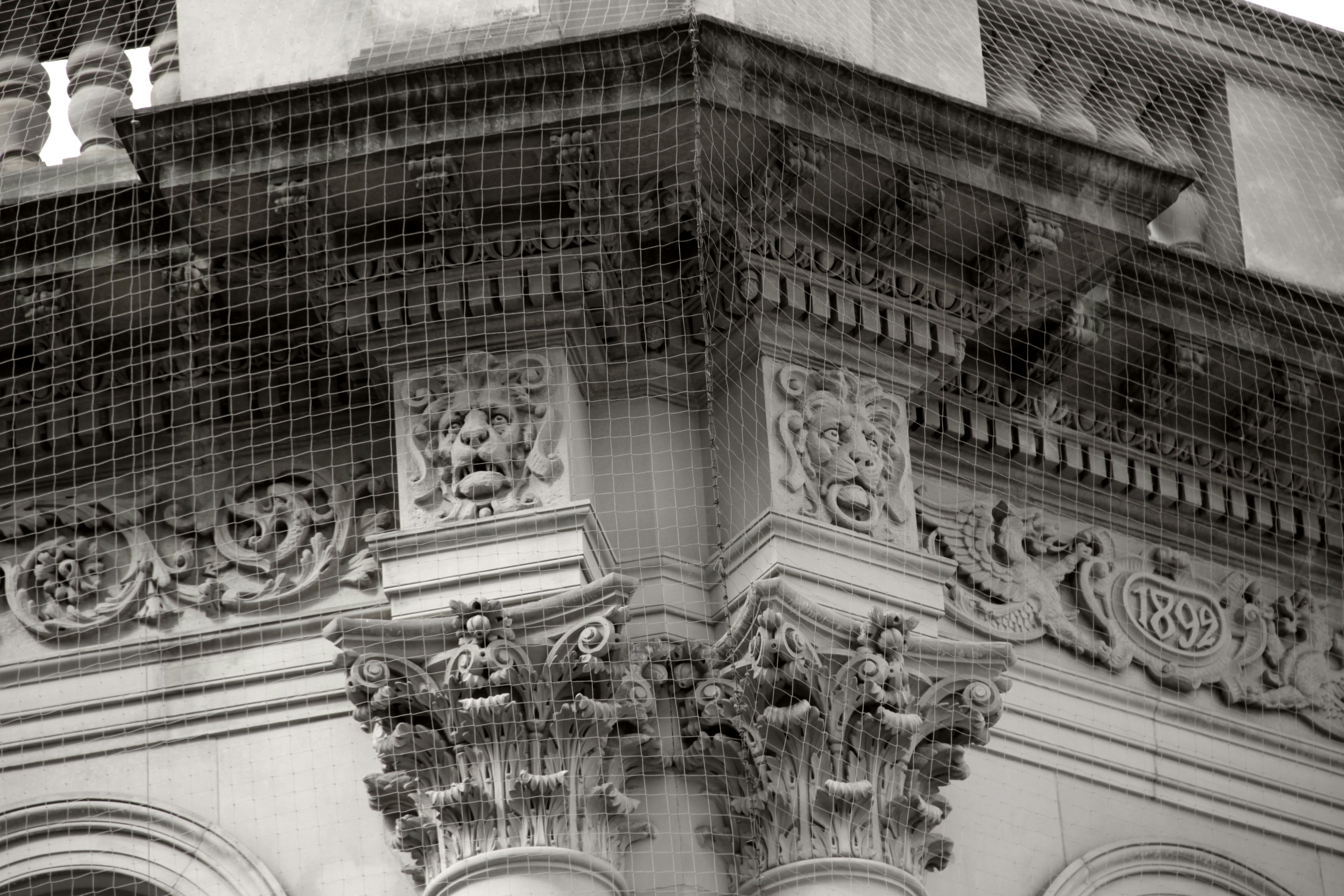
Capitals, 1892

=== Window, St John the Evangelist, Farsley, before 1894 ===
This stained glass crucifixion window is in St John the Evangelist Church, Farsley, West Yorkshire, a listed building. The window was found in Appleyard's Cookridge Road studio after his death. It had been designed and executed by him during his lifetime. It was possibly intended in memory of his parents who are buried in St John's churchyard, although his friends added a dedication to Appleyard's memory only. It was installed in June or July 1894. The windows of St John's were restored in 2015. (Note: For images of the window at St John the Evangelist, see: Category:St John Farsley, Appleyard window.)

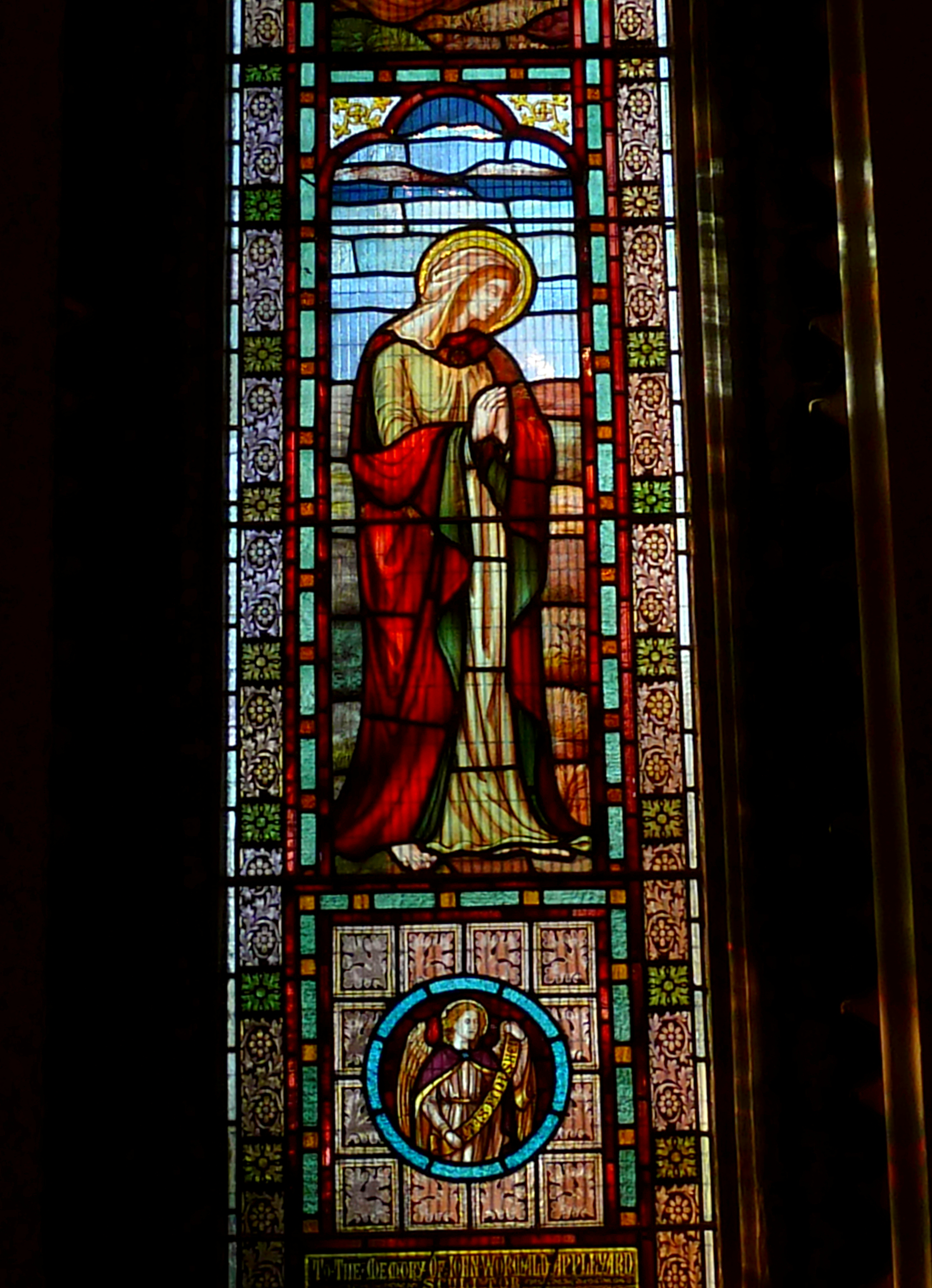
Appleyard window, before 1894

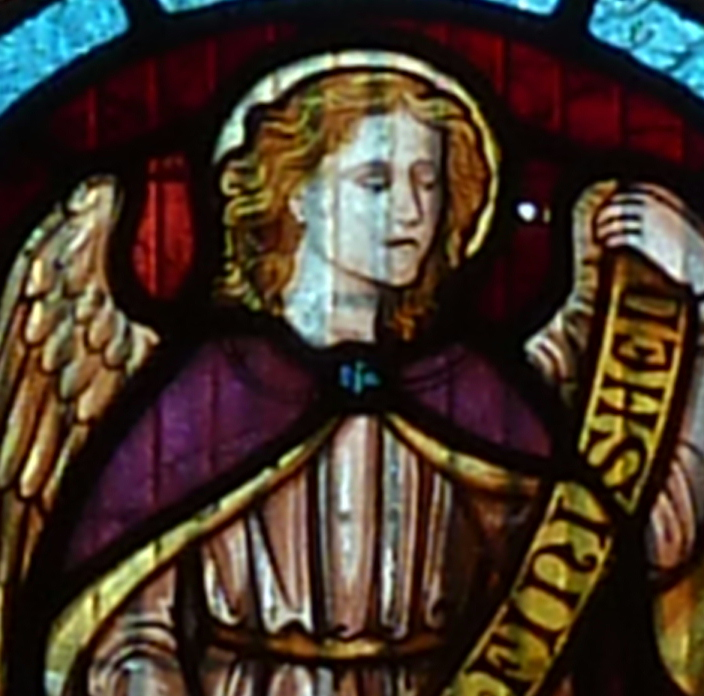
Appleyard window, detail

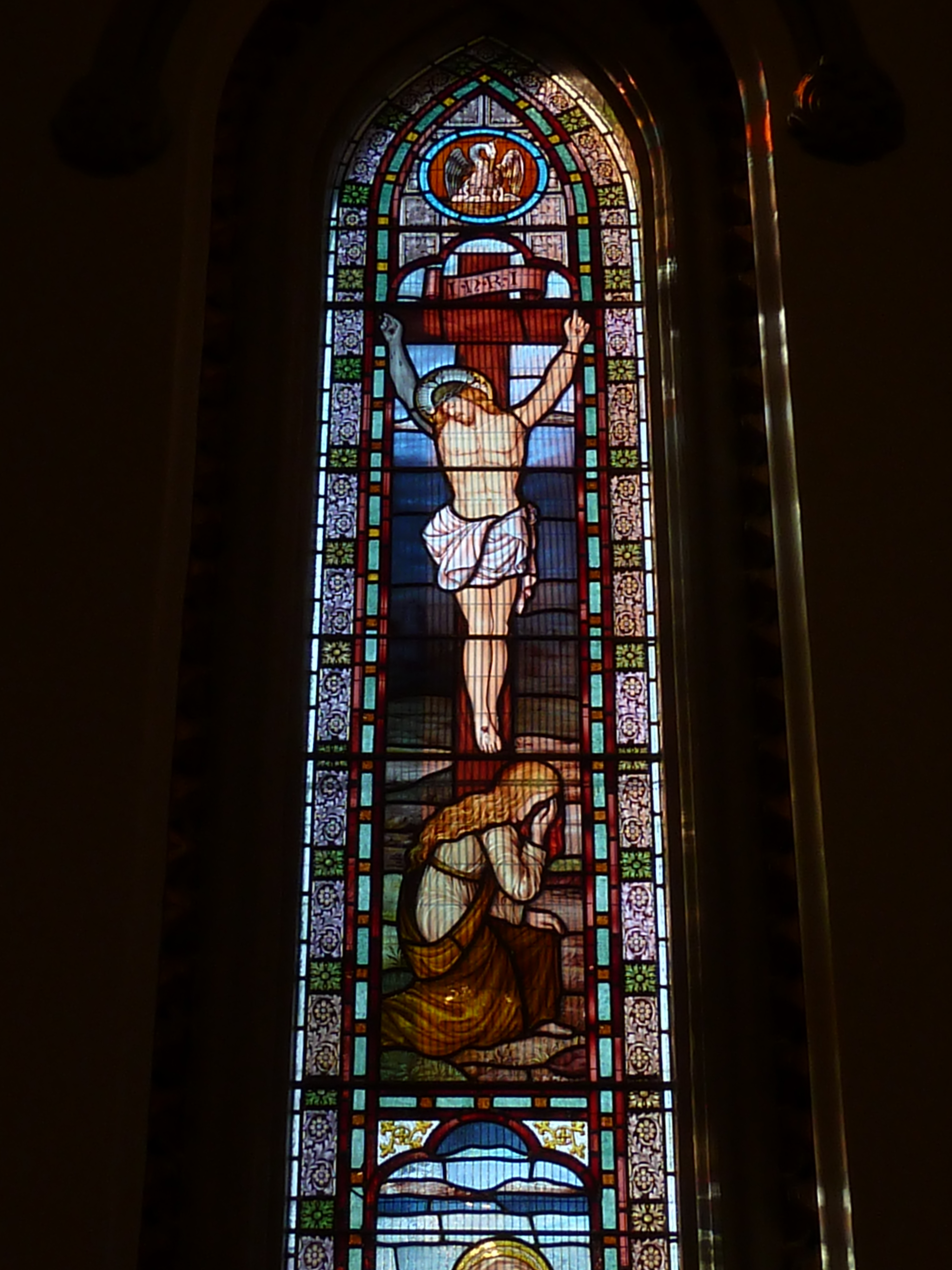
Appleyard window, crucifixion

=== Leeds School of Medicine, Thoresby Place, Leeds, 1891–1894 ===
This is a listed building. It was designed initially for 400 students, in "collegiate Tudor Gothic" by Leeds-born William Henry Thorp FRIBA (1852–1944), and completed in October 1894. In July 1890 when Thorp was appointed for this job, he was instructed to visit all the other new medical schools with a member of the Medical Board before beginning the design. So the building reflects his visits to London, Cambridge, Newcastle, Edinburgh, Glasgow and Dublin. The building stands in Thoresby Place, beside George Gilbert Scott's original frontage of Leeds General Infirmary. It has three storeys plus attics, and was built of local brick with Morley Moor sandstone dressings and terracotta details. The interior hall is lined with Mansfield stone. There are three coats of arms in the foyer, carved by Appleyard: the Royal College of Physicians, the Royal College of Surgeons and Victoria University. On the exterior there is a carved coat of arms over a window, "stone relief panel over second floor bays with angel holding shield," and gargoyles. "The outer porch is entered through an elaborately moulded archway, with traceried and curved spandrils, enriched with emblems of the Tudor rose and lily ... all the carved work, both in wood and stone, was executed by the late Mr J.W. Appleyard of Leeds." The design of the eye sockets and visible vertebrae of the grotesques here are key to the identification of Appleyard's own work on Headingley Hill Congregational Church, and the liondogs on the staircase of Leeds Central Library mentioned above. (Note: For images of Leeds School of Medicine, see: Category:Leeds School of Medicine, built 1894.)

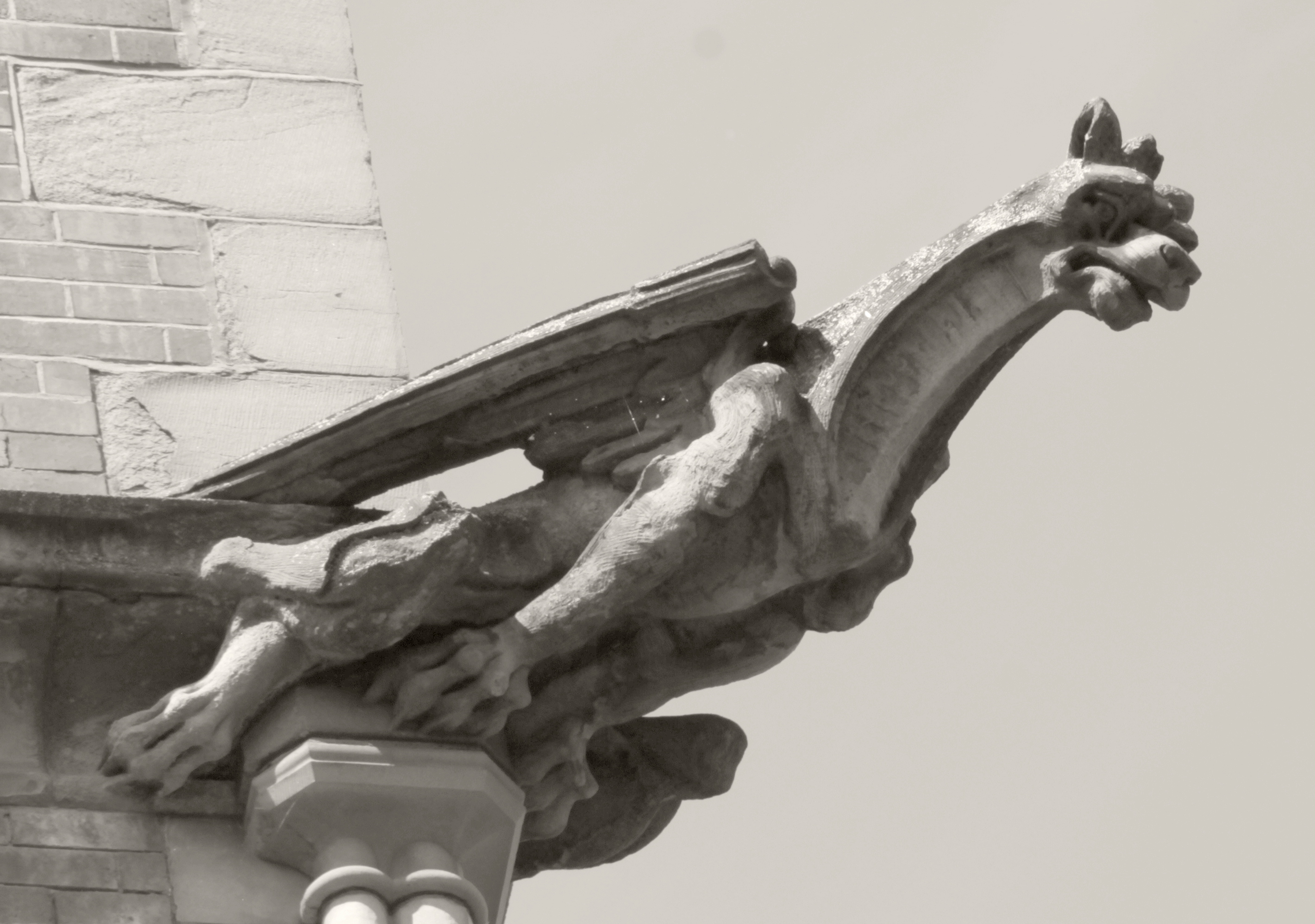
Faux gargoyle, a dragon, 1893

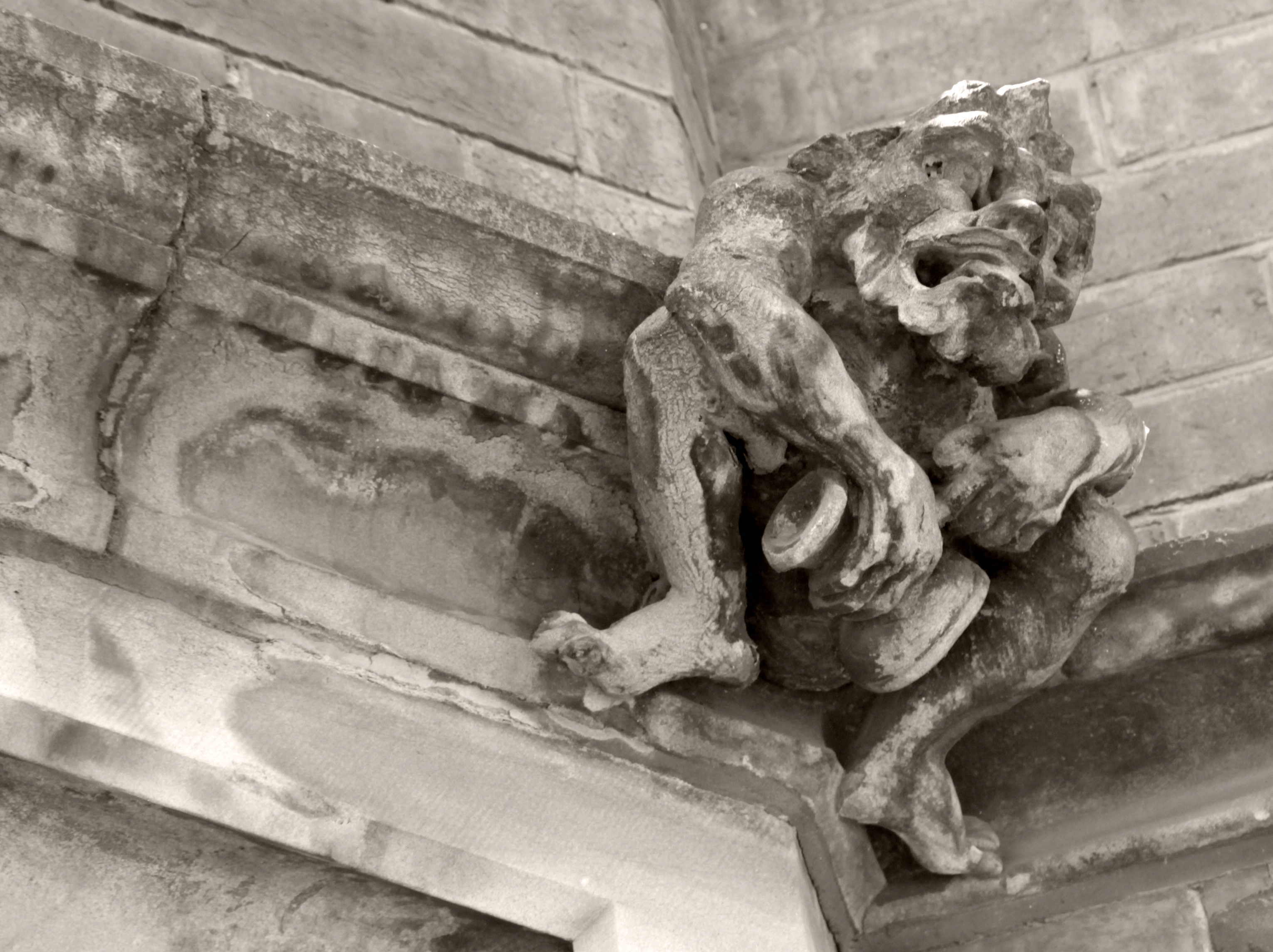
Grotesque, possible self-portrait, 1893

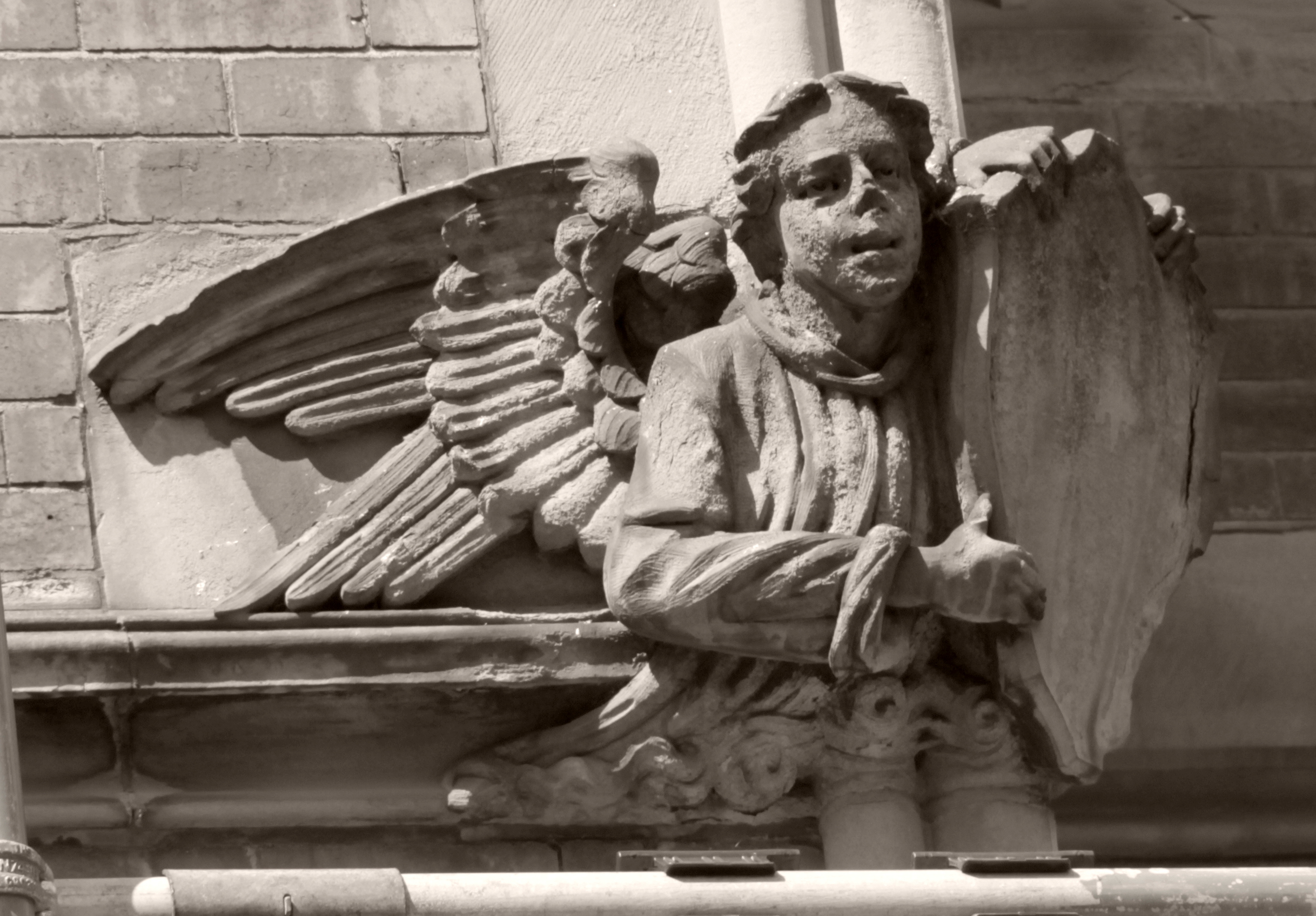
Angel, 1893

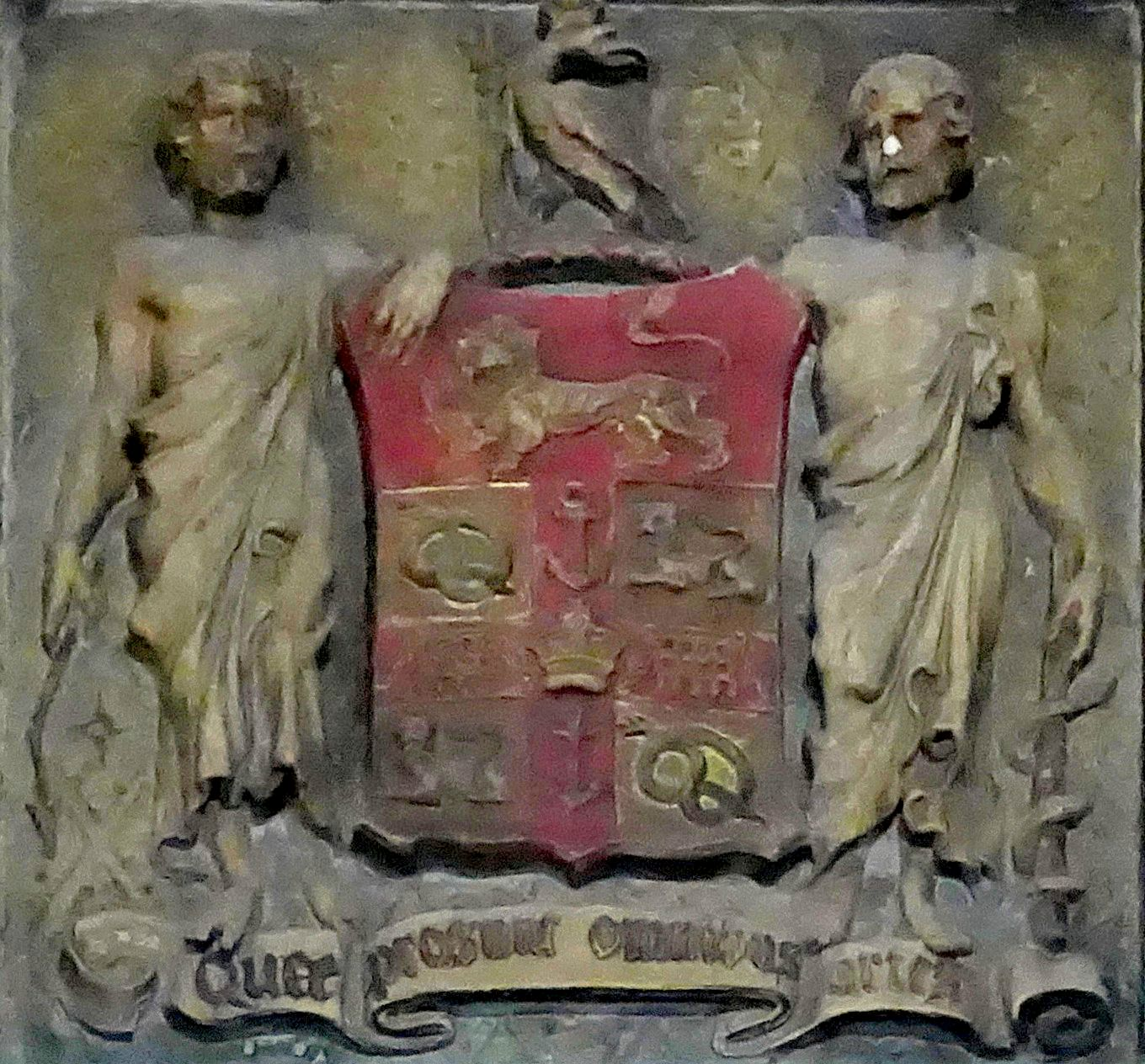
Arms of the Royal College of Surgeons, 1893.

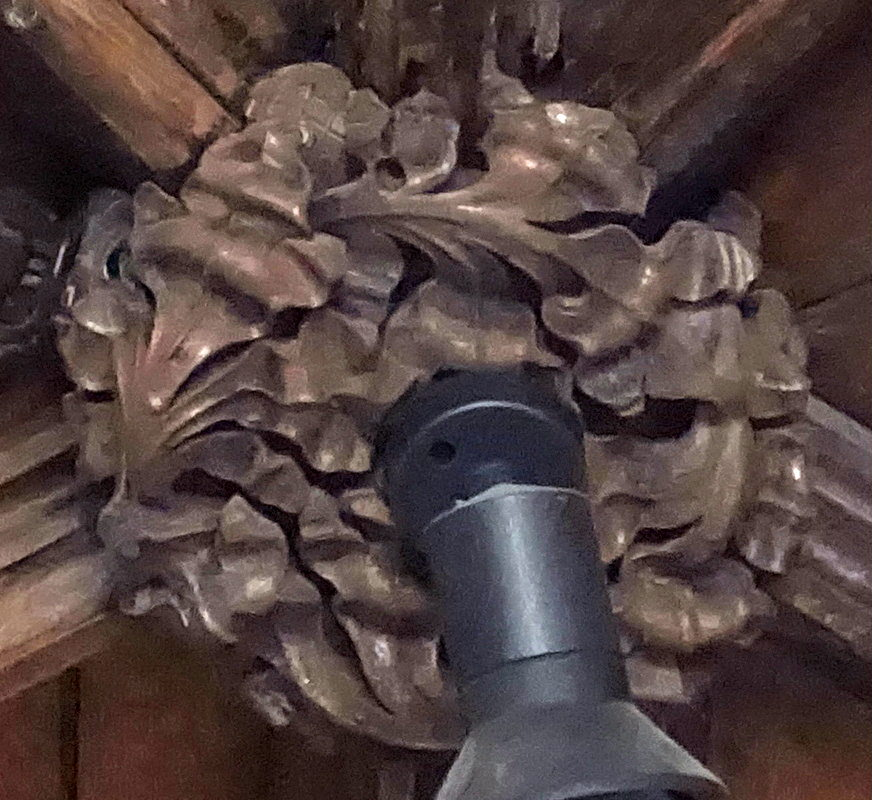
Carved wood ceiling boss, 1893

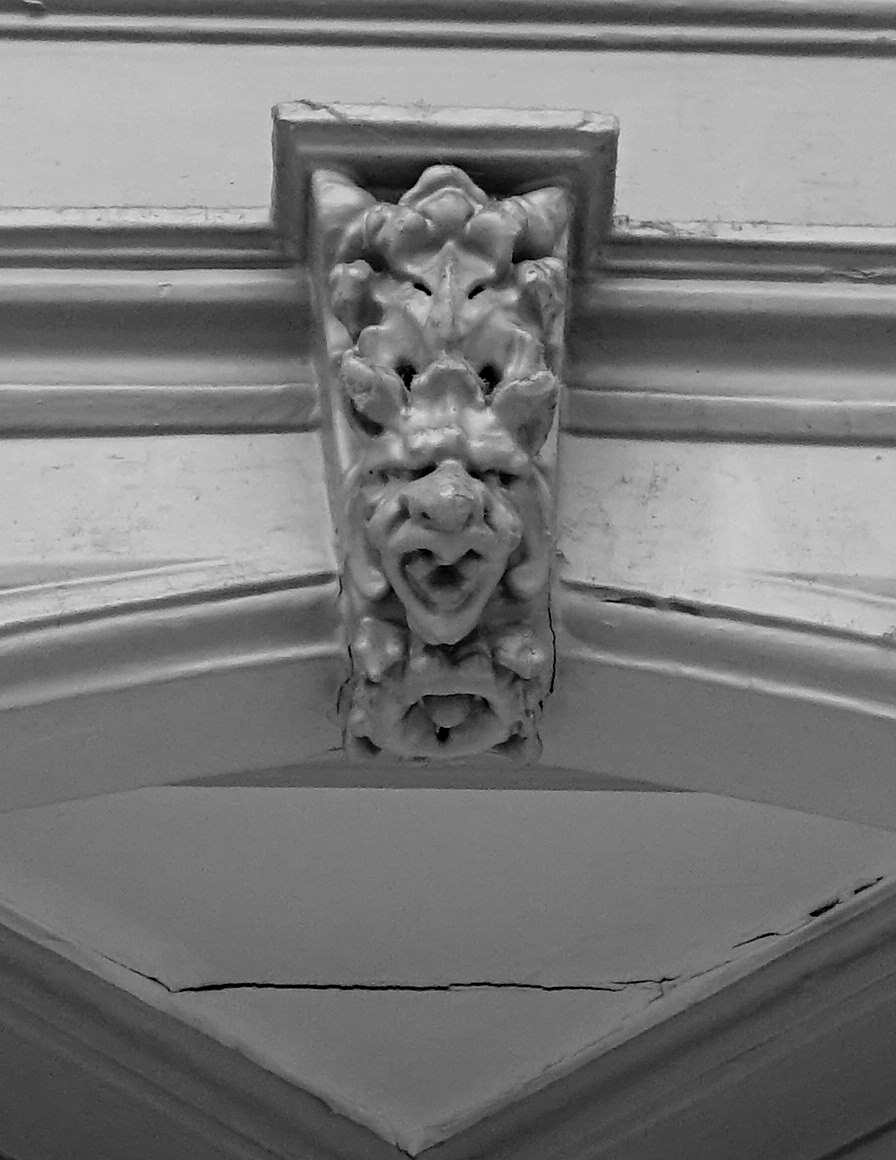
Carved wood faux keystone, 1893
