= Emily Ford (artist) =

English artist and campaigner (1850–1930)

Emily Susan Ford
- Born: 1851
- Died: 1930 (aged 78–79)
- Education: Slade School of Art
- Known for: Her religious paintings and campaigning for women's rights
- Style: Primitivist Italian
- Movement: Pre-Raphaelite

Emily Susan Ford (1850–1930) was an English artist and campaigner for women's rights. She was born into a Quaker family in Leeds, and trained as an artist at the Slade School of Art and exhibited at the Royal Academy.

== Life ==
Emily Ford was born in Leeds into a politically active Quaker family who moved to Adel Grange in Adel on the outskirts of Leeds when she was 15. Her parents were Robert Lawson Ford (1809–1878) a solicitor and Hannah (née Pease) (1814–1886). Her youngest sister Isabella became a prominent campaigner for the rights of working women. When in Leeds Emily lived at the family home, Adel Grange, but after her older sister Bessie died in 1922, Emily and Isabella moved to Adel Willows, a small property nearby.

Ford attended the Slade School of Art in London from 1875.

From 1873 until 1881 Ford was an active member of the Leeds Ladies' Educational Association, which provided lectures and courses, supervised Cambridge Local Examinations and with other local bodies founded Leeds Girls' High School. Ford was secretary of the association and in 1879 backed a series of lectures on the laws relating to women's property rights and custody of infants. The controversy surrounding these subjects split the association's membership and it was abandoned in 1881. Like other members of the association, such as Alice Cliff Scatcherd, Ford was a member of the Manchester Society for Women's Suffrage which was a hive for activism in the 1880s. The society formed strong links with the Manchester Society of Women Painters, of which Ford was a member. The society was active from 1879 until 1883 and had among its leading members suffragettes such as Susan Dacre, Annie Swynnerton and Jessie Toler Kingsley. Ford became vice-president of the Leeds Suffrage Society where she was an active member and speaker

In 1887 Ford and her sisters Isabella and Bessie became heavily involved in labour politics, focusing on the inequalities of capitalism, class and gender. Ford joined the Leeds Socialist League. Together with her sisters and Scatcherd she supported strikes of women weavers and the tailoresses in 1888 and 1889 with practical assistance and contributions towards the strike fund.

In the early 1880s Ford became interested in spiritualism and joined the Society for Psychical Research.

Ford's religious convictions, feminism and social politics underwent profound change. She converted to Anglicanism, abandoned socialism and instead of focusing on a wide range of issues that concerned women she focused her efforts on women's suffrage. She was baptised into the Anglican Church at All Souls, Blackman Lane Leeds in 1890. Ford then transferred her suffrage society membership to London and expressed the desire that her art works should be hung "where they could speak". By that time declamatory art by women artists had reached a wide audience outside the institutions of culture and scholarship through the women's suffrage banners.

== Work ==
Although Ford did not make a living from her work, her artistic career showed early promise when in 1879 she exhibited at the Dudley Gallery alongside works by Edward Burne-Jones and Edward Poynter. In the following decade her works were exhibited at the Royal Academy and Grosvenor Gallery, along with the 'Exhibition of Women's Industries' of 1885 in Bristol. Ford's early work was influenced by the Pre-Raphaelite movement particularly Burne-Jones. This style in her art coincided with her interest in spiritualism in the 1880s.

From the early 1880s Ford worked on 'The Sphere of Suffering' series for some twenty five years. The series traces the passage of the soul from the darkness of the abyss in to the light. Ford's work on this series coincides with her interest in spiritualism. Spiritualism subverted gendered conducts, and in doing so gave women a significant power and authority. It is therefore appropriate that when Philippa Fawcett was awarded the highest place in the Mathematical Tripos examination at Newnham College Cambridge in 1890, that her mother, Millicent Fawcett, presented the college with Rising Dawn, from Emily Ford's 'The Sphere of Suffering' series, to remember her daughter's achievement. The painting, which Ford later donated to the University of Leeds shows an allegorical figure with light rising behind her - a celebration of female achievement which heralded a bright new future. A tempera on canvas, it is similar to her other work from the series, The Soul Finding the Light (1888–89). This work depicts a female figure draped in deep blue robes who floats across a luminescent blue and gold backdrop. Deborah Cherry has claimed that the blue robes worn by 'the soul' echo those of the Virgin Mary, the intercessor between heaven and earth. For spiritualists colour invoked spiritual and emotional states and Ford emphasised that 'people must learn to see Spiritual truth as an artist must learn to see colour'.

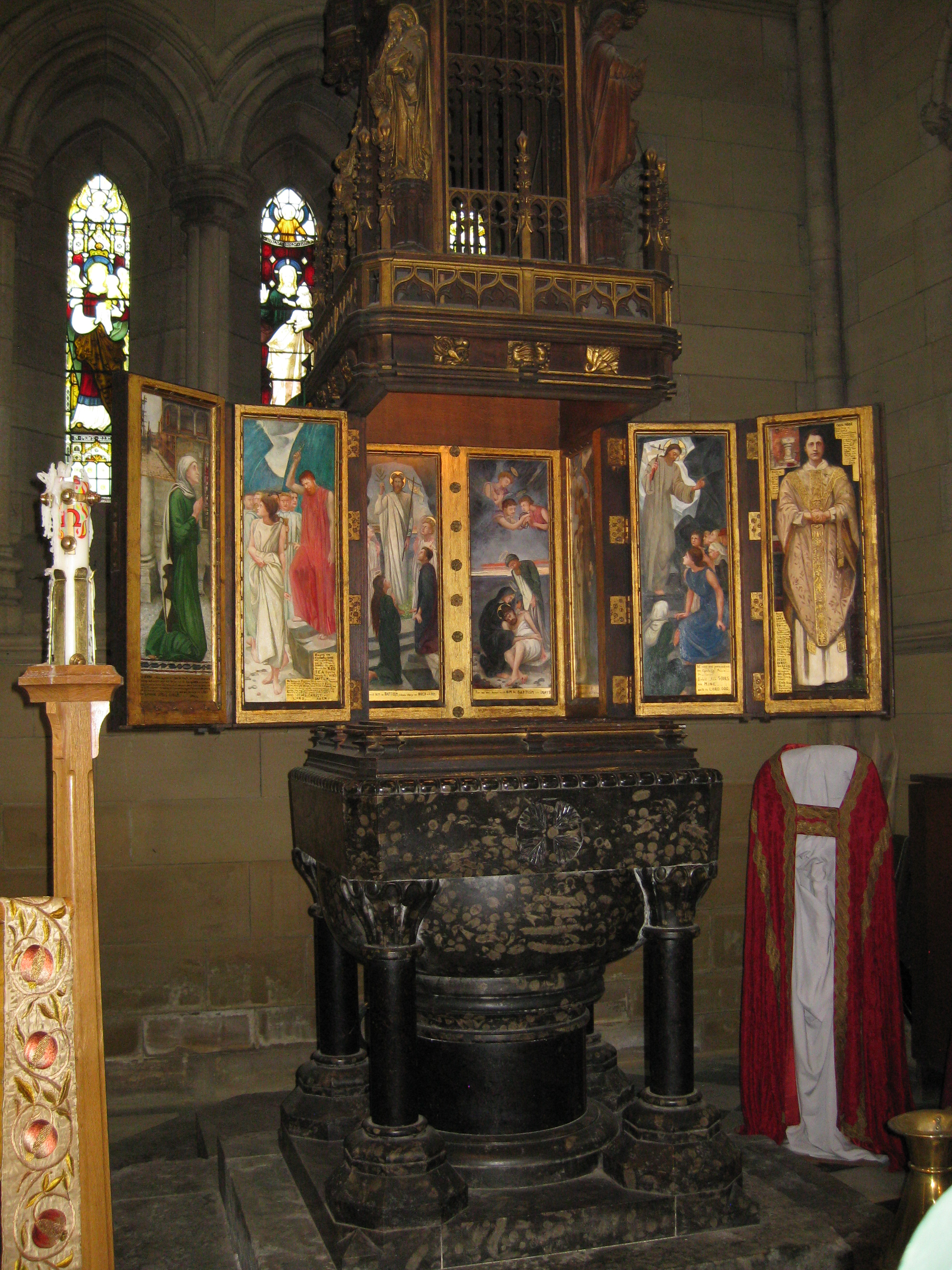
Panels painted by Emily Ford above the font in All Souls Church, Leeds.

Following her conversion to Anglicanism in 1890, Ford worked in an 'Italian Primitive' style and primarily devoted herself to religious art; painting frescoes and designing stained glass windows in Anglican churches with a more conventional Christian iconography. High Church Anglicanism flourished in Leeds and provided Ford with opportunities to unite her spiritual beliefs and artistic practice. After her baptism at All Souls' in 1891 she gave the church eight panel paintings which attached to a tall font canopy designed by R. J. Johnson of Newcastle. Painted in a primitivist Italian style, they depict scenes from the Bible but the figures themselves are portraits of people she knew, clerics, the church's congregation and herself. They also include a significant number of women which held both local and national importance. Amongst them are the women's rights advocates Emelia Russell Gurney and Lady Mount Temple. Having not been cleaned the works fell in to a very poor state of repair, however following fundraising and the intervention of the Victorian Society the paintings were restored in 2014. Ford's religious art works had once decorated numerous churches throughout England, unfortunately the majority have not survived due to demolition or changing tastes.

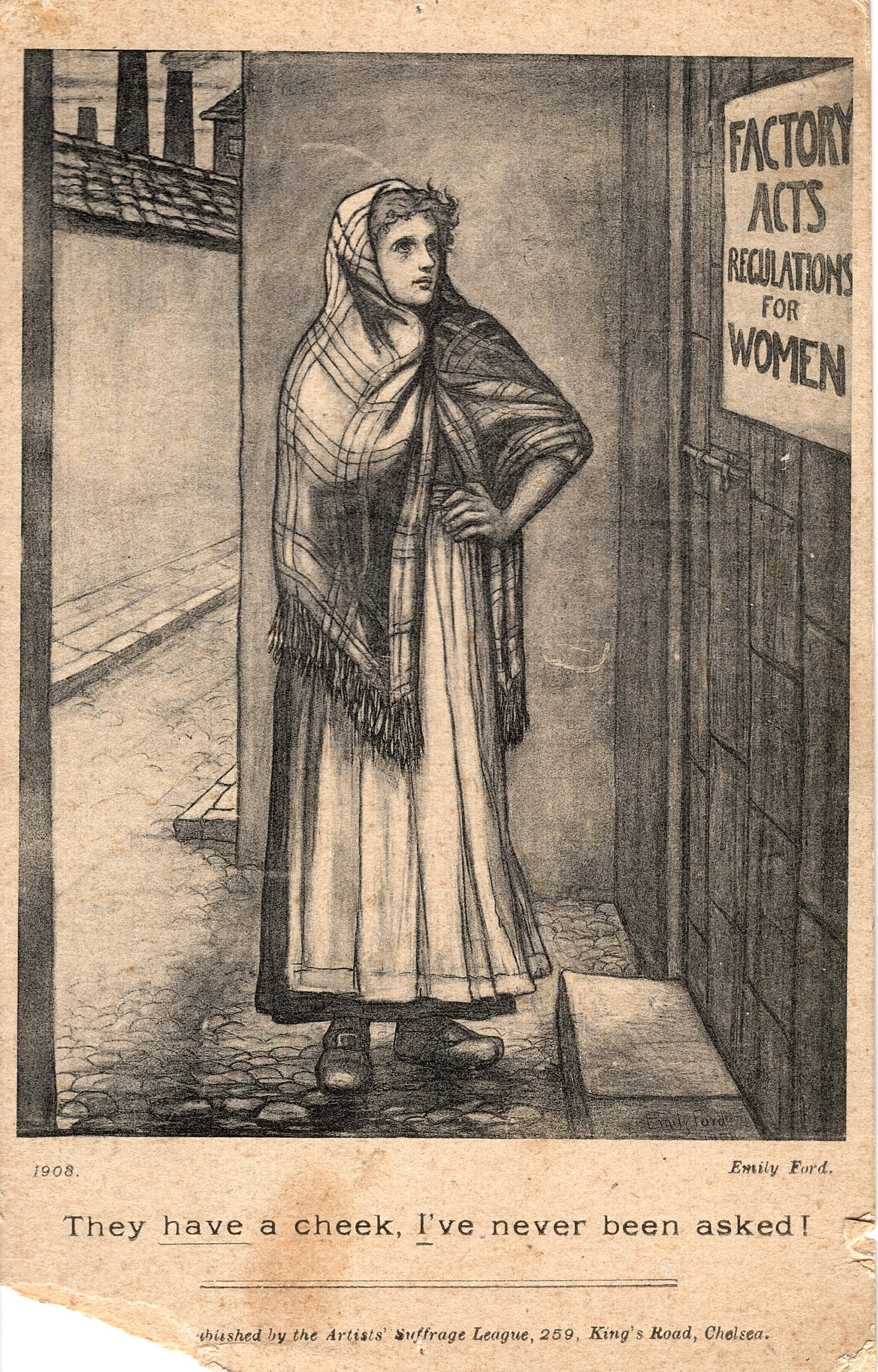
"They have a cheek, I've never been asked!" Emily Ford's postcard from 1908 for the Artists' Suffrage League

1905 saw the upsurge in the women's suffrage movement, and with it Ford returned to political activism. Ford had a studio in Chelsea that was described by fellow artist, Dora Meeson as "a meeting ground for artists, suffragists, people who "did" things". Later, as vice-president of the Artists' Suffrage League, she used her talent to promote the suffrage cause. In 1908 she designed They Have a Cheek I've Never Been Asked. The image refers to powerless women employed in factories and their oppression. The poster was used as a means to promote the cause of the National Union of Women's Suffrage Societies and their bid to improve the conditions of working-class women. She continued to devote herself to religious art designing stained glass windows and painting murals, but also produced posters, banners and shields for the suffrage movements.

In 1916 Ford presented a number of works to the University of Leeds. Amongst these works were her monumental depictions of sibyls. The sibyls were seen as women of intense and considerable mental power, which shared a close proximity to the divine. Ford requested that these paintings be displayed 'where they could speak'. They now look over the university's ceremonial events and degree ceremonies as they hang above the platform in the Great Hall.

== Collections ==
- The Hepworth Wakefield
- The Stanley & Audrey Burton Gallery, University of Leeds
- National Trust for Scotland, Haddo House

== Tribute ==
Ford's name is one of those featured on the sculpture Ribbons, unveiled in 2024.
