= Listed buildings in Leeds (Hyde Park and Woodhouse) =

Hyde Park and Woodhouse are areas in the metropolitan borough of the City of Leeds, West Yorkshire, England. The areas contain 149 listed buildings that are recorded in the National Heritage List for England. Of these, five are listed at Grade II*, the middle of the three grades, and the others are at Grade II, the lowest grade. The areas are largely residential, and also contain the University of Leeds. Many of the university buildings are listed, some of which are newly built, and others have been converted from pre-existing buildings. Most of the other listed buildings are houses and associated structures, and the rest include churches and memorials in churchyards, a public house, statues and other memorials, buildings in the former Woodhouse Cemetery, schools and associated structures, a cross, and public buildings.

== Key ==
Grade	Criteria
II*	Particularly important buildings of more than special interest
II	Buildings of national importance and special interest

== Buildings ==
Name and location	Photograph	Date	Notes	Grade
5 Woodhouse Cliff; 53.81594°N 1.55958°W	—	Late 17th century	A house in gritstone on a plinth, with quoins, a sill band, an eaves band and blocking course, and a stone slate roof with coped gables. There are two storeys and four bays. The doorway has a plain surround and a fanlight, and the window above is a sash with a single light, a Gibbs surround, and a keystone. The other windows are mullioned, in the ground floor they are sashes, and in the upper floor they are casements.	II
Woodhouse Hall; 53.80284°N 1.55720°W		c. 1740	A house that was later extended, altered and restored, and used for other purposes. It is in red brick with stone dressings, a slate roof, and two or three storeys over a basement. The east entrance front has quoins, a modillion cornice, and a hipped roof. There are five bays, and steps lead up to a porch with pillars and an entablature, a cornice, and a pierced parapet, and a doorway with an architrave and a fanlight. The windows have architraves, and the window above the doorway also has a cornice and a balcony. The south garden front has three storeys and eight bays. In the outer bays are canted two-storey bay windows, and there is a round-arched stair window. To the right is a later two-storey five-bay wing.	II
Claremont and wall 53.80244°N 1.55787°W		1772	The house was extended in 1856 by George Corson, and has been used later for other purposes. It is in red brick with stone dressings, a sill band, a modillion eaves cornice, and a hipped roof in slate and stone. There are two storeys and cellars, a south front of five bays, and a rear service range. The south front has a pediment over the middle three bays containing a circular window. In the centre is a projecting porch with Tuscan three-quarter columns, and a pediment. To the right, the projecting bays contain a coat of arms. In the left return is a doorway with a traceried fanlight, and the right return contains two bay windows, one canted, the other square. The other windows are sashes. The boundary wall is in red brick with stone coping.	II
Denison Hall; 53.80227°N 1.55977°W		1786	A large house in stone with hipped slate roofs, in Classical style. The south front facing the garden has a block of three storeys, and five bays, two-storey flanking wings, and a recessed two-storey wing on the left. The entrance front is on the right return and has three bays. The garden front has four giant Ionic pilasters, a string course, an entablature, a moulded eaves cornice, a pediment containing swags in the tympanum, and urn finials. The windows are sashes, the middle three in the ground floor in semicircular recesses. The flanking bays are bowed, each with a blind balustraded parapet. In the entrance front is a central doorway with attached Doric columns, a carved entablature, and a pediment. Above it is a Venetian window, a moulded cornice, and a parapet ramped up in the centre.	II*
Belle Vue House; 53.80177°N 1.56243°W		1792	A house, later divided into flats, it is in red brick on a stone plinth, with sill bands, a modillion cornice, a parapet, and a hipped slate roof. There are two storeys and a cellar, and a front of five bays, the middle three bays projecting under a pediment containing an elliptical window in the tympanum. The central doorway has a moulded architrave, a fanlight, a fluted frieze, and a pediment on console brackets. The windows are sashes, and at the rear is a Palladian stair window.	II
Springfield House; 53.80411°N 1.55680°W	—	1792	A house, later used by the university, it is in red brick with stone dressings, on a stone plinth, with a sill band, and a hipped slate roof. There are two storeys and five bays, the middle three bays projecting under a pediment. The central doorway has three-quarter Tuscan columns, a semicircular fanlight, an entablature, and a dentilled pediment. The windows are sashes with flat brick arches, and between the floors are rectangular recessed panels.	II
Beech Grove House; 53.80722°N 1.55573°W		1799	A house that was altered and later used by the university, it is in stone with a sill band and a hipped slate roof. There are two storeys and an attic, three bays on the front and seven on the sides. In the centre of the front is a round-arched porch with attached columns and a moulded cornice. The windows are sashes, the window above the doorway with an architrave, between the windows in the outer bays are recessed panels, and in the left return is a wide semicircular bay window.	II
7 and 8 Blenheim Square and railings 53.80855°N 1.54779°W		1822–31	A pair of houses in a terrace in red-brown brick with stone dressings and a slate roof. There are three storeys and basements, and each house has three bays. Steps lead up to a doorway in the right bay that has a plain surround, a semicircular fanlight, imposts, and a keystone. The windows are a mix of sashes and casements, the basement windows have segmental heads, and the others have flat brick arches. The railings enclosing the basement areas and flanking the steps are in wrought iron.	II
9 and 10 Blenheim Square and 17 and 19 Leicester Grove; 53.80862°N 1.54793°W		1822–31	A pair of houses in a terrace, in red brick with stone dressings and a slate roof. There are three storeys and basements, and each house has three bays. Steps with railings lead up to a doorway in the right bay with a plain surround, a semicircular fanlight, imposts, and a keystone. The basement windows have segmental heads, and the other windows have flat brick arches.	II
11 and 12 Blenheim Square and railings 53.80870°N 1.54810°W		1822–31	A pair of houses in a terrace in red-brown brick with stone dressings and a slate roof. There are three storeys and basements, and each house has three bays. Steps lead up to a doorway in the right bay that has a plain surround, a semicircular fanlight, imposts, and a keystone. The basement windows have segmental heads, and the others have flat brick arches. At the rear are stair windows and a semicircular bay window. The railings enclosing the basement areas and flanking the steps are in wrought iron.	II
13 and 14 Blenheim Square and railings 53.80879°N 1.54827°W		1822–31	A pair of houses at the end of a terrace in red-brown brick with stone dressings, dentilled eaves, and a slate roof. There are three storeys and basements, and each house has three bays. Steps lead up to a doorway in the right bay that has a plain surround, a semicircular fanlight, imposts, and a keystone. The basement windows have segmental heads, and the others have flat brick arches. At the rear are round-arched stair windows and a bow window. The railings enclosing the basement areas and flanking the steps are in wrought iron.	II
37 and 38 Hanover Square; 53.80090°N 1.56054°W		c 1823	A pair of semi-detached houses in red brick, with stone dressings, a sill band, a moulded eaves cornice, and a slate roof. There are three storeys and a basement, and six bays. In the centre, steps lead up to a shallow portico that has two pairs of Tuscan columns, an entablature, a cornice, and a blocking course. Most of the windows are sashes, those in the ground floor with panelled aprons.	II
39 and 40 Hanover Square; 53.80105°N 1.56058°W		c. 1823	A pair of semi-detached houses in red brick, with stone dressings, on a plinth, with a sill band, an eaves cornice, and a slate roof. There are three storeys and a basement, and seven bays. The doorways have architraves, fanlights, and cornices on console brackets. Most of the windows are sashes, those in the ground floor with panelled aprons.	II
St Mark's Church; 53.81200°N 1.55340°W		1823–26	A Commissioners' Church in Gothic Revival style, it is built in stone with a slate roof. The church consists of a nave, a chancel, north and south aisles, and a west tower. The tower has three stages, a west doorway, angle buttresses with gabled heads rising to tall octagonal pinnacles, two-light belfry windows with Perpendicular tracery, and a plain parapet with moulded coping. The east window has five lights.	II
20 Blenheim Terrace; 53.80734°N 1.55103°W		1824–26	A house in a terrace, later used for other purposes, it is rendered, with a slate roof, three storeys and four bays. In the outer bays are round-arched openings, with moulded architraves, fanlights, and keystones, the left with an inserted cash machine, the right a doorway. In the second bay is a 20th-century bay window, and the other windows are sashes.	II
13, 14 and 15 Beech Grove Terrace; 53.80717°N 1.55476°W	—	1825	A terrace of three houses, later used by the university, in red brick with stone dressings, a sill band, and a slate mansard roof with coped gables. There are three storeys, attics and a basement, and nine bays. On the front are two doorways with semicircular fanlights, pilasters, and entablatures. The windows are sashes with flat brick arches.	II
11 and 13 Lyddon Terrace and railings 53.80682°N 1.55991°W		1825	A pair of houses in a terrace, in red brick, with stone dressings and a slate roof. There are three storeys and basements, and both houses have five bays. In each house, steps lead up to a central doorway that has Doric half-columns, a semicircular fanlight, and an open pediment. Some windows are sashes, and others have been replaced. The basement areas are enclosed, and the steps are flanked by wrought iron railings.	II
Churchyard wall, railings, gate piers, and steps 53.81177°N 1.55366°W		c. 1825 (probable)	The wall that encloses the churchyard of St Mark's Church is in stone, with some chamfered coping, and along the south side are wrought iron railings. On the north side are stone steps in dogleg form. At the entrance to the churchyard are stone octagonal gate piers with embattled capstones.	II
5 Kingston Terrace; 53.80974°N 1.55320°W		Early 19th century	A red brick house with stone dressings, bracketed eaves, and a pantile roof. There are two storeys, a basement and attics, and three bays. Five steps lead up to a round-arched doorway that has an architrave, attached columns, a fanlight, and a keystone. The windows are small-paned, and there are three gabled dormers.	II
1 and 2 Woodhouse Cliff; 53.81606°N 1.56015°W		Early 19th century	A pair of stone houses in a terrace with a slate roof. There are three storeys and basements, and each house has three bays. In each house, steps lead up to a doorway with a fanlight in the left bay, and the windows are sashes.	II
3 and 4 Woodhouse Cliff; 53.81603°N 1.55995°W		Early 19th century	A pair of stone houses in a terrace with a slate roof. There are three storeys and attics, and each house has three bays. In each house, steps lead up to a doorway with a fanlight and a flat hood on shaped brackets in the left bay. The windows are sashes, and each house has a gabled dormer.	II
Gate piers, Denison Hall; 53.80249°N 1.55916°W	—	Early 19th century	The gate piers at the entrance to the hall are in stone, on a plinth, square, and about 2 metres (6 ft 7 in) high. Each pier has an incised panel and a pedimented capstone.	II
1–4 Kingston Terrace; 53.80959°N 1.55334°W		1826	A terrace of four houses in red brick with stone dressings, bracketed eaves and a slate roof with a coped gable at the left end. There are three storeys, and each house has two bays and a rear wing. Steps lead up to the doorways in the left bay, each with pilasters and a fanlight with radial glazing bars. Most of the windows are sashes, and at the rear are round-arched staircase windows in moulded frames.	II
Gate piers and walls, Kingston Terrace; 53.80934°N 1.55326°W		c. 1826	The walls at the entrance to the terrace are in gritstone with rounded coping, and are about 1.5 metres (4 ft 11 in) high. The gate piers are in stone, square and about 2 metres (6 ft 7 in) high. Each pier has an entablature, a cornice, and a shallow pyramidal capstone.	II
11 Hanover Square and railings 53.80194°N 1.55869°W		1826–30	A house at the end of a terrace, it is in red brick on a stone plinth, with stone dressings, a sill band, and a slate roof with coped gables. There are three storeys at the front, four at the rear, basements and attics, and six bays. Steps lead to the doorway that has a moulded architrave, a fanlight, and a cornice on console brackets. The windows are sashes, those in the ground floor with recessed aprons. In the left return is a semicircular attic window, and the basement area is enclosed by railings.	II
2 Blenheim Terrace and wall 53.80639°N 1.54940°W		1830	A house at the end of a terrace, later an office, in red brick with a slate roof. There are three storeys and a basement, and two bays. In the left bay is a round-arched doorway with a moulded architrave, a fanlight, and a keystone. The windows are sashes with flat brick arches. On the south side of the boundary is a brick wall with flat stone coping, about 1 metre (3 ft 3 in) high and 25 metres (82 ft) long.	II
3 and 4 Blenheim Terrace, gate piers and walls 53.80646°N 1.54953°W		1830	A pair of houses in a terrace, later offices, in red brick, with stone dressings and a slate roof. There are three storeys and basements, and each house has two bays. The doorways are in the left bay, each with a moulded architrave, a semicircular fanlight, and a keystone. The windows are sashes with flat brick arches. At the entrance are two square stone gate piers about 2 metres (6 ft 7 in) high, with cornices and shallow pyramidal capstones. These are linked to the houses by brick walls about 0.75 metres (2 ft 6 in) high with stçone coping.	II
Waverley House; 53.80139°N 1.55738°W		c. 1830	A house on a corner site, later an office, it is in red brick with stone dressings, bands, a narrow pediment, and a slate roof. There are three storeys and a basement, six bays on the front, and five on the left return, the right three bays gabled. The doorway on the front has pilasters, a fanlight and a cornice. The windows are casements in the style of sashes. In the left return is a doorway with pilasters, a fanlight, and a cornice on shaped consoles.	II
1 and 2 Blenheim Square and 31 Blackman Lane and railings 53.80830°N 1.54731°W		1831–39	A pair of houses at the end of a terrace in red-brown brick, with stone dressings and a slate roof. There are three storeys and basements, and each house has three bays. Steps lead up to a round-arched doorway in the right bay of each house that has imposts, a fanlight containing roundels, and a keystone. The windows are sashes, in the basement they have segmental heads and elsewhere the heads are flat. At the rear are round-arched stair windows, and in the right return is a shop entrance. No. 1 has wrought iron railings enclosing the basement area and flanking the steps.	II
3 and 4 Blenheim Square and railings 53.80838°N 1.54748°W		1831–39	A pair of houses in a terrace in red-brown brick, with stone dressings and a slate roof. There are three storeys and basements, and each house has three bays. Steps lead up to a round-arched doorway in the right bay of each house that has imposts, a fanlight, and a keystone. The windows are a mix of sashes and casements with flat brick arches. At the rear are round-arched stair windows, and wrought iron railings enclose the basement areas and flank the steps.	II
5 and 6 Blenheim Square and railings 53.80847°N 1.54764°W		1831–39	A pair of houses in a terrace in red-brown brick, with stone dressings and a slate roof. There are three storeys and basements, and each house has three bays. Steps lead up to a round-arched doorway in the right bay of each house that has imposts, a fanlight containing roundels, and a keystone. The windows are sashes, in the basement they have segmental heads and elsewhere the heads are flat. At the rear is a stair window, and wrought iron railings enclose the basement areas and flank the steps.	II
Cemetery wall with blocked gateway 53.80954°N 1.55725°W	—	1832–34	The wall along the north and northwest sides of the former Leeds General Cemetery is in gritstone with pedimented coping, and is about 3 metres (9.8 ft) high. Near the mid-point on the northwest side is a blocked gateway with tapering jamb stones carrying a massive shaped lintel.	II
Façade to Burial Vaults, St George's Fields; 53.80855°N 1.55648°W		1832–34	The façade to the burial vault is in gritstone, and is about 10 metres (33 ft) long and 2 metres (6 ft 7 in) high. It contains six rusticated flat blocked aches, with pilasters, an entablature, a cornice, and a two-course parapet.	II
5 and 6 Blenheim Terrace, gate piers and walls 53.80655°N 1.54969°W		1834–39	A pair of houses in a terrace, later offices, in red brick, with stone dressings and a slate roof. There are three storeys and basements, and each house has two bays. The doorways are in the left bay, each with an architrave, a semicircular fanlight, and a keystone. In the left house is a stuccoed canted bay window rising from the basement, and the right house has a porch and a square bay window. The other windows are sashes with flat brick arches. At the entrance are two square stone gate piers about 2 metres (6 ft 7 in) high, with cornices and shallow pyramidal capstones. There are rendered forecourt walls at the front and on the north side with stone copings.	II
7 and 8 Blenheim Terrace, gate piers and walls 53.80664°N 1.54985°W		1834–39	A pair of houses in a terrace, later offices, in red brick, with stone dressings and a slate roof. There are three storeys and basements, and each house has two bays. The doorways are in the left bay, each with an architrave, a semicircular fanlight, and a keystone. The windows have flat brick arches, and are casements or small-pane sashes. At the entrance are two square stone gate piers about 2 metres (6 ft 7 in) high, with cornices and shallow pyramidal capstones. They are flanked by brick walls with stone coping that also run along the north side of the forecourt.	II
9 and 10 Blenheim Terrace, gate piers and walls 53.80673°N 1.55001°W		1834–39	A pair of houses in a terrace, later offices, in red brick, with stone dressings, bracketed eaves, and a slate roof. There are three storeys and basements, and each house has two bays. The doorways are in the left bay, each with an architrave, a semicircular fanlight, and a keystone. The windows have flat brick arches, and are casements or sashes. At the entrance are two square stone gate piers about 2 metres (6 ft 7 in) high, with cornices and shallow pyramidal capstones. They are flanked by brick walls with stone coping that also run along the north side of the forecourt.	II
11 and 12 Blenheim Terrace, gate piers and walls 53.80683°N 1.55016°W		1834–39	A pair of houses in a terrace, later offices, in red brick, with stone dressings, bracketed eaves, and a pantile roof. There are three storeys and basements, and each house has two bays. The doorways are in the left bay, each with an architrave, a semicircular fanlight, and a keystone. The windows have flat brick arches, and are small-pane sashes. At the entrance are two square stone gate piers, with cornices and shallow pyramidal capstones. They are flanked by brick walls about 1 metre (3 ft 3 in) high, with stone coping that also run along the north side of the forecourt.	II
13 and 14 Blenheim Terrace, gate piers and walls 53.80693°N 1.55033°W		1834–39	A pair of houses in a terrace, later offices, in red brick, with stone dressings, and a slate roof. There are three storeys and basements, and each house has two bays. The doorways are in the left bay, each with an architrave, a semicircular fanlight, and a keystone. The windows have flat brick arches, and are sashes. At the entrance are two square stone gate piers about 2 metres (6 ft 7 in) high, with cornices and shallow pyramidal capstones. They are flanked by brick walls about 1 metre (3 ft 3 in) high, with stone coping that also run along the north side of the forecourt.	II
15 Blenheim Terrace, gate piers and walls 53.80702°N 1.55047°W		1834–39	A house in a terrace, later an office, in red brick, the basement and dressings in stone, with a moulded eaves cornice, and a slate roof. There are two storeys, a basement, and an added attic, and five bays. A flight of ten steps with railings leads up to a doorway with pilasters, a fanlight, an entablature, a dentilled cornice and a moulded pediment. The windows are sashes with flat brick arches, and in the attic are 20th-century dormers. At the entrance are two square stone gate piers about 2 metres (6 ft 7 in) high, tapering, and with pedimented capstones and laurel leaf motifs. They are flanked by brick walls with moulded coping that also run along the north side of the forecourt.	II
16 Blenheim Terrace, gate piers and walls 53.80709°N 1.55062°W		1834–39	A house in a terrace, later an office, in red brick, the basement and dressings in stone, with bands, an eaves cornice and blocking course, and a slate roof. There are two storeys, a basement, and an added attic, and five bays. A flight of steps with railings leads up to a porch with fluted columns, a fanlight, an entablature, a dentilled cornice and a pediment. The windows are sashes with flat brick arches, and in the attic are 20th-century dormers. At the entrance are the bases of two square stone gate piers, flanked by brick walls with moulded coping that also run along the north side of the forecourt.	II
17 Blenheim Terrace, gate piers and walls 53.80719°N 1.55074°W		1834–39	A house in a terrace, later an office, in red brick, the basement and dressings in stone, with bands, an eaves cornice and blocking course, and a slate roof. There are two storeys, a basement, and an added attic, and five bays. A flight of steps with railings leads up to a doorway with fluted columns, a fanlight, an entablature, and a pediment. The windows are sashes with flat brick arches, and in the attic are 20th-century dormers. At the entrance are two square stone gate piers about 2 metres (6 ft 7 in) high, tapering, and with pedimented capstones and laurel leaf motifs. They are flanked by brick walls with moulded coping that also run along the north side of the forecourt.	II
18 Blenheim Terrace, gate piers and walls 53.80727°N 1.55090°W		1834–39	A house in a terrace, later an office, in red brick, with stone dressings, bands, and a slate roof. There are two storeys, a basement, and five bays. Flights of steps lead up to a central doorway with fluted columns, a fanlight, an entablature, and a pediment. The windows are sashes with flat brick arches. At the entrance are two square stone gate piers about 2 metres (6 ft 7 in) high, tapering, and with pedimented capstones and laurel leaf motifs. They are flanked by brick walls with moulded coping that also run along the north side of the forecourt.	II
22 Blenheim Terrace; 53.80753°N 1.55132°W	—	1834–39	A pair of houses in a terrace, later offices, in red brick, with a slate roof, and three storeys, and each house has three bays. Steps lead up to doorways in the left bays, each with a moulded architrave, a fanlight, and a cornice, and the windows are sashes.	II
Former Cemetery Chapel and statue 53.80868°N 1.55666°W		1835	The chapel in the former Leeds General Cemetery is in stone, on a plinth, with a grey slate roof, and is in Greek Revival style. On the northwest front is a portico with four giant Ionic columns, an entablature, and a moulded pediment, containing a doorway with an architrave. Against the northeast side is a marble statue of Michael Sadler, depicting a figure in Greek-style dress standing on a cylindrical plinth with an inscribed tablet.	II
Former lodges, Woodhouse Cemetery; 53.80940°N 1.55650°W		1835	The entrance to the cemetery is flanked by two lodges in gritstone, with grey slate roofs and wrought iron gates, and they are in Greek Revival style. At the entrance are Doric columns with a pediment and a deep blocking course. There is a central entrance and two smaller pedestrian entrances. The lodges have three storeys, pilasters and pediments, and at the rear is a pediment on consoles and urns in niches. In the lodges are sash windows and blind panels.	II
Walsh memorials, St Mark's Church; 53.81196°N 1.55389°W		Early to mid 19th century	The three memorials in the churchyard are to the memory of members of the Walsh family, and are dated between 1825 and 1880. They are in stone, one is a chest tomb, and the others have cast iron railings. All the tombs have carved decorations and inscriptions.	II
Monuments north of east end of Woodhouse Cemetery Chapel; 53.80865°N 1.55647°W	—	1837	A group of four memorials in Woodhouse Cemetery, all in stone, with dates between 1837 and 1894.	II
19 Springfield Mount; 53.80456°N 1.55854°W		1837–39	A pair of houses later used for other purposes, in red brick and stucco, with sill bands, and a hipped slate roof. There are two storeys and high basements, a back to back plan, and fronts of three bays. On the main front the middle bay projects, flanked by decorated pilasters, and steps lead up to a doorway with a moulded surround, a fanlight, and a keystone. At the rear, steps lead up to a doorway with a fanlight, console brackets and a triangular pediment. The windows are sashes with wedge lintels and aprons.	II
7 and 9 Lyddon Terrace; 53.80667°N 1.56002°W		c 1839	A pair of two houses at the end of a terrace, in red brick, with stone dressings, a sill band, and a slate roof. There are two storeys and basements, and each house has two bays. In each house, steps with moulded treads and railings lead up to a doorway in the left bay, with a fanlight and a cornice on consoles. The windows are sashes with brick arches.	II
15, 17 and 19 Lyddon Terrace; 53.80701°N 1.55978°W		1839	A row of three houses in a terrace, in red brick, the basement rendered, with stone dressings, a sill band, and a slate roof. There are two storeys and basements, and each house has two bays. In each house steps with moulded treads and railings lead up to a doorway in the left bay, with pilasters, a fanlight, an entablature, and a cornice. The windows are sashes with wedge lintels.	II
21 Lyddon Terrace and railings 53.80711°N 1.55971°W		1839	A house in a terrace, in red brick with stone dressings, a sill band, and a slate roof. There are three storeys and a basement, and two bays. Steps with moulded treads lead up to a doorway in the left bay that has pilasters, a fanlight, an entablature, and a cornice. The windows are sashes with wedge lintels. The railings enclosing the basement area and the handrails on the steps are in wrought iron.	II
23 and 25 Lyddon Terrace and railings 53.80719°N 1.55967°W		1839	A pair of houses in a terrace in red brick with stone dressings, a sill band, and a slate roof. There are two storeys and a basement, and each house has two bays. Steps with moulded treads lead up to a doorway in each left bay that has pilasters, a fanlight, an entablature, and a cornice. The windows are sashes with wedge lintels. The railings enclosing the basement areas and the handrails on the steps are in wrought iron.	II
Hepworth memorial, St Mark's Church; 53.81182°N 1.55278°W		1839	The memorial in the churchyard is to the memory of members of the Hepworth family. It is in stone and consists of a rectangular podium, with panelled angled pilasters, four-centred arched side panels, a cornice with acanthus leaf decoration and antefixae, and a swept top surmounted by an urn. On the east face is an inscription.	II
32 Headingley Lane; 53.81542°N 1.56276°W		c. 1840	A stone semi-detached house, with a sill band, and a slate roof with coped gables. There are two storeys and a symmetrical front of three bays. The central doorway has pilasters, a fanlight, an entablature, and a cornice, and the windows are sashes.	II
34 Headingley Lane; 53.81548°N 1.56291°W		c. 1840	A stone semi-detached house, with a sill band, and a slate roof with coped gables. There are two storeys and a symmetrical front of three bays. The central doorway has pilasters, a fanlight, an entablature, and a cornice, and the windows are sashes.	II
Gate piers and wall, 34 Headingley Lane; 53.81537°N 1.56304°W	—	c. 1840	The wall running along the front of the garden is in stone with chamfered coping, and extends for about 10 metres (33 ft). The gate piers flanking the pedestrian entrance are square and about 1.2 metres (3 ft 11 in) high. Each pier has a cornice and a shallow pyramidal capstone.	II
36 Headingley Lane; 53.81553°N 1.56313°W	—	c. 1840	A stone house with a sill band, and a stone slate roof with coped gables. There are two storeys, and a symmetrical front of three bays. The central doorway has an architrave, and a cornice and a pediment on console brackets. The ground floor windows have architraves, sill brackets, entablatures, and cornices, and the upper floor windows have plain surrounds.	II
Gate piers and wall, 36 Headingley Lane; 53.81542°N 1.56328°W	—	c. 1840	The wall running along the front of the garden is in stone with moulded capstones, and is about 0.6 metres (2 ft 0 in) high. The gate piers flanking the carriage entrance are square in stone, tapering, and about 2 metres (6 ft 7 in) high. The piers have round-arched recesses on the front, and large pedimented capstones.	II
38 and 40 Headingley Lane; 53.81578°N 1.56343°W		c. 1840	A pair of semi-detached houses with a sill band, and a hipped slate roof. There are two storeys, and each house has three bays. In the centre of each house is a doorway with pilasters, a fanlight and a cornice, and the windows are sash windows.	II
42 and 44 Headingley Lane; 53.81585°N 1.56378°W		c. 1840	A pair of semi-detached houses with a sill band, and a hipped slate roof. There are two storeys, and each house has three bays. In the centre of each house is a doorway with pilasters, a fanlight and a cornice. The windows in No. 42 are top-hung casements, and in No. 44 they are sashes.	II
30 and 32 Hyde Terrace; 53.80388°N 1.55828°W		1840	A pair of houses, later used by the university, they are in red brick with stone dressings, a first floor sill band with scrolled iron brackets, a second floor sill band, a cornice, a blocking course, a shallow pediment, and a slate roof. There are three storeys and basements, and six bays. Steps with railings lead up to doorways in the outer bays that have pilasters, a fanlight, an entablature, and a cornice. A square bay window has been added to the left house, and the other windows are sashes.	II
3, 5 and 7 Victoria Road; 53.81490°N 1.56284°W		c. 1840	A row of three houses in a terrace, they are in stone with a sill band, and a grey slate roof. There are two storeys, basements and attics, and each house has two bays. Steps with nosed threads lead up to the doorways, and each doorway has pilasters, a traceried fanlight, an entablature, and a blocking course. The windows are sashes with architraves. The railings enclosing the basement areas and flanking the steps are in wrought iron.	II
27 and 29 Victoria Road; 53.81484°N 1.56393°W		c. 1840	A pair of mirror-image houses in a terrace, in stone at the front and brick at the sides, with a slate roof. There are two storeys, basements and attics, and each house has three bays. In the centre, steps with wrought iron balustrades lead up to recessed doorways, each with two unfluted Doric columns, and between them is a basement passage. The windows are sashes.	II
Harrison's Houses and railings 53.81216°N 1.55631°W		c. 1840	Originally almshouses, the building is in red brick with stone dressings, a string course, and a slate roof with coped gables. There are two storeys and basements, and a U-shaped plan, with a front of eleven bays, and rear wings. At the entrance is a three-storey embattled tower that has a doorway with a pointed arch, above which is an embattled oriel window, and a three-light mullioned window. The bays flanking the entrance are gabled, and the outer bays project and are also gabled. The windows are mullioned and have top-hung casements, those in the outer bays with hood moulds. In the rear courtyard is a stair tower. Enclosing the areas at the front are low stone walls and wrought iron railings.	II
Fairbairn House; 53.80451°N 1.56138°W		1840–41	A house, later used for other purposes, in red brick with stone dressings, on a stone plinth, with corner pilasters, and a slate roof. It is in Classical style, and has two storeys, a basement and attics, and seven bays. In the centre is a giant Corinthian portico with an entablature and a blind balustraded parapet, the entablature extending over the outer bays. The central doorway has a pediment, and the windows are sashes, those in the middle three bays with architraves, and in the outer bays with flat brick arches.	II
Wall and gate piers, Fairbairn House; 53.80461°N 1.56118°W		1840–41	The wall enclosing the grounds is in brick with stone coping, it extends for about 90 metres (300 ft), and is about 3 metres (9.8 ft) high, reduced to about 1 metre (3 ft 3 in) between the gateways. There are two pairs of square stone gate piers, each with panelled sides and a dentilled pedimented cap.	II
Grave memorial to Ann Carr; 53.80883°N 1.55649°W		1841	One of a group of four memorials in Woodhouse Cemetery, it is in sandstone, and to the memory of Ann Carr, who founded the Female Revivalist Society in 1822. It consists of a plain upright grave slab on a simple plinth, with a shaped top and a long inscription.	II
Monuments east of Woodhouse Cemetery Chapel; 53.80873°N 1.55652°W	—	1841	A group of four memorials in Woodhouse Cemetery, all in stone with dates between 1845 and 1873. One depicts a schoolgirl and a schoolboy, and another has an urn draped with garlands of flowers.	II
6 and 7 Woodhouse Square; 53.80133°N 1.55664°W		1845–55	A pair of houses in a terrace in red brick with stone dressings, on a plinth, with rusticated quoins, a modillion eaves cornice, and a slate roof. There are three storeys and six bays. The doorways in the outer bays each has a moulded architrave, and a dentilled cornice on console brackets. The ground floor windows have architraves, in the middle floor they have architraves, dentilled sills and modillion cornices, and in the top floor dentilled sills.	II
8 and 9 Woodhouse Square; 53.80125°N 1.55686°W		1845–55	A pair of houses in a terrace in red brick with stone dressings, moulded bands, a moulded eaves cornice and blocking course, and a slate roof. There are two storeys and five bays. Each of the two doorways has pilasters, a fanlight, an entablature, and a cornice. The windows are sashes with architraves, those in the ground floor also with recessed panels below.	II
Hopewell House; 53.80607°N 1.55023°W		1847	A house, later an office, it is in red brick, the basement rendered, with stone dressings, a band, paired gutter brackets, and a slate roof. There are two storeys and a basement, and three bays. Steps with railings lead up to a central doorway that has three-quarter Tuscan columns, a fanlight, an entablature, and a cornice. The windows are sashes, those in the ground floor with rendered aprons.	II
Iredale memorial, St Mark's Church; 53.81185°N 1.55345°W		c. 1847	The memorial in the churchyard is to the memory of Joseph Iredale. It is in stone and consists of a rectangular plinth about 1.5 metres (4 ft 11 in) high. On the sides are inscriptions on recessed moulded panels, and on the top is a deep cornice surmounted by a square urn.	II
5 and 7 Lifton Place; 53.80768°N 1.55841°W	—	1847–49	A pair of mirror-image houses, later used by the university, in red brick with stone dressings, on a plinth, with quoins, a sill band, an eaves cornice, and a slate roof. There are two storeys and each house has three bays. The doorways are in the outer bays, each is approached by steps with railings, and has a Classical surround, a fanlight, consoles, and a corniced pediment. The windows are sashes with flat brick arches, and in the right return is a round-arched stair window.	II
9 Lifton Place; 53.80761°N 1.55808°W	—	1847–49	A house, later used by the university, it is in red brick on a plinth, with stone dressings, quoins, a sill band, an eaves cornice, and a hipped slate roof. There are two storeys and five bays. Steps with bull-nose treads lead up to the central doorway that has pilasters, a fanlight, consoles, and a pediment. The windows are sashes with flat brick arches, those in the ground floor with aprons.	II
Grave memorial to Susannah Darby and William Darby; 53.80885°N 1.55651°W		1848	One of a group of four memorials in Woodhouse Cemetery, it is in sandstone, and to the memory of Susannah Darby and her husband William Darby who died in 1871. William Darby was better known as Pablo Fanque, who was a nationally renowned equestrian, and Britain’s first black circus proprietor. The memorial is in two parts, a standing grave slab on a moulded plinth, and a horizontal grave cover shaped like a pitched roof with hipped east end. There are inscriptions on both parts, and on the standing slab is a carving of an ornamented funerary urn in low relief over a cornice of leaves and acorns.	II
37, 39 and 41 Lyddon Terrace and railings 53.80769°N 1.55933°W		1849–51	A row of three houses at the end of a terrace, they are in red brick with stone dressings, sill bands, and a slate roof. There are three storeys and basements, and each house has three bays. Steps with moulded treads lead up to the doorways in the left bay, and each doorway has pilasters, a fanlight, an entablature and a cornice. The windows are sashes, and the railings flanking the steps are in cast iron.	II
14 Clarendon Road; 53.80232°N 1.55677°W		Mid 19th century	A red brick house in a terrace, with decorative bands of tiles and glazed bricks, a decorative eaves cornice, and a slate roof. There are two storeys, a basement and an attic, and four bays. Steps lead up to a doorway with a pointed arch in the left bay, above which are paired windows and a gable. In the second bay are sash windows and an ornamental sunk panel. The third bay contains a full-height segmental bay window, a gable, and a conical roof, and in the right bay are sunk panels.	II
16 Clarendon Road; 53.80241°N 1.55684°W		Mid 19th century	A red brick house at the end of a terrace, with stone dressings, a decorative eaves cornice, and a slate roof. There are two storeys and attics, and a symmetrical front of three bays. Steps lead up to a central doorway with a pointed arch, flanked by canted bay windows with mullions and dentilled cornices. In the upper floor are windows with decorative stone arches, and in the attic are gabled half-dormers containing sashes with pointed arches.	II
Bollard, 5 Kingston Terrace; 53.80964°N 1.55285°W	—	Mid 19th century	The bollard at the entrance to the drive is in cast iron, and about 1 metre (3 ft 3 in) high. It has a bulbous form with roll moulding and a ball finial.	II
1 and 1A Providence Avenue; 53.81565°N 1.55669°W		Mid 19th century	A house, later divided, in stone with a sill band, and a slate roof. There are two storeys and three bays. Steps lead up to a central doorway that has attached columns, a fanlight, and a segmental-arched cornice on brackets, and the windows are sashes.	II
Gates and gate piers, Beech Grove House; 53.80697°N 1.55524°W		Mid 19th century	The gate and inner gate piers are in wrought iron. The gates have trefoil finials, and the piers are in openwork with a square section, and are about 3 metres (9.8 ft) high. The outer piers are in rusticated stone, with a square section, a cornice, and lamp finials.	II
North Lodge on east side of Woodhouse Moor; 53.81096°N 1.55754°W		Mid 19th century	The lodge is in gritstone, and has a blue slate roof with gables and shaped bargeboards. There is a single storey, a basement and an attic, and two bays. On the west front is a porch with octagonal piers; the porch and doorway have four-centred arches. Above them is a quatrefoil window, and to the left is a three-light mullioned window with a hood mould. In the left return is a canted bay window, and the central chimney has four octagonal shafts.	II
27 and 29 Lyddon Terrace and railings 53.80731°N 1.55961°W		c. 1851	A pair of houses in red brick with stone dressings, sill bands, a moulded eaves cornice, and a hipped slate roof. There are three storeys and basements, and each house has three bays. The doorways are in the left bay, and each has pilasters, a fanlight, an entablature, and a pediment. The windows are sashes, and the basement areas are enclosed by cast iron railings.	II
5 Hillary Place; 53.80630°N 1.55219°W		1852	A house, later used by the university, it is in red brick with stone dressings, sill bands, bracketed gutters, and a slate roof. There are three storeys, a front of seven bays, and three bays on the left return. The wide central entrance has paired double doors with a fanlight, rusticated pilasters, a moulded architrave, moulded imposts, a keystone, and a cornice. The windows are sashes, those in the upper two floors with bracketed sills.	II
Statue of Robert Peel, Woodhouse Moor; 53.81408°N 1.56204°W		1852	The statue by William Behnes commemorates the politician Robert Peel, and depicts him in bronze standing and wearing contemporary dress. The figure is on a pedestal in pink granite, on a stepped base of grey granite. On the front of the pedestal is inscribed the date and "PEEL".	II
Clarendon House; 53.80325°N 1.55827°W		1853–57	A house, later used for other purposes, it is in brick with stone dressings, quoins, a deep modillion eaves cornice, and a hipped slate roof. There are two storeys, fronts of three bays, and a single-storey three-bay wing on the right. The entrance bay projects and contains a round-arched doorway with pilasters and a fanlight, above which is a semicircular oriel window, and a gable. The other windows are sashes in architraves. In the right return is an ornate blocked doorway with a round arch and a segmental pediment.	II
Mawer memorial, St Mark's Church; 53.81189°N 1.55389°W		c. 1854	The memorial in the churchyard is to the memory of the sculptor Robert Mawer and his wife Catherine. It is in stone with a shaped podium, and a stepped circular base with console brackets. On this are two winged angels and a square inscribed column with a garland and an urn.	II
Statue of the Duke of Wellington, Woodhouse Moor; 53.80821°N 1.55981°W		1854	The statue by Carlo Marochetti commemorates the Duke of Wellington. It depicts him in bronze, standing on a square pedestal of polished granite, with a cornice and a plinth.	II
Boundary wall, Clarendon House; 53.80324°N 1.55927°W		c. 1855	The wall enclosing the grounds is in red brick with flat stone copings. It varies between 4 metres (13 ft) and 2 metres (6 ft 7 in) in height, and extends for 80 metres (260 ft), with round corners. Opposite the main doorway is an entrance with stone gate piers and a wrought iron overthrow and a lantern bracket. The length along Hyde Place is more ornate, with pilasters and a dentilled frieze. On the corner with Hyde Terrace is a round-arched gateway with a moulded surround.	II
Grave memorial to George Thwaites and family members 53.80883°N 1.55652°W		1841	One of a group of four memorials in Woodhouse Cemetery, it is in sandstone, and to the memory of George Thwaites, a local innkeeper, and members of his family. It consists of the sculpture in high relief of a draped mourning female figure leaning against a broken pillar, set in a round-arched decorated frame, standing on a large plinth on which there are inscriptions.	II
1–8 Woodsley Terrace; 53.80579°N 1.56005°W		1856	A terrace of eight red brick houses with stone dressings, a floor band, and a slate roof. There are three storeys, each house has three bays, and the outer houses project under gables. The doorways have pilasters, console brackets, a dentilled cornice, and blocking course. The windows are sashes, those in the ground floor with architraves.	II
Gate piers and wall, Woodsley Terrace; 53.80577°N 1.56054°W		1856	The boundary wall is in brick with stone coping, it is about 1.5 metres (4 ft 11 in) high, and about 30 metres (98 ft) long. The gate piers are in stone and about 2.5 metres (8 ft 2 in) high. Each pier is square, on a panelled plinth, on the shaft are moulded and fielded panels, and there is a deep modillion cornice.	II
38 Hyde Terrace; 53.80420°N 1.55913°W		1857	A vicarage, later converted into flats, it is in red brick, with stone dressings and a slate roof. There are two storeys and attics, and three bays, the left bay projecting and gabled. In the centre is an embattled porch and a recessed round-arched doorway with columns and a hood mould. To the left are three round-arched windows with attached columns under linked hood moulds in both floors, and there are two similar windows over the doorway. In the right bay are traceried two-light round-arched windows under a stepped gable.	II
Gate piers and wall, 38 Hyde Terrace; 53.80406°N 1.55933°W		1857	Running along the front garden is a high ramped red brick wall with stone moulded coping and it extends for about 20 metres (66 ft). The piers are in stone, square, and about 2 metres (6 ft 7 in) high. They are carved with attached columns, and have shallow pyramidal caps with moulding and a carved pattern.	II
40 Hyde Terrace; 53.80428°N 1.55943°W		1857	A vicarage, later used for other purposes, it is in red brick with stone dressings, quoins, and a blue slate roof. There are three storeys, and fronts of three and two bays. The entrance in the recessed left bay has a doorway with a moulded archway and a hood mould. There is a four-storey corner turret containing an oriel window, arrow slits, and a pyramidal roof with a louvred ventilator. The middle bay projects and is gabled, and contains windows with trefoils and pointed arches, and in the right bay is a five-light canted bay window and a gabled dormer.	II
Highfield Villa; 53.80413°N 1.55889°W		1857	A house, later divided, in red brick with stone dressings, a deep modillion cornice, and a slate roof. There are two storeys and a basement, and four bays, the left bay projecting as a wing, it has gables with bargeboards. The doorway in the second bay has a carved stone surround, a cornice, and console brackets. In the left bay is a canted bay window and a two-light window above. The windows are sashes with architraves and segmental heads.	II
Blenheim Baptist Church; 53.80608°N 1.54923°W		c. 1858	The church, later used for other purposes, is in gritstone with a slate roof, and is in Gothic Revival style. It consists of a nave with north and south aisles, all under one roof, north and south transepts, a polygonal apse at the east end, and a northwest steeple. At the west end is a gabled portal, above it is a five-light traceried window, and the windows elsewhere in the church are lancets. The steeple has a tower with corner buttresses, gables over the belfry, and a square spire with lucarnes and a lead-clad finial.	II
Former Leeds Grammar School; 53.80803°N 1.56065°W		1858–59	The school was designed by E. M. Barry and extended to the west in 1904–05 by Austin and Paley. It is in gritstone with slate roofs. The original part is in Gothic Revival style. There are two storeys and a cruciform plan, with six gabled bays and a gabled cross-wing. At the corners are octagonal buttresses with pinnacles, and over the crossing is a spirelet.	II
Walls, railings and gates, former Leeds Grammar School; 53.80811°N 1.56042°W		1858–59	The walls enclosing the north and east sides of the grounds are in gritstone with chamfered copings, and extend for about 120 metres (390 ft). The railings and gates are in cast iron, the railings with cusped openwork panels. There are two pairs of gate piers, each with a plinth, a chamfered shaft, and a stepped pyramidal capstone.	II
Hanover House; 53.80335°N 1.55895°W		1859	A pair of semi-detached houses, later offices, in red brick with stone dressings, a band, a modillion eaves cornice, and a hipped slate roof. There are two storeys and six bays. In the centre is a portico with three columns that have decorative capitals, a modillion cornice, and a blocking course, and the doors have fanlights. The windows are sashes with segmental heads, those in the ground floor with keystones, the middle pair in the upper floor also with architraves and keystones.	II
Driver Memorial, St Mark's Church; 53.81215°N 1.55378°W		c. 1859	The memorial in the churchyard is to the memory of Richard Driver. It is in stone and has a square low curb, a stepped plinth, an entablature, and a cornice with egg and dart moulding. On this is a canopy on four marble shafts, with a square finial. On the east side of the plinth is an inscription.	II
Sycamore Lodge; 53.81578°N 1.55885°W		c. 1860	A house, later an office, in red brick, partly rendered, with stone dressings, quoins, a sill band, and a slate roof. There are two storeys and three bays. The middle bay has a three-storey tower containing a round-arched doorway with rusticated voussoirs and a keystone carved with a female head. Above, is a carved plaque, and windows with round-arched heads. The top storey contains a bracketed balcony with a cast iron rail, over which are bracketed eaves, a pyramidal roof, and an ornate cast iron finial. The outer bays have a canted bay window in the ground floor, and the windows in the upper floor are sashes, each with a segmental-arched head, an architrave, and a cornice on console brackets. The left bay is gabled with deep bracketed eaves.	II
Wall and gate piers, Sycamore Lodge; 53.81552°N 1.55978°W		c. 1860	The wall enclosing the west and south sides of the garden is in gritstone with chamfered coping, it extends for about 90 metres (300 ft), and is about 1.5 metres (4 ft 11 in) high. The gateway has chamfered square piers, each on a plinth, and with a moulded capstone and an ogee dome. The piers have flower motifs and are inscribed with the name of the house.	II
6 and 7 Hillary Place; 53.80634°N 1.55235°W		1861	A pair of mirror-image houses, later used by the university, in red brick with stone dressings, a band, and a slate roof. There are three storeys and six bays. In the centre, the right of the paired doorways has been converted into a window, and each part has rusticated pilasters, an entablature with a carved panel, and a moulded dentilled cornice with a scrolled panel above. The windows are sashes with bracketed sills; in the ground floor and middle floors they have keystones and in the ground floor they have architraves.	II
34 Hyde Terrace; 53.80391°N 1.55850°W		1861	A house, later used by the university, in red brick with stone dressings, on a stone plinth, with bands, a modillion eaves cornice, a pediment over the middle bay, and a hipped slate roof. There are two storeys and a basement, and a symmetrical front of five bays. The central doorway has pilasters with foliate capitals, a semicircular fanlight, an entablature, and a dentilled cornice. The windows are sashes with architraves.	II
Crowther Memorial, St Mark's Church; 53.81223°N 1.55337°W		c. 1861	The memorial in the churchyard is to the memory of George Johnston Crowther. It is in stone, and has a square base, a square plinth with an inscription, and a tall Ionic column surmounted by a square gadrooned urn finial.	II
Alexander Memorial, St Mark's Church; 53.81174°N 1.55341°W		c. 1862	The memorial in the churchyard is to the memory of William Alexander. It is in stone with a chamfered base, a plinth with recessed panels, and a square column with a moulded base and a sculpted portrait head. On the top is a deep oversailing cornice that previously carried sculpted figures.	II
Broadcasting House; 53.80564°N 1.54853°W		1866–68	Originally a Quaker Meeting House, later converted for other uses, it is in stone with a slate roof and is in Classical style. There are two storeys, a front of five bays, and six bays on the sides. The ground floor on the front projects, and contains an arcade of three arches with Tuscan columns, and an entablature, above which is a balustraded parapet. In the upper floor are sash windows with moulded architraves, and cornice hoods on console brackets. Above the front is a modillion cornice, and a pediment with a round window in the tympanum.	II
25 Blenheim Terrace; 53.80764°N 1.55155°W	—	1867	A house in a terrace, later used for other purposes, in red brick, with stone dressings, bracketed eaves, and a slate roof with coped gables and carved kneelers. There are three storeys and three bays. Steps lead up to a recessed doorway in the left bay, with a moulded round-arched architrave, and a moulded plaque below the fanlight. The windows are sashes, in the ground floor they have a shouldered arch in an architrave and carved keystones, and the upper floor windows have segmental heads and keystones.	II
26 Blenheim Terrace; 53.80767°N 1.55168°W	—	1867	A house in a terrace, later used for other purposes, in red brick, with bracketed eaves and a slate roof. There are two storeys, a basement and attic, and two bays. The left bay projects, and rises to a square turret with a truncated pyramidal roof. This bay contains a doorway approached by steps with railings, and has a decorative surround, a fanlight, and a carved hood mould. The right bay is wider, with a coped Dutch gable and a vase finial. The windows are sashes, paired in the right bay and divided by columns with foliate capitals. In the attic is a window with a Gothic arch, an impost band, and a hood mould.	II
Southfield House; 53.80392°N 1.56062°W		1867–70	A house in red brick with stone dressings and a slate roof. There are three bays, the left bay with two storeys, and the others with three. The narrow central bay contains a round-arched doorway with a moulded architrave and a keystone, above which are round-arched windows, and a turret with pyramidal roof and a finial. The other windows have segmental-arched heads, and all are sashes with moulded architraves and keystones. The left bay has paired windows, and a scrolled gable containing a roundel. In the right bay is a canted bay window, above which is a paired window, a single-light window, and a scrolled gable.	II
Burley House; 53.80215°N 1.55658°W		1868	A house, later offices, designed by George Corson, in red brick with stone dressings, and a slate roof. There are two storeys, a basement and attics, a front of two bays, and three bays on the right return. In the left bay on the front, steps lead up to a doorway with a segmental head in a projecting gabled bay window. The right bay has a full-height semicircular bay window, the basement having an open arcade with octagonal columns and shouldered arches, above are sash windows with curved glass, two-light in the ground floor with stone mullions and lintels, single lights in the upper floor, over which is a moulded eaves cornice and a conical roof. In the right return are round-arched and segmental-arched windows, in the attic are four-pane sash windows under a hipped roof, and these are flanked by decorative turrets with slit vents and spires with ornate finials.	II
Leeds Grammar School Chapel; 53.80784°N 1.55993°W		1868	The chapel was designed by E. M. Barry in Gothic Revival style. It is in gritstone and has a slate roof with coped gables and cross finials. There is a quatrefoil pierced parapet, and at the corners are buttresses rising to open turrets. The windows have Decorated tracery, with two lights along the sides and five at the east end. The doorway has attached granite columns, and a hood mould, and above it is a rose window.	II
Statue of Sir Peter Fairbairn, Woodhouse Square; 53.80171°N 1.55652°W		1868	The statue by Matthew Noble commemorates the inventor and engineer Peter Fairbairn. It depicts him in bronze, standing with a scroll in his right hand, his left hand resting on a plinth with a cog wheel, and drapery with a chain of office. This is on a tall square pedestal with a cornice and a plinth, and on the pedestal is an inscription.	II
Clothworkers' Centenary Concert Hall; 53.80586°N 1.55359°W		1870	Originally a Presbyterian church, it was converted into a concert hall for the university in 1974–75. It is in red brick with stone dressings, continuous impost string courses, quoin pilasters, an entablature, a cornice, corner turrets, and a slate roof. There are two storeys and a front of five bays, the middle bay projecting and rising as a tower. Steps lead up to the central entrance that has Ionic columns, and a balustered parapet. In each of the middle three bays is a doorway with a semicircular fanlight. The windows have round-arched heads, and the tower has three stages, a cornice, a carved blocking course, pyramid finials, and a two-stage cupola with a gilded dome and a finial.	II
Pack Horse Public House; 53.81045°N 1.55571°W		1870	The public house, on a corner site, is in red brick with stone dressings, moulded eaves brackets, and a slate roof, hipped on the left. There are two storeys and cellars, three bays on the front, two bays in the left return, and a curved bay on the corner. The doorway and the windows, which are sashes, have carved attached columns and capitals with foliage and vine motifs, and shouldered arches. The doorway also has a fanlight and a keystone carved with grapes, a bottle and a pack horse.	II
St Augustine's Church, Wrangthorn; 53.81462°N 1.56259°W		1870–71	The church is in gritstone with a slate roof, and is in Decorated style. It consists of a nave with a clerestory, north and south aisles, a south porch, north and south chapels, a chancel, and a southeast steeple. The steeple is 57 metres (187 ft) high, and has a tower with three stages, shallow corner buttresses, corbels carved as angels and grotesques, an octagonal bell stage, large open pinnacles, and a tall spire.	II
8 and 9 Hillary Place; 53.80635°N 1.55271°W		1872	A house at the end of a terrace, later used by the university, it is in red brick on a plinth, with stone dressings, quoins, a bracketed and dentilled eaves cornice, a slate roof, and three storeys. All the windows are casements with architraves. The front on Hillary Place has four bays, the left bay recessed and containing a round-arched doorway with a fanlight, and a bracketed cornice. The windows in the ground and top floors have segmental heads and keystones. In the middle floor they have flat heads, in the left bay with a segmental pediment, and cornices in the other bays. The front facing Cavendish Road has three bays, a central doorway with a semicircular bay window to the left, and a three-light pedimented window to the right.	II
24 Blenheim Terrace; 53.80760°N 1.55144°W		Late 19th century	A house in a terrace, later used for other purposes, in red brick with stone dressings, sill bands, moulded eaves, and a slate roof. There are three storeys and a basement, and three bays. Steps lead up to a doorway with a fanlight in the left bay. The windows are casements with decorative heads in stone and coloured brick. The windows in the top floor have small cast iron balconies on bracketed sills.	II
1A Cavendish Road; 53.80682°N 1.55249°W		Late 19th century	A church building, later used by the university, it is in gritstone with a slate roof, and in Gothic Revival style. On the front are two storeys and three bays, with ten bays along the side with gabled wings, and four storeys at the rear. On the gabled front is a porch with a chamfered arch and attached columns, above is a three-light window and niches, and a rose window.	II
Cross southwest of All Souls' House; 53.80763°N 1.54640°W		Late 19th century	The cross is in the form of a medieval preaching cross, and is 5.5 metres (18 ft) high. It has an octagonal base of three moulded steps, a square plinth with a moulded base and traceried panels, a tapered shaft with moulded corners, a carved cornice, a stage with ogee panels, and a floriate cross.	II
All Souls' Church, wall and war memorial 53.80800°N 1.54684°W		1876–80	The church was designed by George Gilbert Scott in Early English style, and completed by his son, John Oldrid Scott. It is in gritstone with a slate roof, and consists of a nave and chancel with a clerestory, north and south aisles, a south porch, and a northwest tower. The tower has four stages, an octagonal stair turret, a pierced parapet, and a short pyramidal spire. In the porch is a doorway with a pointed arch, and above is a niche. The windows are lancets, triple in the clerestory, with buttresses between them. The wall enclosing the churchyard is in stone with stepped pointed coping. Against the south wall of the church is a war memorial consisting of a wooden cross with a bronze figure under a pitched roof. It stands on a plinth with corner columns on a square stone base, and on the plinth is a bronze plaque.	II*
Emmanuel Church; 53.80702°N 1.55230°W		1876–80	The steeple was added to the church in about 1920, which later became the university chaplaincy. The church is built in stone with slate roofs, and has a cruciform plan, consisting of a nave with a clerestory, a gabled porch, north and south transepts, a chancel, and a steeple at the crossing. The steeple has a tower with two-light belfry windows, corner turrets with pinnacles, and a spire.	II
Great Hall, Clothworkers' Court, and Baines Wing, University of Leeds; 53.80766°N 1.55460°W		1877–1912	A series of buildings designed by Alfred Waterhouse and Paul Waterhouse, built in bands of red brick and stone and with slate roofs. At the entrance is a gabled porch, and at the gable end of the Great Hall is a large Perpendicular traceried window flanked by towers with tall pyramidal roofs, and bartizans at the corners. The Baines Wing has three storeys and seven bays, a central tower with corner turrets, mullioned and transomed windows, gabled dormers, and tall ventilators.	II
Statue of H. R. Marsden, Woodhouse Moor; 53.81157°N 1.55677°W		1878	The statue commemorates Henry Rowland Marsden, inventor and politician, and depicts him in Carrera marble, standing and dressed in mayoral robes. The figure is on a marble pedestal with a cornice and stepped plinth. On the pedestal are carved plaques and an inscription.	II
Whiteley memorial, St Mark's Church; 53.81218°N 1.55376°W		c. 1879	The memorial in the churchyard is to the memory of Thomas Whiteley and his wife. It is in stone, and has a stepped base and a square plinth. This is surmounted by an octagonal pillar with a niche finial enclosed in a square traceried framework, with quatrefoil columns and Gothic arches.	II
Quarry Mount School; 53.81538°N 1.55446°W		1885	The school is in red brick with stone dressings, brick decoration, moulded string courses, and a slate roof, and is in Gothic Revival style. The school is in two and three storeys, with a front of nine bays, three bays projecting and gabled. In the fourth bay is a narrow four-stage clock tower with a gabled pyramidal roof. There are five entrances with carved lintels, and the windows are mullioned, or mullioned and transomed.	II
All Souls' House; 53.80780°N 1.54629°W	—	1885–86	The vicarage to All Souls' Church, later converted into flats, is in gritstone, and has a stone slate roof with coped gables. There are two storeys, and attic and a basement, and seven bays. In the right bay is a doorway with a moulded pointed arch and a hood mould, above which is a crocketed niche. The windows have single lights or are mullioned, and above the ground floor windows is an inscribed frieze. At the rear is a full-height canted bay window, mullioned and transomed windows, and two dormers with carved bargeboards.	II
Tennant Hall; 53.80762°N 1.54609°W		1885–86	The Sunday school and hall to All Souls' Church, later used for other purposes, is in stone and has a stone slate roof with coped gables. The school has two storeys and an L-shaped plan with a front of six bays. There are two entrances with pointed arches, the left entrance also has a crocketed finial. The windows have one light with a transom, or two or three lights with mullions and transoms. At the rear are three bays, the middle bay projecting and gabled. The hall has a single storey, a doorway with a pointed arch and a moulded surround, and mullioned and transomed windows with hood moulds.	II
Bethel First United Church of Jesus Christ; 53.81477°N 1.56476°W		1886	The church is in sandstone with gritstone dressings and a slate roof. The front is narrow, and the church is splayed to the rear over a basement. The right return is in brick with a timber framed clerestory, and at the rear is a transept crossing wing. On the front, steps lead up to a two-bay gabled portal. Above this is a large five-light window and a gable, and it is flanked by buttresses with pinnacles. The portal is flanked by narrow bays with buttresses, and to the left is a square tower with a louvred bell stage, corner pinnacles, and a three-stage timber slated spire.	II
Leeds Fire Brigade Memorial, Woodhouse Cemetery; 53.80926°N 1.55665°W		1892	The memorial is to the memory of Leeds firemen. It is in granite, and consists of a square stepped plinth and an obelisk. On the plinth are inscriptions including the names of men lost, at the base of the obelisk are carved limestone plaques depicting fire service equipment, and on the top is a helmet.	II
Wall, gate piers and gates, Trinity Congregational Church; 53.80643°N 1.55067°W		1898	The wall enclosing the grounds of the church is in stone, it extends for about 150 metres (490 ft) and is stepped up the hill, it has chamfered coping, and contains stone piers. At the southeast corner is a gateway with chamfered piers that have octagonal moulded embattled caps, and the double gates are in wrought iron.	II
Trinity Congregational Church, Sunday School and Lodge; 53.80659°N 1.55101°W		1899–1901	The church, Sunday school and lodge are in stone with slate roofs. The church consists of a nave, north and south aisles, north and south transepts, a chancel and vestry, and a north porch and steeple. The steeple has a two-stage tower with crocketed pinnacles, an embattled and panelled parapet, and a crocketed spire. At the liturgical west end is a gabled porch, a seven-light traceried window, and octagonal corner turrets with pinnacles. The Sunday school has a five-light window and corner turrets. The lodge is to the south, and plainer.	II
Former public library, gate piers and railings 53.81081°N 1.55682°W		1901	The police and fire station and public library are on a corner site, and were converted into a public house in about 1994. The building is in red brick with stone dressings, a modillion eaves cornice, a balustraded parapet with urns, and a roof of Westmorland green slate. The main block has two storeys, a front of five bays, four bays on the left return, and a single-storey three-bay library entrance to the right. In the middle bay is an arched entrance with a carved keystone and spandrels. The bay is flanked by columns of polished granite in both floors, Ionic in the ground floor and Corinthian above, carrying a segmental pediment. On the corner is a two-stage tower, the lower stage square with Ionic pilasters, the upper stage octagonal with clock faces, and a lead-clad dome. The library entrance has a projecting semicircular porch on Tuscan columns and a carved plaque. In the left return is a semicircular bay window and a smaller canted bay window. To the left are gates and a pair of octagonal gate piers, about 3 metres (9.8 ft) high with moulded capstones.	II
Memorial to Queen Victoria; Woodhouse Moor; 53.81081°N 1.55682°W		1903	The statue of Queen Victoria is by George Frampton and was moved to its present site in 1937. The base of four steps and the pedestal are in Portland stone. On the plinth is a continuous bronze frieze with lettering and motifs, the royal arms in deep relief, and niches with seated statues of personifications. It is surmounted by the bronze statue of Queen Victoria, seated on a throne and dressed in coronation robes. On the back of the throne is a carved radiant sun.	II*
Hyde Park Post Office; 53.81472°N 1.56056°W		1906	The former post and delivery office is on a corner site, and is in orange-red brick with stone details, on a plinth, with quoins, and in Baroque style. The post office is on the corner and has two storeys, three bays on each front and an angled corner bay. The doorway on the corner has pilasters and an open pediment, and above it is a window with a segmental head, and a parapet with carved scrolls and swags. In the ground floor are three large recessed arched three-light windows with keystones, and the other windows are sashes. The delivery office extends to the rear, it has a single storey, and contains windows with segmental heads.	II
Adult Education Centre; 53.80484°N 1.55906°W		1907–10	Built as a residence for students of the Community of the Resurrection and designed by Temple Moore, it was extended in 1927–28, and later used by the university. It is in red-brown brick with stone dressings, on a stone plinth, and with a tile roof. The building is in Tudor style with a U-shaped plan. In the centre is an entrance block in the form of a tower with flanking octagonal turrets, embattled parapets, and a bellcote. It contains a Tudor arched doorway with shields in the spandrels, above which is a moulded string course and a three-light traceried staircase window. To the right is a chapel range of two storeys and five bays with buttresses between the bays. To the left is a longer range with two storeys, basements and attics, and at the rear are two wings with bay windows and carriage entrances.	II*
Gate piers and wall, Adult Education Centre; 53.80500°N 1.55892°W	—	c. 1908	Running along the boundary is a low brick wall with stone coping, extending for about 60 metres (200 ft). Opposite the main entrance are stone piers, each with a moulded projecting band and a ball finial.	II
12A Clarendon Road; 53.80225°N 1.55665°W		Early 20th century	A red brick house in a terrace with stone dressings and a slate roof. There are two storeys, a basement and an attic, and two bays. In the left bay is a two-storey canted bay window with a gable above. In the right bay, steps lead up to a doorway with a segmental hood, and the windows have small panes.	II
Former Agricultural Sciences building and railings 53.80787°N 1.55756°W		1912	The building, designed by Paul Waterhouse, has a steel frame, and is in red brick with stone dressings and a slate roof. There are two storeys, basements and attics, and five bays, the outer bays projecting. In the centre, steps with low walls lead up to a doorway with a Tuscan surround, an entablature, and a cornice. Corner pilasters rise to a broken pediment, above which is a pavilion roof with a circular dormer. The outer bays have pavilion roofs, a cornice, and flat-roofed dormers. The windows are tall with small panes, pivoted opening lights, and raised panels between the floors. Enclosing the basement area is a wall and cast iron railings with an X-motif, containing a pair of square stone gate piers with cornices and pyramidal caps.	II
Grave memorial to Albert Horner and family members 53.80885°N 1.55648°W		1921	One of a group of four memorials in Woodhouse Cemetery, it is in sandstone, and to the memory of Albert Horner, a stonemason, and members of his family. It consists of a plinth carved in relief with leaves, on a T-shaped base, on which is a scroll and a relief carving of a stonemason’s hammer and trowel. There are inscriptions on the scroll and on the base.	II
Burley Branch Library and railings 53.80786°N 1.57504°W		1926	The library, now closed, is in red brick with dressings in sandstone and Portland stone, a band, an eaves cornice, and a parapet. There is a single storey and a basement, and a symmetrical front of nine bays. The middle bay projects and contains a doorway with an entablature, carved consoles, and Greek key decoration. Above the doorway is an inscribed stone, and a shallow pediment in Art Deco style. The adjacent bays contain small casement windows, and the windows in the outer bays have carved surrounds and flat hoods on carved consoles. The basement area is enclosed by cast iron railings on a sandstone plinth.	II
Parkinson Building, other university buildings, and wall 53.80798°N 1.55264°W		1932	A group of university buildings, the Chemistry and Engineering Building opened in 1932, the Brotherton Library in 1936, and the Parkinson Building in 1950. The principal façades are in Portland stone, and the rest are in brick with stone dressings. At the front is the Parkinson Building with three main storeys, a basement, a recessed two-storey attic, and a clock tower, behind it is the three-storey circular library with a dome, and to the north the Chemistry and Engineering building with three storeys. At the front are 23 bays, the middle five bays projecting with a wide flight of steps and four giant Ionic columns. The clock tower has four stepped stages and a pyramidal cap. In front of the buildings is a low stepped stone wall with flat coping and circular piers.	II
School of Mineral Engineering; 53.80915°N 1.55389°W		Early 1930s	A university building in Portland stone on the front and brick at the rear, on a plinth, with a first-floor cornice decorated with animal heads, a plainer second-floor cornice, and a parapet. There are two storeys and an attic, and a front of 13 bays. The middle seven bays project and have giant pilasters with acanthus capitals between which are windows with geometrical tracery and decorative panels. In the flanking bays are doorways, each with a moulded architrave, above which is a window with a keystone, and a corbelled balcony with a decorative iron balustrade. The other windows are metal-framed with margin glazing bars, and above the middle attic window is a winged head.	II
Hubert Dalwood Mural Relief; 53.80645°N 1.55535°W		1961–62	The mural relief was originally on the wall of Bodington Hall, and is by Hubert Dalwood. It consists of a rectangular panel 6.4 metres (21 ft) high and 6.1 metres (20 ft) wide. The relief is made from 36 small panels, and forms an abstract composition. It was moved to the stage@leeds building on the University of Leeds campus in 2016.	II
A Celebration of Engineering Sciences; 53.80986°N 1.55535°W		1963	A relief mural on the front of a projecting lecture theatre of the Mechanical Engineering Department building, University of Leeds. It has a curved concrete frame in which are eleven pierced panels in glass fibre reinforced polyester creating sculptural abstract forms.	II
Henry Price Residence; 53.80886°N 1.55834°W		1964	A university hall of residence, it is on brick supported by concrete pillars, built on a pre-existing stone wall, with concrete infill below the windows, and a concrete-slated timber roof. There are six storeys and 27 bays. At the north end is a stair tower with concrete and glass bands, surmounted by a pyramidal water tank. At ground level is a covered walkway and four entrances, and the windows above have aluminium frames.	II
University Campus buildings 53.80545°N 1.55400°W		1964–76	A group of university buildings designed by Chamberlin, Powell and Bon. They are in reinforced concrete, mostly painted or rendered. Most of the buildings are in narrow spines linked by covered walkways.	II
Roger Stevens Building; 53.80498°N 1.55452°W		1970	A university building designed by Chamberlin, Powell and Bon, it is in rendered concrete, and carried on piers. The block is in four stepped sections, the sections divided by external semicircular ventilation shafts, and there are two semicircular external staircases. Internally there are four ranks of four lecture theatres. The block is connected to other parts by ramps and walkways.	II*
