= All Souls' Church, Blackman Lane =

Coordinates: 53.80796°N 1.54671°W

All Souls Church
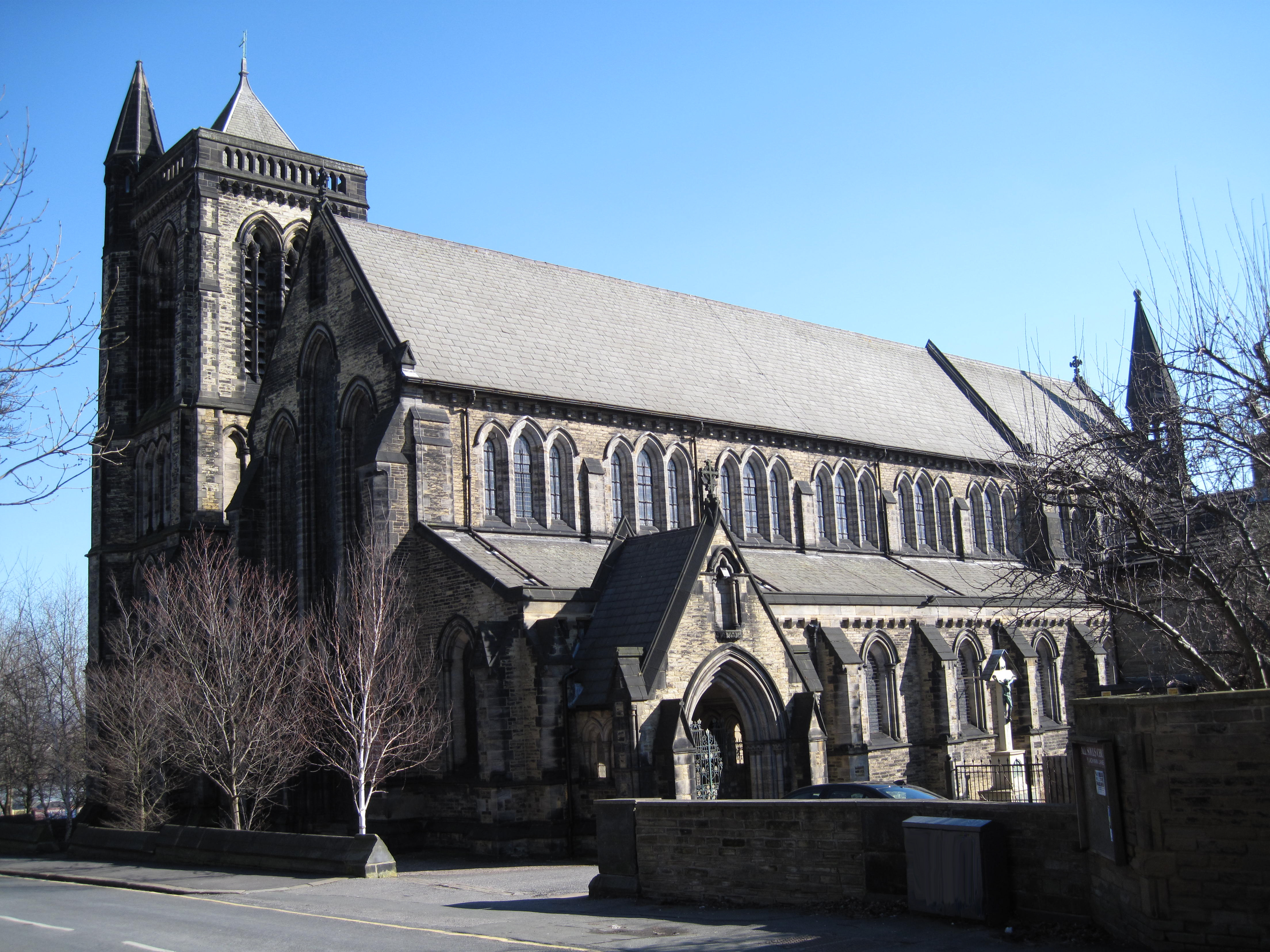
- All Souls Church
- OS grid reference: SE 29943 34722
- Location: Leeds, West Yorkshire
- Country: England
- Denomination: Church of England
- Churchmanship: Liberal Catholic
- Website: Parish website

History
- Dedication: All Souls

Architecture
- Architect: Sir George Gilbert Scott

Administration
- Province: York
- Diocese: Leeds
- Archdeaconry: Leeds
- Deanery: Allerton
- Parish: Leeds All Souls

Clergy
- Vicar: Rev Sonia Kasibante

All Souls' Church, Blackman Lane, in Leeds, West Yorkshire, England is a large Victorian Church of England parish church. Worship at All Souls is in the Anglo-Catholic tradition of the Church of England. The church is a Grade II* listed building.

== History ==
All Souls' Church was built by public subscription in one of the poorest districts of Leeds, the Leylands, as a memorial to Dr W. F. Hook, Vicar of Leeds for some 22 years and later Dean of Chichester. A new parish was formed from parts of the parishes of St Matthew, St Mark, and St Michael (Buslingthorpe) extending up to Woodhouse Lane, where it was intended the church should be sited. However, this could not be managed and it was placed on Blackman Lane, which was, however, convenient for the parish inhabitants.

It was designed by Sir George Gilbert Scott, and is the last church he designed before his death in 1878: his son, John Oldrid Scott, took over the supervision of the building. The foundation stone was laid in September 1876; the church was consecrated on 29 January 1880.

The design is simple and impressive in scale: 134 ft in length with aisles both to the nave and chancel, a southwest porch and a baptistery under the northwest tower. Southowram stone with Meanwood dressings was used for the exterior, Harehills stone for the interior. The column supports for the nave arcades are of Park Spring stone. The interior walls are of ashlar stonework.

Between 1968 and 1974 Tennant Hall, formerly the church's Sunday Schools, was used as the BBC Leeds TV studios, primarily for the nightly local news programme Look North. In 1974 the BBC moved to new, purpose-built studios nearby at Broadcasting House, Woodhouse Lane.

The ornate wooden font cover was donated by the artist Emily Ford in thanksgiving for her own baptism as an adult. She decorated the cover with biblical scenes in which the characters have the faces of her friends and fellow campaigners. The West Yorkshire branch of the Victorian Society raised £6,000 in 2013 to enable Ford's eight painted panels to be cleaned and restored by David Everingham.

The great rood cross carved in lime wood hanging above the choir shows “Christ Triumphant on the Cross" by John Francis Kavanagh and was a memorial to Cecil, Walter Hook's son, the first priest of All Souls'.

== Organ ==
The organ was built in 1877 by Abbott and Smith, and restored in 1906 and 1938 by the same builder. It was restored by Wood Wordsworth and Co in 1976, and by John T Jackson in 1997. A specification of the organ can be found on the National Pipe Organ Register.

The ornate organ case was designed by A. Crawford Hick.

=== Organists ===
- Frederick William Hird (1826–1887)
- John Pew Bowling (1851–1886): resigned as organist a short time before his death on 10 July 1886.
- Hugh Mulleneux Lawrence: organist 1887–1896
- Thomas James Hoggett: 1896–1901
- Newell Smith Wallbank: ????–1911
- Charles Legh Naylor: 1911–1917
- Dr Richard Henry Hargrave (1875-1952)????–????
- Keith Senior: 2008–present

== Services ==
Sunday services offer Anglo-Catholic liturgy, with full lay involvement and children's talk.

Sunday

- 11.00 Sung Mass

Wednesday

- 10.30 Mass

== See also ==
- List of new churches by George Gilbert Scott in Northern England
- Grade II* listed buildings in Leeds
- Listed buildings in Leeds (Hyde Park and Woodhouse)

== Gallery ==
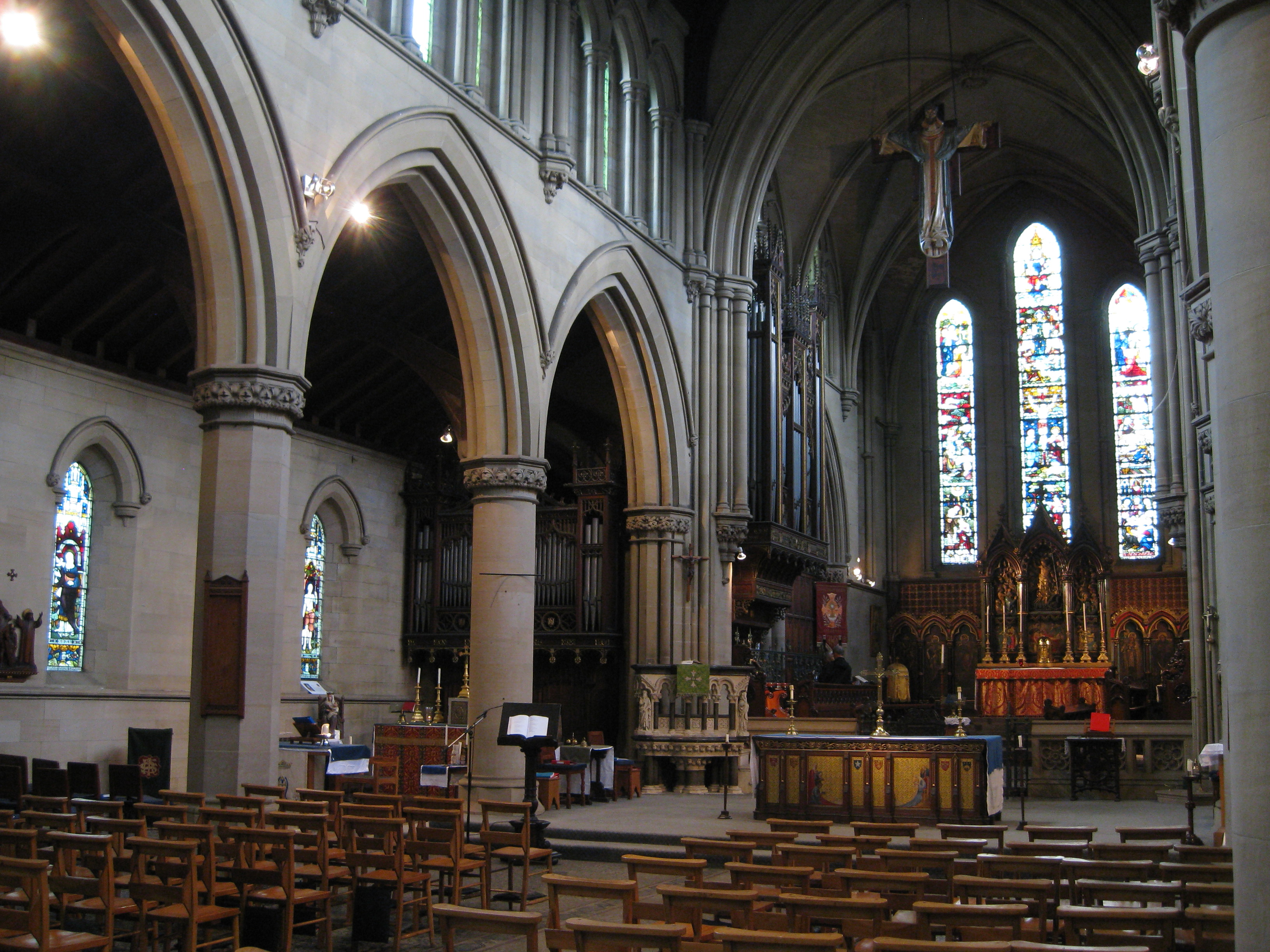
Interior

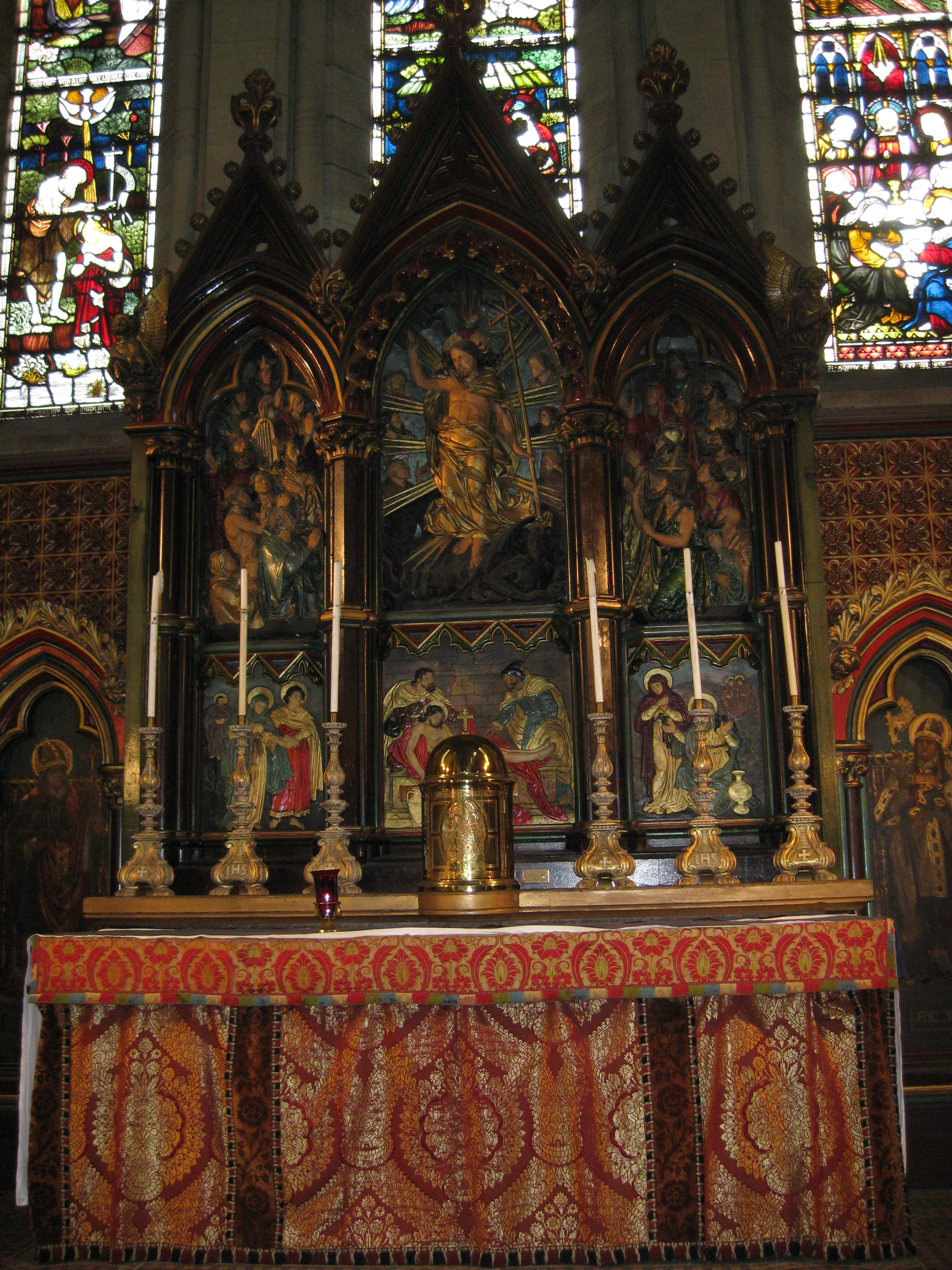
High Altar and Reredos

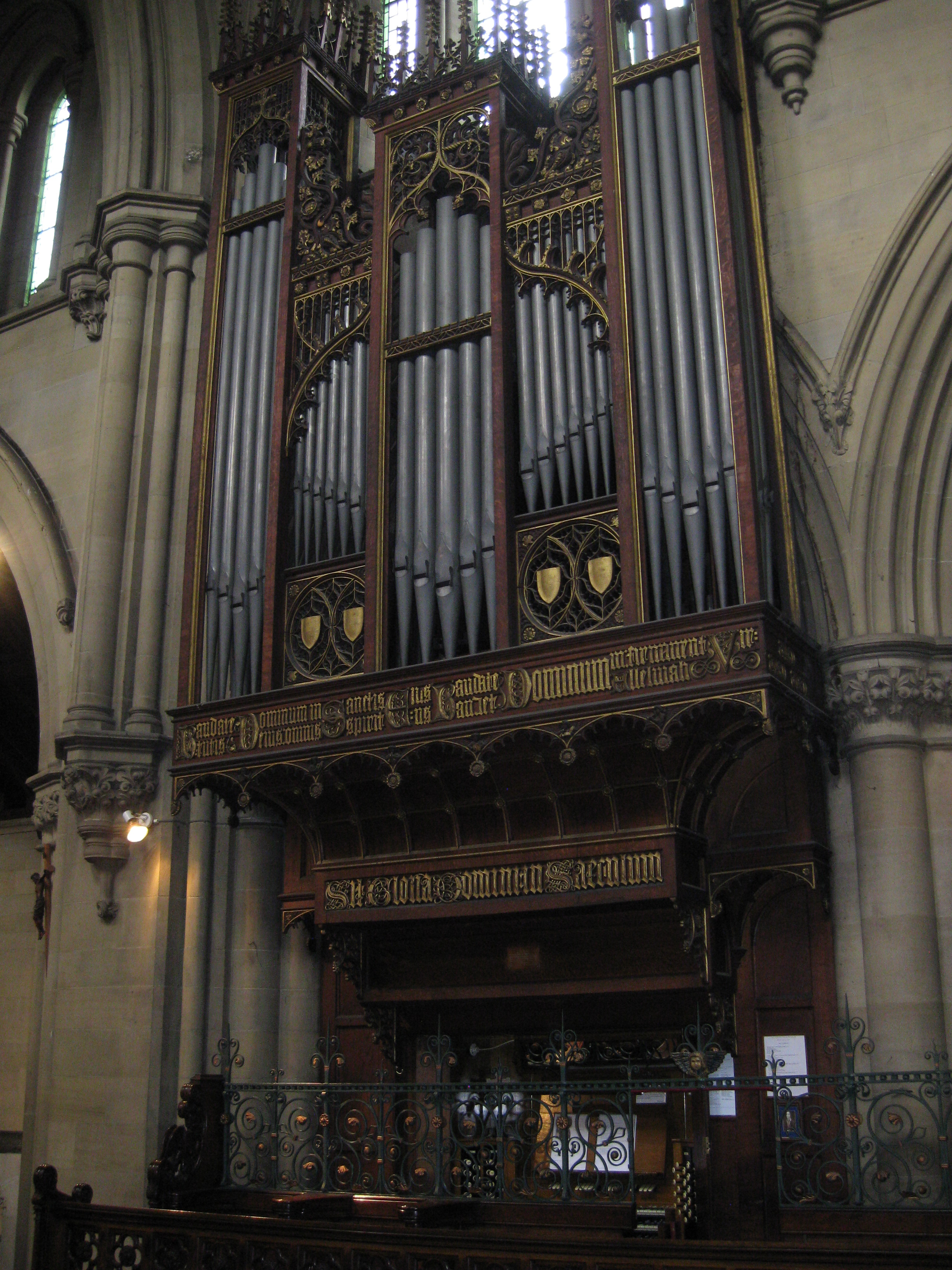
Organ

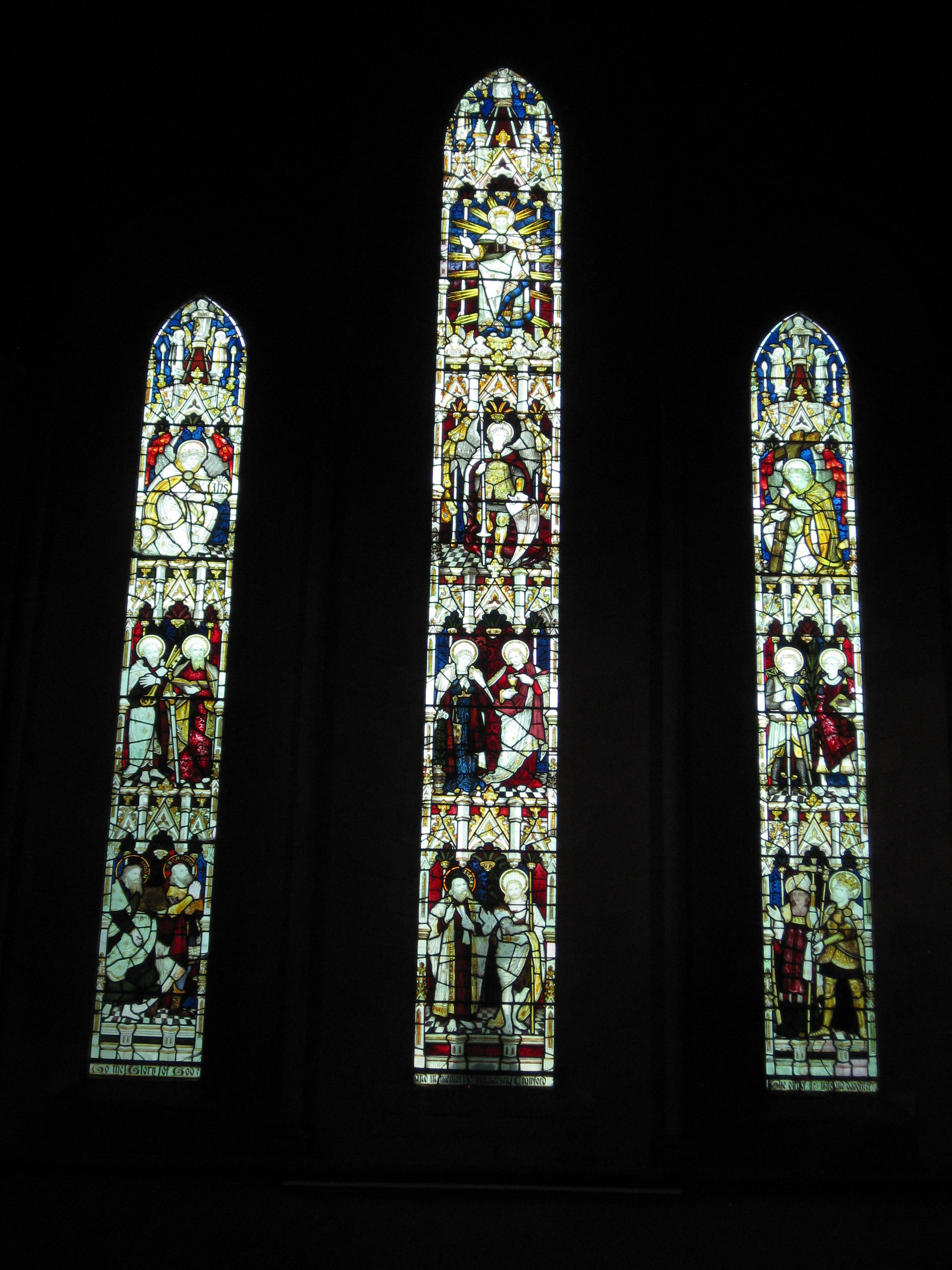
Stained glass window by Charles Eamer Kempe

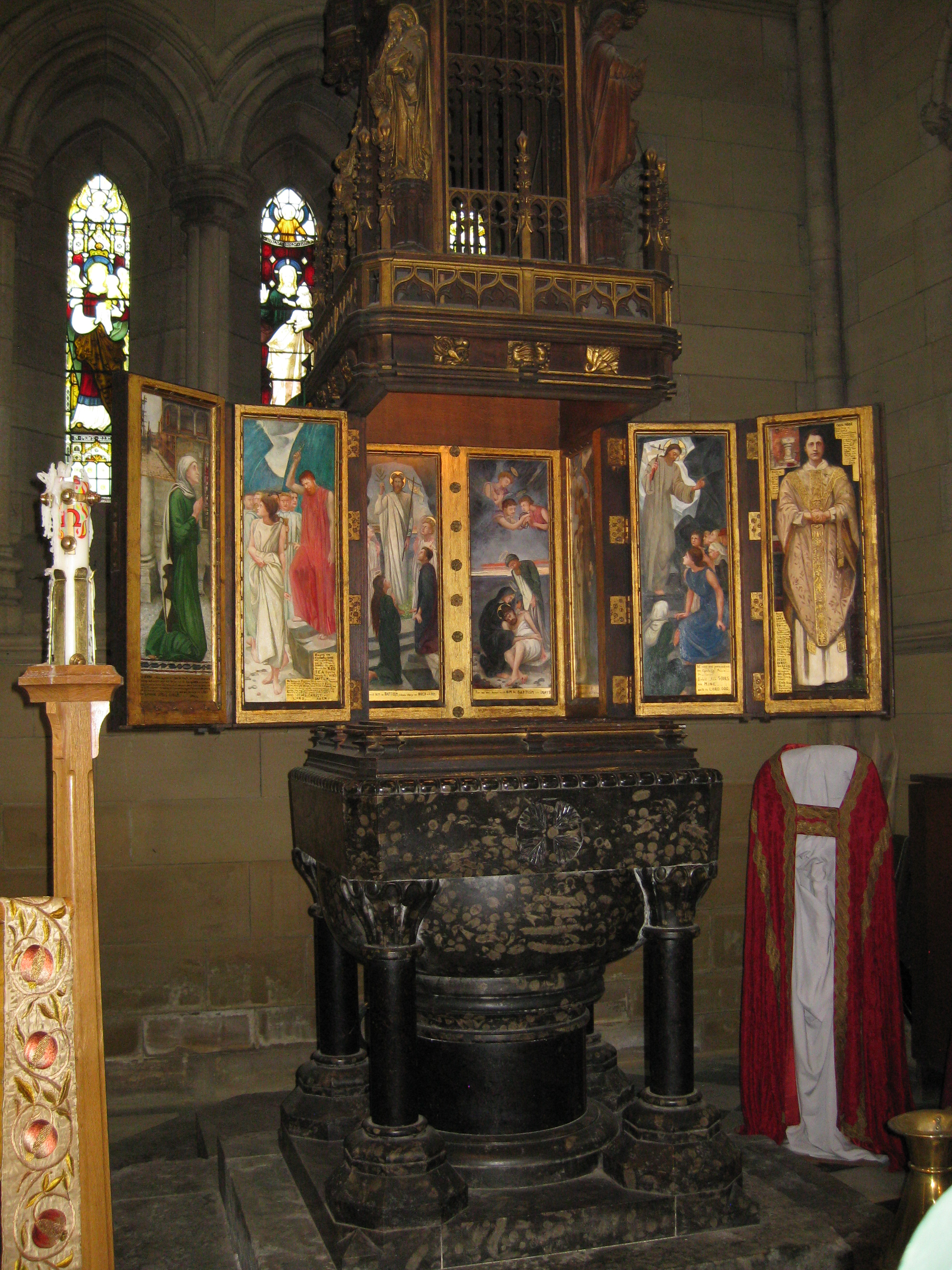
Baptismal font
