= St Mark's Church, Woodhouse, Leeds =

Gateway Church
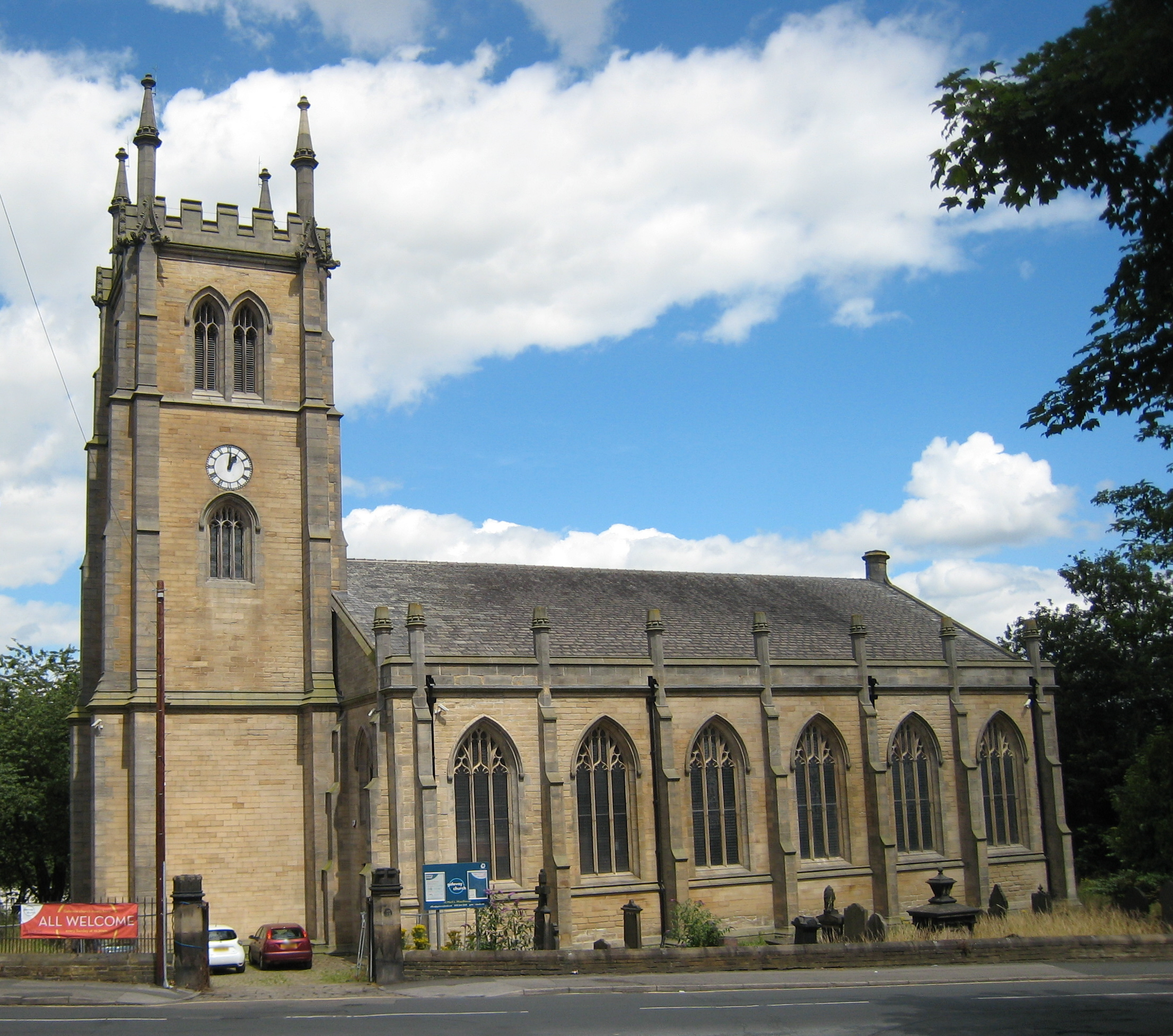
- Gateway Church
- 53°48′42.9″N 1°33′11.9″W
- OS grid reference: SE 29507 35167
- Location: St Mark's Street, Woodhouse, Leeds
- Country: England
- Denomination: Evangelical
- Website: gatewayleeds.net

History
- Status: Parish Church

Architecture
- Heritage designation: Grade II listed building
- Style: Gothic Revival
- Groundbreaking: 1823
- Completed: 1826

Gateway Church (formerly St Mark's Church) in Woodhouse, Leeds, West Yorkshire, England is an Evangelical church. It was the Anglican parish church of St Mark until its closure in 2005. It reopened as Gateway Church in 2014.

== History ==
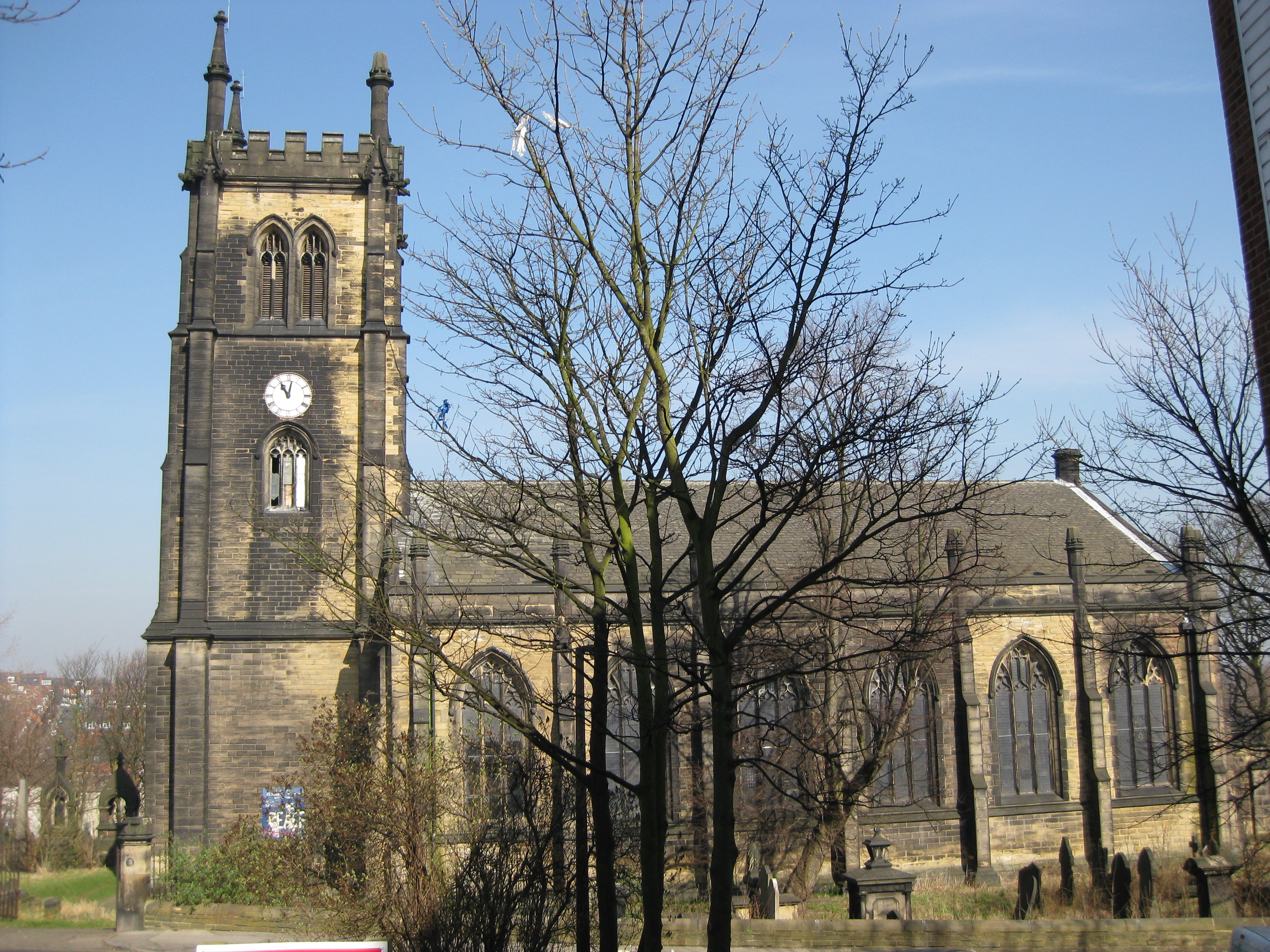
The church in 2009 during its redundancy; note the damaged pinnacles and colour of the stonework before cleaning.

St Mark's was built as a Church of England Commissioners' Church between 1823 and 1825 by Peter Atkinson Junior and Richard Hey Sharp, and consecrated in January 1826. A parish was formed for the church in 1831 by dividing the extensive parish of St Peter which had seen a large increase in population.

The west gallery was added in 1832–1833. A south gallery added in 1837–1837 was removed in the early 20th century. Local architects Adams & Kelly added tracery to the windows and replaced the pews (originally box pews) in 1873. The church has fine stained glass by Clayton and Bell, and others.

St Mark's was one of three Commissioners' churches built in Leeds, and is the only one to survive. The church was declared redundant in 2001; it fell into a state of relative disrepair and was listed on Historic England's 'Buildings at Risk' register.

=== Gateway Church ===
The building and grounds were bought in 2008 by Gateway Buildings Trust, a registered charity and private company closely linked to Gateway Church, a local evangelical charity established in 2000. The trust carried out repair, renovation and interior remodelling at a reported cost of £1.5 million, largely funded by Historic England.

Gateway Church began to meet at the church in 2014. The building is also used for community meetings and conferences.

== Architectural style ==
=== Exterior ===
The church is built of coursed squared stone and ashlar with a pitched slate roof. The church has a west tower made up of three stages. The church has a six-bay nave and chancel. The tower has a west door, two-light belfry windows and three-light windows to its second stage. It is topped by octagonal pinnacles.

=== Interior ===
The church has a single continuous nave and chancel with a vestry and oak-cased organ at the east end of the north aisle and a side chapel at the east end of the south aisle. There is a reredos of carved stone. There is a painted octagonal stone font and an octagonal pulpit with traceried panels installed as a memorial to the Reverend J. S. Abbott in 1891. A mezzanine level was added during the 21st-century renovation, dividing some of the windows, to create meeting rooms and a café below.

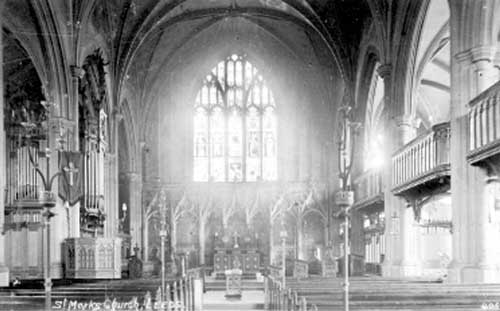
Church interior between 1900 and 1914

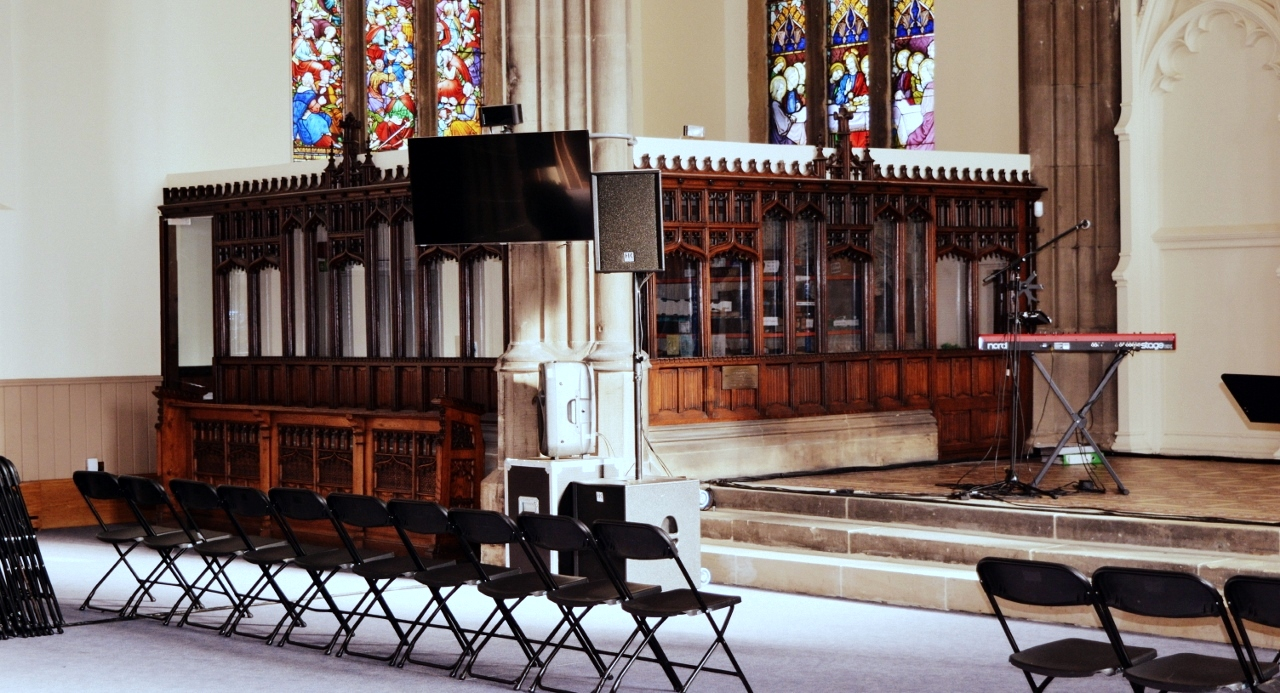
The chancel with three steps up

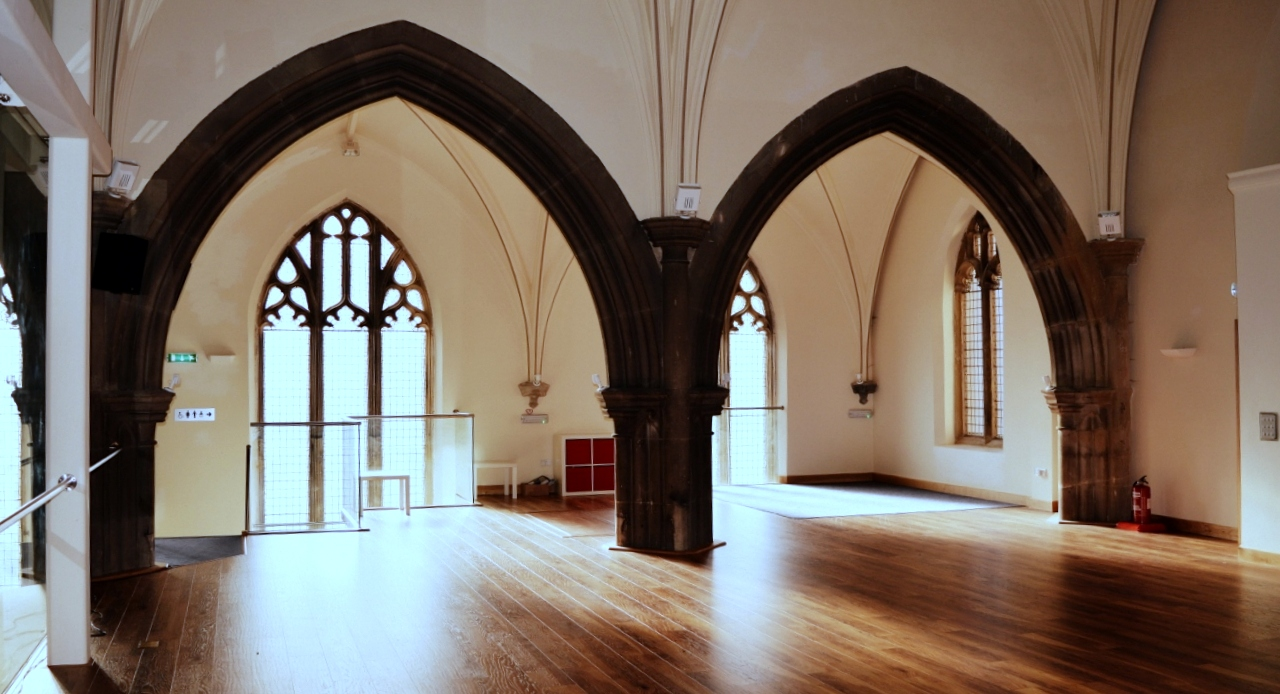
Mezzanine level added during renovation

== Monuments and memorials ==
The churchyard has a tall monument with two angels, to local architectural sculptor Robert Mawer (1807–1854), who made works for several West Riding churches. It was probably carved by his wife Catherine (1803–1877). The monument was Grade II listed in 1997, but since then an urn and the heads of the angels have been removed.

On the north wall of the nave a crocketed arch has a plaque carved with ivy leaves commemorating William Schofield (d. 1857), John Coultate (d. 1864), and Hannah (d. 1860) and Alice (d. 1863) Craven. There is a monument to the east end of the north aisle inside the vestry dedicated to Susannah Blesard (d. 1856). Since the renovation most of the monument is concealed behind shelving. The monument was carved by Catherine Mawer and is now in a worn condition.

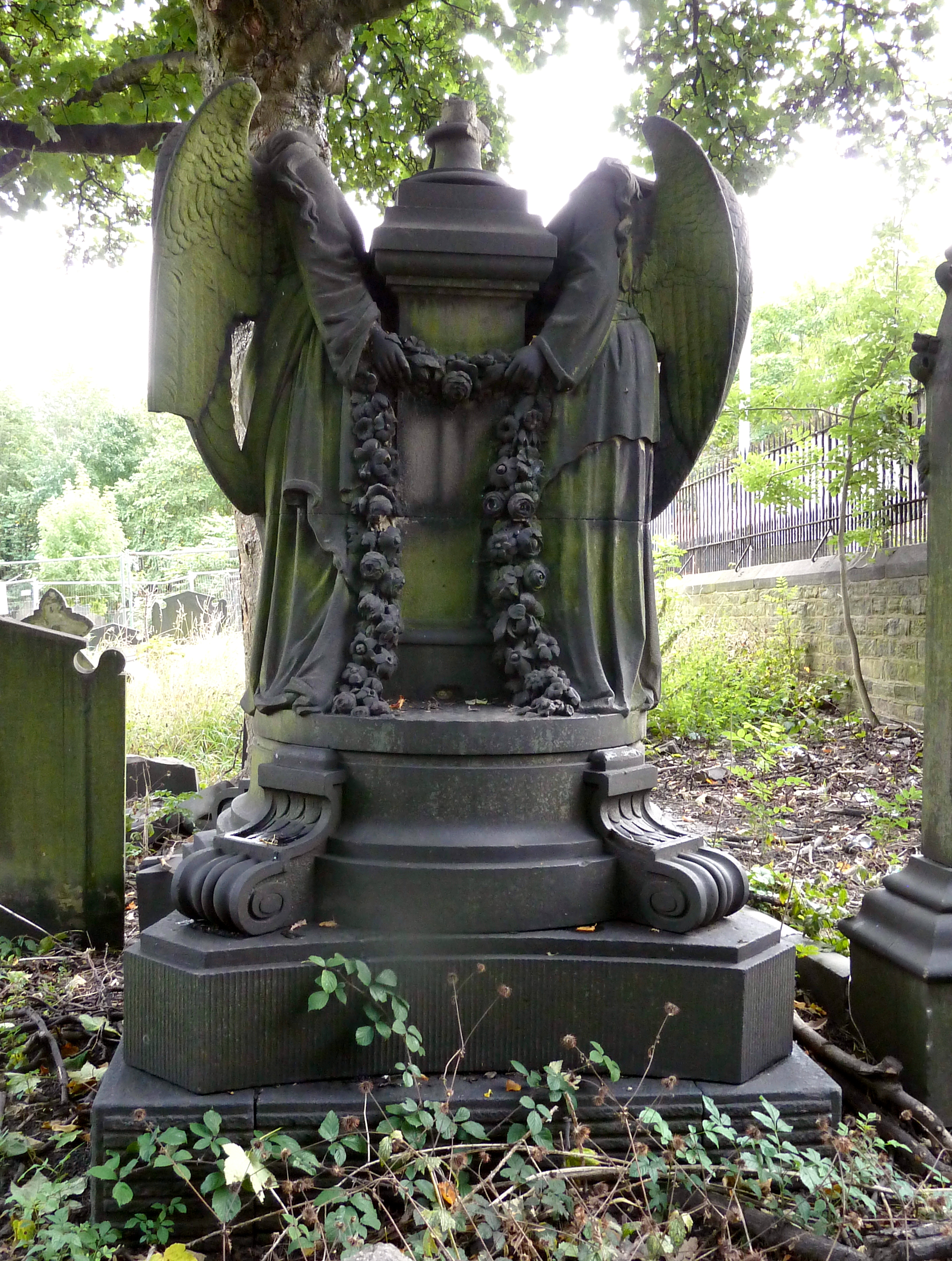
Monument to Robert Mawer

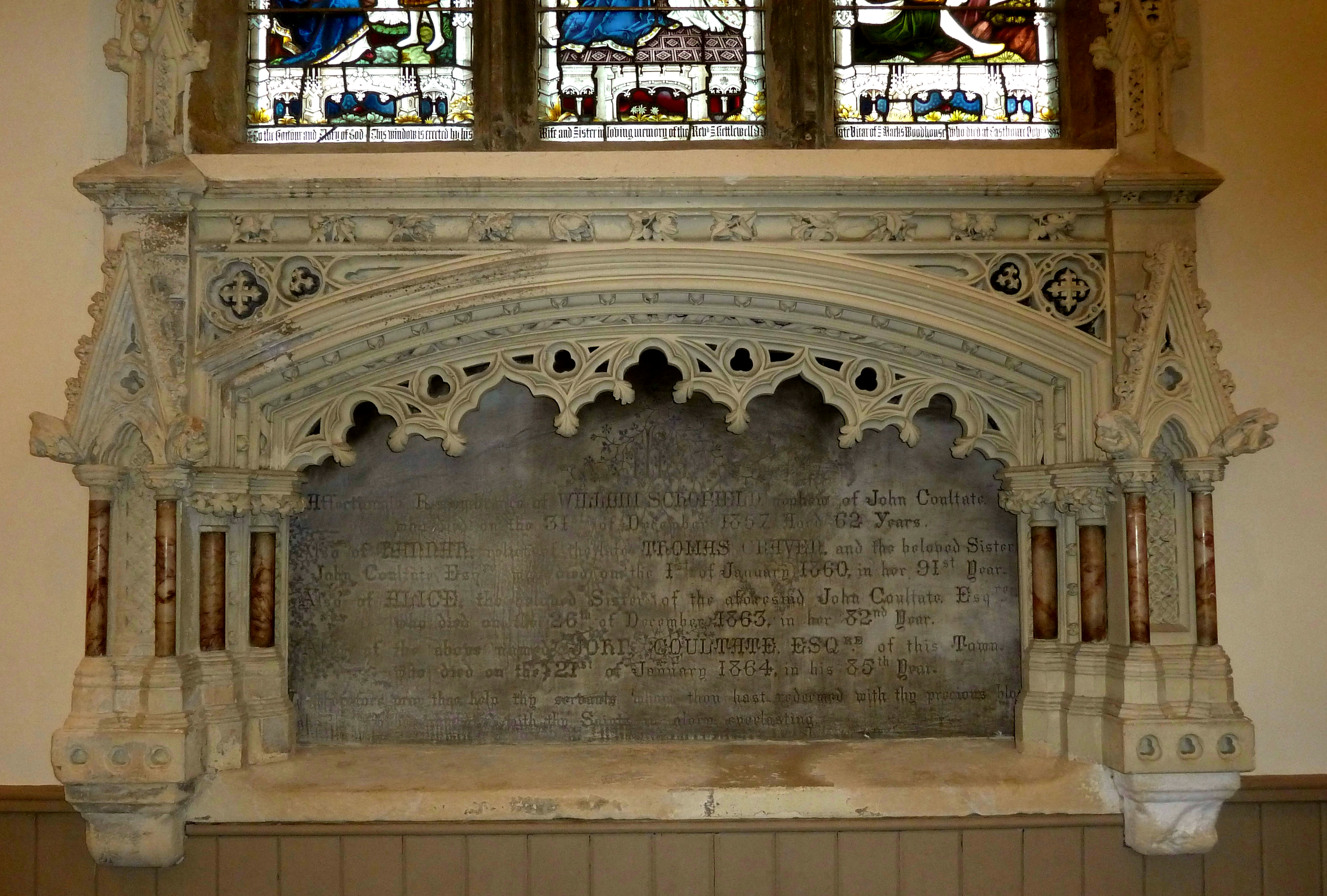
Schofield-Coultate memorial

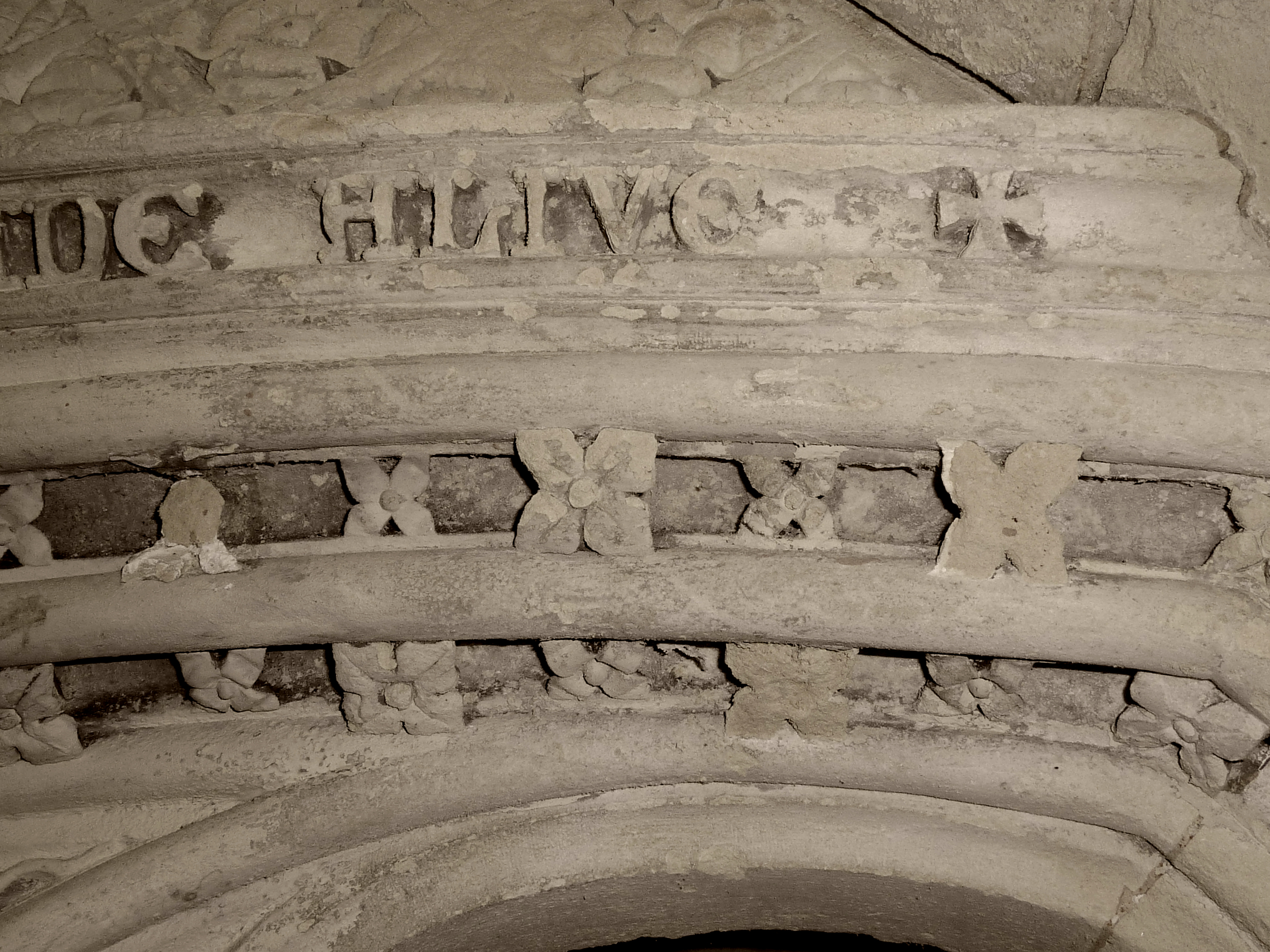
Susannah Blesard memorial

== Filming location ==
The church was used as the 'Parish Church of St Matthew' in 2014 ITV series The Beiderbecke Affair. The interior shots, including the crypt which featured heavily, were filmed however in St Peter's Church in Stanley (demolished 2014).

== See also ==
- List of places of worship in the City of Leeds
- Listed buildings in Leeds (Hyde Park and Woodhouse)
