= Edward Burroughs =

Bishop of Ripon; Dean of Bristol; British Anglican bishop

Burroughs in 1933.

Edward Arthur Burroughs (1 October 1882 – 23 August 1934) was an English writer and Anglican bishop.

He was born into an ecclesiastical family - his father was William Edward Burroughs (1845–1931), rector of the Mariners' Church, Dún Laoghaire and later prebendary of Exeter Cathedral. He was educated at Harrow School and Balliol College, Oxford, and was ordained in 1908.

He was Fellow, Lecturer and Tutor at Hertford College, Oxford and an Honorary Chaplain to the King before being appointed Dean of Bristol in 1922. Four years later he was ordained to the episcopate as Bishop of Ripon. At the opening ceremony of the Hostel of the Resurrection in Leeds in 1928 Burroughs caused controversy when he described modern universities such as Leeds as "counterfeit presentations" when compared to the "real thing(s)" of Oxford and Cambridge. His comments were denounced by others at the ceremony, and Burroughs was forced to withdraw his words in a statement to the press the following week.

He died on 23 August 1934.

Church of England titles
Preceded by Basil Wynne Willson	Dean of Bristol; 1922–1926	Succeeded by Henry de Candole
Preceded by Thomas Strong	Bishop of Ripon; 1926–1934	Succeeded by Geoffrey Lunt
