= Hostel of the Resurrection =

- Priory of St Wilfrid
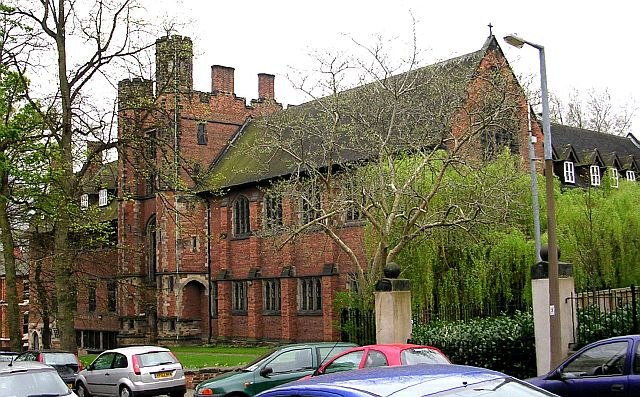
- Location: Leeds
- Coordinates: 53°48′17″N 1°33′32″W
- OS grid reference: SE 291 343
- Area: West Yorkshire
- Built: 1908–1928
- Architect: Temple Moore

Listed Building – Grade II*
- Official name: Adult Education Centre, University of Leeds
- Designated: 26 September 1963
- Reference no.: 1256039

The Hostel of the Resurrection also known as the Priory of St Wilfred and later as the Adult Education Centre at the University of Leeds is a former student hostel in Leeds. A designated Grade II* listed building in Leeds, West Yorkshire, England, the building is now privately owned and is again student accommodation.

== History ==
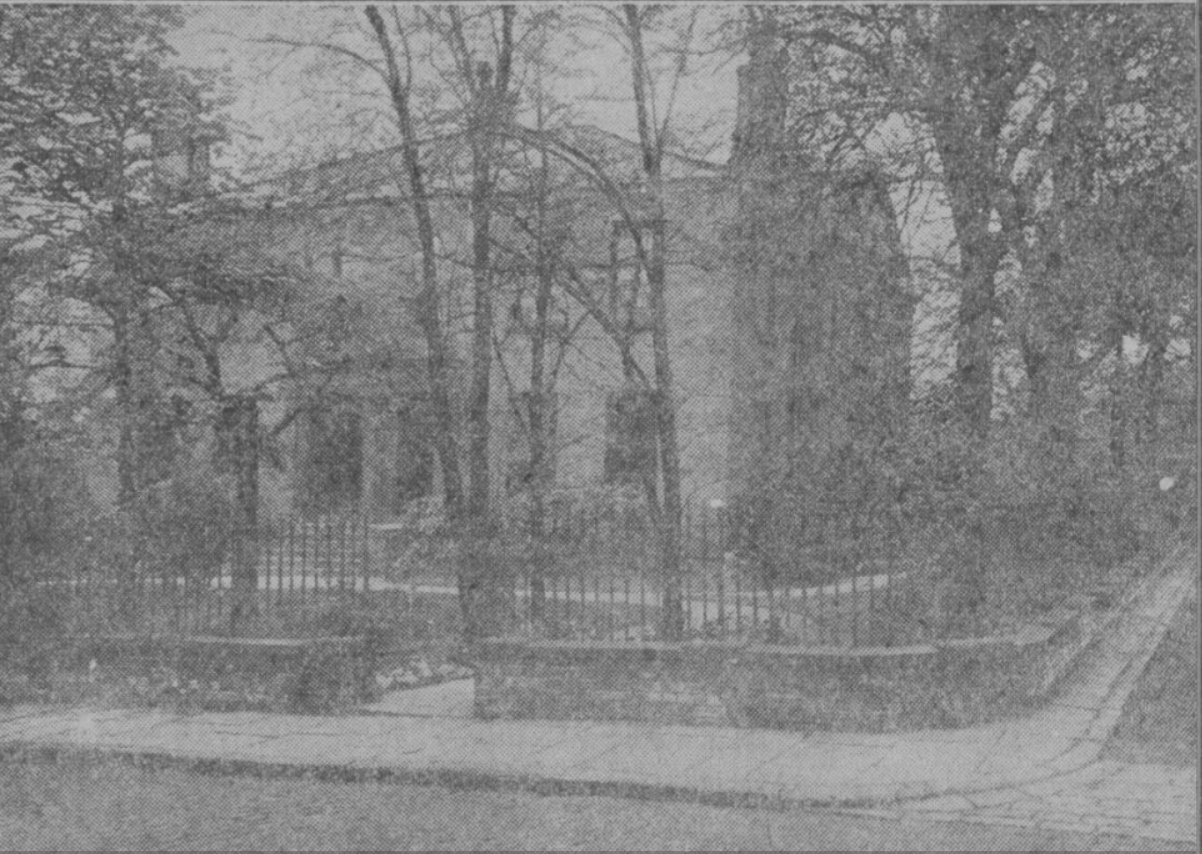
The original hostel at 21–23 Springfield Mount. Demolished in 1908 to allow for the construction of the current building.

The hostel was commissioned by the Community of the Resurrection (CR). In 1903 CR had founded the College of the Resurrection to train men for the Anglican priesthood. Part of the training was undertaken at Leeds University and CR looked for suitable accommodation for their students. Two existing buildings at numbers 21 and 23 Springfield Mount was identified and acquired by CR and began lodging students in 1904.

In 1907 CR began an appeal for funds to build a new hostel on the Springfield Mount site. Meetings seeking support for the hostel were frequently disrupted by John Kensit and members of the Protestant Truth Society who objected to the Anglo-Catholicism monasticism of CR, meetings targeted included a meeting at Church House, Westminster addressed by Randall Davidson, then Archbishop of Canterbury.

Despite the interruptions the funds were raised and the existing buildings were demolished. CR employed Temple Moore to design the new building which could accommodate 36 students. The new building was officially opened on 23 April 1910 by Lady Lucy Cavendish. Further extensions to the hostel were made after the First World War and it was not until 18 October 1928 that the final accommodation wing and chapel were opened, the hostel now providing accommodation for 55 students. At the opening ceremony the Bishop of Ripon, Edward Burroughs caused controversy when he described modern universities such as Leeds as "counterfeit presentations" when compared to the "real thing(s)" of Oxford and Cambridge. His comments denounced by others at the ceremony, Burroughs was forced to withdraw his words in a statement to the press the following week.

Staff at the hostel in 1953 comprised a warden, sub-warden and a tutor from CR's Mirfield community.

In 1976 CR closed the hostel and sold the building to Leeds University who converted it from accommodation to an adult education centre. In turn, the University sold the building on to a private company, Springfield Mount Estates, who converted the building back to student accommodation in 2007. As of 2020 the building now known as The Priory is owned by the Unite Group plc and provides accommodation for up to 77 students.

== Architecture ==
Moore designed the hostel in the Tudor Revival style. Built of red brick on a stone plinth with Millstone Grit dressings and a tiled roof, the hostel was arranged in a U-shape around a central courtyard. The bricks came from Boroughbridge in North Yorkshire and the grit sandstone was quarried from Pool Bank Quarries at Pool-in-Wharfedale. As originally designed the central block comprises a four storey gatehouse tower containing a staircase to all levels. To the left of the central block is the former refectory and accommodation block which is a three storey building of five bays including an attic story with gabled dormer windows. A basement level was below as the building stands on a slope. The former chapel block forms the other wing and was also of two storeys and five bays with buttressed walls, the chapel was on the upper floor with the library and the warden's office on the ground floor. Both the chapel range and the accommodation range have wings going off them to form the overall U-shape in the same style.

Temple Moore died in 1920 and the later works on the hostel were designed and undertaken by his business partner and son-in-law Leslie Moore.

== See also ==
- Grade II* listed buildings in Leeds
- Listed buildings in Leeds (Hyde Park and Woodhouse)
