= Grade II* listed buildings in Leeds =

There are over 20,000 Grade II* listed buildings in England. This page is a list of these buildings in the metropolitan borough of Leeds in West Yorkshire.

== Lists ==
Name	Location	Type	Completed (Note: The date given is the date used by Historic England as significant for the initial building or that of an important part in the structure's description.)	Date designated	Grid ref. (Note: Sometimes known as OSGB36, the grid reference is based on the British national grid reference system used by the Ordnance Survey.) Geo-coordinates	Entry number (Note: The "List Entry Number" is a unique number assigned to each listed building and scheduled monument by Historic England.)	Image
The Nunnery	Arthington, Leeds	House	1585	6 February 1952	SE2887845151; 53°54′06″N 1°33′43″W	1262941	The Nunnery More images
Church of All Saints	Barwick-in-Elmet, Leeds	Church	1455	22 July 1986	SE4008537410; 53°49′53″N 1°23′33″W	1357161	Church of All Saints More images
Obelisk and Enclosing Railings approx. 200 Metres South East of Rotunda in Black Fen Pleasure Grounds	Bramham Park, Barwick in Elmet and Scholes, Leeds	Wall	1768-1772	1 May 1960	SE4146940654; 53°51′38″N 1°22′15″W	1065974	Obelisk and Enclosing Railings approx. 200 Metres South East of Rotunda in Black Fen Pleasure Grounds More images
Temple of Leod Lud about 300m due south of the Rotunda in the Black Fen Pleasure Grounds	Bramham Park, Barwick in Elmet and Scholes, Leeds	Garden Temple	Mid 18th century	1 May 1960	SE4132840497; 53°51′33″N 1°22′23″W	1065978	Temple of Leod Lud about 300m due south of the Rotunda in the Black Fen Pleasure Grounds More images
West Wing, Potterton Hall	Potterton Park, Barwick in Elmet and Scholes, Leeds	House	c. 1740	1 October 1982	SE4060938994; 53°50′44″N 1°23′03″W	1065985	West Wing, Potterton Hall
Bramham Biggin	Bramham, Bramham cum Oglethorpe, Leeds	House	17th century	30 March 1966	SE4224342310; 53°52′31″N 1°21′32″W	1135632	Bramham Biggin More images
Church of All Saints	Bramham cum Oglethorpe, Leeds	Parish Church	12th century	30 March 1966	SE4271543036; 53°52′54″N 1°21′06″W	1313180	Church of All Saints More images
Church of St Oswald	Collingham, Leeds	Church	Slightly later than C7	22 July 1986	SE3901546096; 53°54′34″N 1°24′27″W	1225846	Church of St Oswald More images
Double Terrace to South Front of Harewood House including retaining Walls and Steps, Flower Bed Surrounds, Fountains, Garden Ornaments and Sculptures	Harewood, Leeds	Balustrade	1847-8	22 July 1986	SE3117744571; 53°53′47″N 1°31′37″W	1226148	Double Terrace to South Front of Harewood House including retaining Walls and Steps, Flower Bed Surrounds, Fountains, Garden Ornaments and Sculptures More images
Main Gateway, Lodges and Linking Walls to Harewood House	Harewood Park, Harewood, Leeds	Gate	1802-4	30 March 1966	SE3218844941; 53°53′59″N 1°30′42″W	1226352	Main Gateway, Lodges and Linking Walls to Harewood House More images
22–27 Harrogate Road	Harewood, Leeds	House	1966	30 March 1966	SE3220845018; 53°54′01″N 1°30′41″W	1226850	Upload Photo
2–5 The Avenue	Harewood, Leeds	Bothy	Mid-late 18th century	30 March 1966	SE3236245018; 53°54′01″N 1°30′32″W	1226637	2–5 The Avenue More images
6–10 The Avenue	Harewood, Leeds	Estate Cottage	Mid-late 18th century	30 March 1966	SE3232345013; 53°54′01″N 1°30′34″W	1226819	6–10 The Avenue
11 The Avenue	Harewood, Leeds	House	1966	30 March 1966	SE3229745013; 53°54′01″N 1°30′36″W	1226843	Upload Photo
12–15 The Avenue	Harewood, Leeds	House	1770	30 March 1966	SE3228245009; 53°54′01″N 1°30′37″W	1265739	12–15 The Avenue
16 The Avenue	Harewood, Leeds	Managers House	Mid-late 18th century	30 March 1966	SE3225345011; 53°54′01″N 1°30′38″W	1226651	16 The Avenue
Garden House at North End of West Terrace of Ledston Hall	Ledston, Leeds	Garden House	c. 1720	4 July 1952	SE4351228978; 53°45′19″N 1°20′30″W	1237514	Upload Photo
Gate Piers on Former Drive Approximately 150 Metres North of Ledston Hall	Ledston, Leeds	Gate	Mid 18th century	4 July 1952	SE4351929100; 53°45′23″N 1°20′29″W	1264016	Upload Photo
Lotherton Chapel	Lotherton Park, Lotherton cum Aberford, Leeds	Chapel	Late 12th century	3 February 1967	SE4493736036; 53°49′07″N 1°19′08″W	1200687	Lotherton Chapel More images
Manor Club	Otley, Leeds	House	17th century	30 July 1951	SE2017545622; 53°54′23″N 1°41′40″W	1200411	Manor Club More images
The Old Hall	Otley, Leeds	House	18th century or possibly 1690	30 July 1951	SE2017145508; 53°54′19″N 1°41′40″W	1135236	The Old Hall More images
Gascoigne Almshouses and Attached Wardens Cottage	Aberford	House	1843-5	4 July 1952	SE4323636375; 53°49′19″N 1°20′41″W	1300616	Gascoigne Almshouses and Attached Wardens Cottage More images
Triumphal Arch	Parlington Park, Parlington, Leeds	Triumphal Arch	1783	10 August 1983	SE4218136552; 53°49′25″N 1°21′39″W	1135624	Triumphal Arch More images
Church of St Mary	Swillington, Leeds	Parish Church	Late 14th century	3 February 1967	SE3849430469; 53°46′09″N 1°25′03″W	1247710	Church of St Mary More images
Leventhorpe Hall	Swillington, Leeds	House	1774	5 July 1978	SE3687730037; 53°45′55″N 1°26′31″W	1247691	Upload Photo
Thorp Arch Hall Including East Wing and West Wing	Thorp Arch, Leeds	House	1988	30 March 1966	SE4295946284; 53°54′39″N 1°20′51″W	1116216	Upload Photo
Church of St Peter	Walton, Leeds	Church	12th century	30 March 1966	SE4411447819; 53°55′29″N 1°19′47″W	1115540	Church of St Peter More images
Adult Education Centre, University of Leeds	University Campus, Leeds	Hostel	1908-1928	26 September 1963	SE2911834372; 53°48′17″N 1°33′34″W	1256039	Adult Education Centre, University of Leeds More images
Armley Mills Main Range	Armley, Leeds	Bridge	1797	19 October 1951	SE2756434137; 53°48′10″N 1°34′59″W	1255747	Armley Mills Main Range More images
Armley Prison: Entrance Range and Flanking Walls	Armley, Leeds	Tower	1847	5 August 1976	SE2805533360; 53°47′45″N 1°34′32″W	1256248	Armley Prison: Entrance Range and Flanking Walls More images
Armley Prison: Inner Range	Armley, Leeds	Steps	1847	5 August 1976	SE2795633352; 53°47′45″N 1°34′37″W	1256249	Upload Photo
Armley Prison: Revetment Wall on East Side of Gloucester Terrace	Armley, Leeds	Prison	c1847 (After 1847)	5 October 1994	SE2806233382; 53°47′46″N 1°34′32″W	1256250	Upload Photo
Austhorpe Hall	Austhorpe, Leeds	Country House	1694	26 September 1963	SE3698634131; 53°48′08″N 1°26′24″W	1256314	Austhorpe Hall More images
Chadwick Lodge and Attached Walls and Railings	Leeds	House	Late 18th century	26 September 1963	SE3066932998; 53°47′33″N 1°32′09″W	1375265	Chadwick Lodge and Attached Walls and Railings More images
Church House	Calverley, Leeds	Semi Detached House	Mid 18th century	25 May 1966	SE2079337157; 53°49′49″N 1°41′08″W	1266011	Church House More images
Church of All Souls with Boundary Wall and War Memorial	Leeds	Church	1876-1880	26 September 1963	SE2994334722; 53°48′29″N 1°32′48″W	1255888	Church of All Souls with Boundary Wall and War Memorial More images
Church of St Aidan	Harehills, Leeds	Anglican Church	1891-1894	26 September 1963	SE3165635254; 53°48′45″N 1°31′15″W	1256175	Church of St Aidan More images
Church of St Bartholomew	Armley, Leeds	Anglican Church	1872-1877	26 September 1963	SE2730133209; 53°47′40″N 1°35′13″W	1255697	Church of St Bartholomew More images
Church of St Chad	Far Headingley, Leeds	Church	1868	26 September 1963	SE2733536897; 53°49′39″N 1°35′10″W	1375301	Church of St Chad More images
Church of St John the Evangelist	Oulton	Church	1827-9	5 June 1964	SE3597228095; 53°44′53″N 1°27′22″W	1135676	Church of St John the Evangelist More images
Church of St Margaret of Antioch	Burley, Leeds	Anglican Church	1908-1909	26 August 1963	SE2813934931; 53°48′36″N 1°34′27″W	1255673	Church of St Margaret of Antioch More images
Church of St Matthew	Chapel Allerton, Leeds	Anglican Church	1897-1898	23 September 1963	SE3030237373; 53°49′54″N 1°32′28″W	1255680	Church of St Matthew More images
Church of St Matthias	Burley, Leeds	Anglican Church	1854	5 August 1976	SE2781334599; 53°48′25″N 1°34′45″W	1256114	Church of St Matthias More images
Church of St Michael	Headingley, Leeds	Anglican Church	1884-5	26 September 1963	SE2801135957; 53°49′09″N 1°34′34″W	1255967	Church of St Michael More images
Church of St Wilfrid	Calverley, Leeds	Church	1154	25 May 1966	SE2083437172; 53°49′49″N 1°41′06″W	1226034	Church of St Wilfrid More images
Church of St Wilfrid	Halton, Leeds	Anglican Church	1938	19 March 1981	SE3470233680; 53°47′54″N 1°28′29″W	1256092	Church of St Wilfrid More images
Leeds City Varieties	Leeds	Music Hall	Late 18th century	15 February 1960	SE3020933721; 53°47′56″N 1°32′34″W	1255972	Leeds City Varieties More images
Civic Court and Attached Railings	Leeds	Drawing Office	1879-1881	26 September 1963	SE2982533908; 53°48′02″N 1°32′55″W	1255773	Civic Court and Attached Railings More images
Civic Hall	Leeds	Town Hall	1933	5 August 1976	SE2983434081; 53°48′08″N 1°32′55″W	1255781	Civic Hall More images
Denison Hall	Leeds	Villa	1786	19 October 1951	SE2909234083; 53°48′08″N 1°33′35″W	1256073	Denison Hall More images
East Ardsley Old Hall	East Ardsley, Leeds	House	1632	3 July 1985	SE3056825268; 53°43′23″N 1°32′18″W	1250736	East Ardsley Old Hall More images
First Leeds Cloth Hall	Leeds	Cloth Hall	1711	16 June 1983	SE3044733422; 53°47′46″N 1°32′21″W	1375042	First Leeds Cloth Hall More images
Former Flax Warehouse to Marshall's Mill	Holbeck, Leeds	Shop	1808	9 March 1987	SE2949532887; 53°47′29″N 1°33′14″W	1375161	Former Flax Warehouse to Marshall's Mill
Former Foundry Building for Fenton Murray and Wood Engineers	Holbeck, Leeds	Foundry	c. 1795	25 August 1987	SE2960732900; 53°47′30″N 1°33′07″W	1375467	Former Foundry Building for Fenton Murray and Wood Engineers
Former Machine and Fitting Shops for Fenton Murray and Wood Engineers	Holbeck, Leeds	Fitters Workshop	Extension by	25 August 1987	SE2961232872; 53°47′29″N 1°33′07″W	1375468	Former Machine and Fitting Shops for Fenton Murray and Wood Engineers
Former Leeds and Liverpool Canal Company Warehouse	Leeds	Fireproof Building	Mid/Late 19th century	5 August 1976	SE2984033030; 53°47′34″N 1°32′55″W	1255696	Former Leeds and Liverpool Canal Company Warehouse
Gate Lodge to Temple Mill	Holbeck, Leeds	Gate Lodge	1843	19 October 1951	SE2955032766; 53°47′25″N 1°33′11″W	1375166	Gate Lodge to Temple Mill
Gatehouse at Kirkstall Abbey (Abbey House Museum)	Kirkstall, Leeds	Abbey	12th century	26 September 1963	SE2596136293; 53°49′20″N 1°36′26″W	1256646	Gatehouse at Kirkstall Abbey (Abbey House Museum) More images
Gazebo approx. 100 Metres North of Clumpcliffe Farmhouse	Methley, Leeds	Gazebo	1708	5 June 1964	SE3699026986; 53°44′17″N 1°26′27″W	1135669	Upload Photo
Gledhow Hall	Gledhow, Leeds	Apartment	18th century	22 September 1975	SE3156637049; 53°49′44″N 1°31′19″W	1256270	Gledhow Hall More images
Grand Theatre Including Former Assembly Rooms	Leeds	Assembly Rooms	1877-1878	15 February 1960	SE3032033834; 53°48′00″N 1°32′28″W	1375219	Grand Theatre Including Former Assembly Rooms More images
Hawksworth Hall	Hawksworth, Guiseley, Leeds	House	Early 16th century	19 October 1962	SE1690341692; 53°52′16″N 1°44′40″W	1251067	Hawksworth Hall More images
Hunslet Mill	Hunslet, Leeds	Flax Mill	c1842 (after 1838)	10 January 1986	SE3130432156; 53°47′05″N 1°31′35″W	1256253	Hunslet Mill More images
Leeds Civic Theatre and College of Music	Leeds	Municipal building	1865-1868	19 October 1951	SE2995334037; 53°48′06″N 1°32′48″W	1375225	Leeds Civic Theatre and College of Music More images
Leeds Club Premises and Basement Railings	Leeds	Club	1863	18 May 2000	SE3010933614; 53°47′53″N 1°32′40″W	1256654	Leeds Club Premises and Basement Railings More images
Marshall Mills	Holbeck, Leeds	Flax Mill	1817	9 March 1987	SE2953432799; 53°47′26″N 1°33′11″W	1375160	Marshall Mills More images
Memorial to Queen Victoria	Woodhouse Moor, Leeds	Commemorative Monument	1903	5 August 1976	SE2920735070; 53°48′40″N 1°33′29″W	1255642	Memorial to Queen Victoria More images
Mill Hill Chapel	Leeds	Church Hall	c. 1960	26 September 1963	SE2996633476; 53°47′48″N 1°32′48″W	1375430	Mill Hill Chapel More images
Municipal Buildings Including City Museum, Public Library and Attached Railings	Leeds	Local Government Office	1878-1884	26 September 1963	SE2982433849; 53°48′00″N 1°32′55″W	1255783	Municipal Buildings Including City Museum, Public Library and Attached Railings More images
Nesbit Hall	Leeds	House	Pre 1761	30 June 1982	SE2148632090; 53°47′05″N 1°40′31″W	1135082	Nesbit Hall More images
Newlay Bridge	Newlay, Leeds	Road Bridge	1819	5 August 1976	SE2387836940; 53°49′41″N 1°38′19″W	1375481	Newlay Bridge More images
Numbers 1-43 and Cross Arcade	Leeds	Gate	1900	25 April 1974	SE3032233653; 53°47′54″N 1°32′28″W	1256197	Numbers 1-43 and Cross Arcade
16-20 Commercial St, Leeds including Leeds Library (18)	Leeds	Shop	1808	19 October 1951	SE3010433559; 53°47′51″N 1°32′40″W	1375154	16-20 Commercial St, Leeds including Leeds Library (18) More images
228 and 230, Leeds Road	Lofthouse, Leeds	Farmhouse	Mid 17th century	5 June 1964	SE3328626124; 53°43′50″N 1°29′49″W	1313491	228 and 230, Leeds Road More images
Rawdon Hall	Aireborough, Leeds	House	17th century	19 October 1962	SE2115639169; 53°50′54″N 1°40′48″W	1281301	Upload Photo
Rectory Hall	Aireborough, Leeds	House	1962	19 October 1962	SE1949942092; 53°52′29″N 1°42′18″W	1262939	Upload Photo
Remains of North West Range of White Cloth Hall including Entrance	Leeds	Cloth Hall	1776	19 October 1951	SE3041733348; 53°47′44″N 1°32′23″W	1375283	Remains of North West Range of White Cloth Hall including Entrance
River Lock and Retaining Walls to River Aire	Leeds	River Lock	1770-1776	7 December 1992	SE2984633044; 53°47′34″N 1°32′54″W	1255707	River Lock and Retaining Walls to River Aire
Roger Stevens Building	Leeds	University	1970	10 June 2010	SE2943134378; 53°48′18″N 1°33′17″W	1393836	Roger Stevens Building More images
Roman Catholic Cathedral of St Anne	Leeds	Priests House	1902-1904	26 September 1963	SE2994733908; 53°48′02″N 1°32′48″W	1375230	Roman Catholic Cathedral of St Anne More images
Spenfield	Weetwood, Leeds	House	c. 1890	5 May 1975	SE2699237568; 53°50′01″N 1°35′29″W	1375329	Spenfield More images
St Mary's Convent Church	Richmond Hill, Leeds	Roman Catholic Church	1852	5 August 1976	SE3130433169; 53°47′38″N 1°31′35″W	1255558	St Mary's Convent Church More images
St Paul's House and Attached Railings and Gates	Leeds	Gate	1878	26 September 1963	SE2956933664; 53°47′54″N 1°33′09″W	1256126	St Paul's House and Attached Railings and Gates More images
Stables at Temple Newsam	Temple Newsam, Leeds	Workshop	1951	19 October 1951	SE3580932186; 53°47′05″N 1°27′29″W	1255954	Stables at Temple Newsam More images
Stank Hall Barn	Beeston, Leeds	Chapel	17th century	19 October 1951	SE2853529139; 53°45′28″N 1°34′07″W	1375339	Stank Hall Barn More images
Statue of the Black Prince	Leeds City Square	Statue	1903	26 September 1963	SE2989833434; 53°47′47″N 1°32′51″W	1375045	Statue of the Black Prince More images
The Garden Gate Public House	Leeds	Public House	1902-1903	21 February 1972	SE3120231672; 53°46′50″N 1°31′41″W	1255677	The Garden Gate Public House More images
The Grange	Beckett Park, Leeds	Country House	1752	19 October 1951	SE2679436689; 53°49′33″N 1°35′40″W	1256304	The Grange More images
The Manor House, Cad Beeston	Beeston Hill, Leeds	House	Early 19th century	7 October 1985	SE2922931429; 53°46′42″N 1°33′29″W	1255940	Upload Photo
The Nookin	Oulton, Leeds	House	1611	27 May 1960	SE3592728326; 53°45′00″N 1°27′24″W	1135675	The Nookin More images
The Round House (Leeds Commercial Van and Truck Rental Premises)	Leeds	Garage	C20	19 June 1986	SE2878833213; 53°47′40″N 1°33′52″W	1255725	The Round House (Leeds Commercial Van and Truck Rental Premises) More images
Thorpe Hall	Thorpe on the Hill, Leeds	House	1735	5 June 1964	SE3161027009; 53°44′19″N 1°31′20″W	1135039	Upload Photo
Time Ball Buildings	Leeds	House	Early 19th century	22 March 1974	SE3021333361; 53°47′44″N 1°32′34″W	1255855	Time Ball Buildings More images
Tower Works, Boiler House Chimney	Holbeck, Leeds	Chimney	1864	5 August 1976	SE2958833018; 53°47′34″N 1°33′08″W	1256246	Tower Works, Boiler House Chimney
Tower Works, the Giotto Tower Dust Extraction Chimney	Holbeck, Leeds	Chimney	1899	5 August 1976	SE2954832998; 53°47′33″N 1°33′11″W	1256247	Tower Works, the Giotto Tower Dust Extraction Chimney
Tyersal Hall	Bradford, Leeds	House	Late 16th century	25 May 1966	SE2004432223; 53°47′09″N 1°41′50″W	1135123	Tyersal Hall More images
University of Leeds School of Medicine	Thoresby Place, Leeds	Medical College	1894	22 March 1974	SE2954634053; 53°48′07″N 1°33′10″W	1255833	University of Leeds School of Medicine More images
Waterloo House, North East Range of White Cloth Hall with Assembly Rooms over	Leeds	Assembly Rooms	1777	5 August 1976	SE3045633370; 53°47′45″N 1°32′21″W	1375290	Waterloo House, North East Range of White Cloth Hall with Assembly Rooms over More images
Weetwood Hall	Weetwood, Leeds	House	1625	19 October 1951	SE2698638029; 53°50′16″N 1°35′29″W	1375330	Weetwood Hall More images
Whitelock's Ale House	Leeds	Pub	c.1700	29 September 1963	53°47′50″N 1°32′35″W	1255825	Whitelock's Ale House More images
99 Water Lane	Holbeck, Leeds	Garage	Late 19th century	7 July 1995	SE2964132901; 53°47′30″N 1°33′06″W	1255779	99 Water Lane More images
32–36 Commercial Street	Rothwell, Leeds	Manor House	Late 16th century or early 17th century	5 June 1964	SE3456728152; 53°44′55″N 1°28′38″W	1135680	32–36 Commercial Street
