= Dealtry =

Dealtry is a surname. Notable people with the surname include:

- Charles Dealtry Locock (1862–1946), British literary scholar, editor and translator
- Thomas Dealtry (1795–1861), Anglican Bishop
- Thomas Dealtry (1825–1882), Anglican archdeacon
- William Dealtry (1775–1847), English clergyman
