= Listed buildings in Walton, Leeds =

Walton is a civil parish in the metropolitan borough of the City of Leeds, West Yorkshire, England. The parish contains five listed buildings that are recorded in the National Heritage List for England. Of these, one is listed at Grade II*, the middle of the three grades, and the others are at Grade II, the lowest grade. The listed buildings consist of a church, its former vicarage, two houses, and a gun emplacement for the Second World War.

== Key ==
Grade	Criteria
II*	Particularly important buildings of more than special interest
II	Buildings of national importance and special interest

== Buildings ==
Name and location	Photograph	Date	Notes	Grade
St Peter's Church; 53.92465°N 1.32978°W		12th century	The oldest parts of the church are in the tower, the body of the church dates from about 1340–50, and the church was restored in 1890–91. It is built in magnesian limestone, with green slate roofs, and consists of a nave with a south porch, a narrower chancel with a north vestry, and a west tower. The tower is unbuttressed, it contains a clock face on the south side, and has a corbel table, a cornice, and an embattled parapet with corner crocketed pinnacles. The tower arch is Norman in style, and the east window has five lights.	II*
Croft Holdings; 53.92411°N 1.32753°W	—	Early 17th century (probable)	A timber framed house encased in stone in the 18th century and later rendered, it has a pantile roof with corbelled kneelers. There are two storeys and three bays, and at the rear are two aisles and a wing. On the front is a 20th-century porch, and the windows are casements.	II
Walton Old Hall; 53.92354°N 1.32770°W	—	Early 18th century	A rebuilt manor house, later extended and altered, it is in magnesian limestone, with quoins and a stone slate roof. There are two storeys, and an L-shaped plan. On the front is a 20th-century porch, most of the windows are mullioned, and one is transomed with four lights.	II
The Old Vicarage; 53.92437°N 1.32894°W		1684	The vicarage, later a private house, incorporates earlier timber framing, it has been encased in magnesian limestone, it has a pantile roof, and has been much altered and extended. The roof has gables with chamfered copings and rounded kneelers. There are two storeys and an irregular plan, originally an L-plan, with wings added later. The doorway has moulded quoined jambs, a depressed ogee lintel, and a datestone under a stepped hood mould. The windows are a mix; some are mullioned, some are casements, and some are sliding sashes.	II
Gun emplacement 53.91454°N 1.30743°W	—	1940–41	The light anti-aircraft gun emplacement was built to defend the Thorp Arch Royal Ordnance Factory. It consists of a circular brick-walled building with a concrete roof about 5 metres (16 ft) in diameter. There is a central hole about 1.5 metres (4 ft 11 in) in diameter through which the steel mounting for the gun projects. On the west side is an open doorway protected by a brick blast wall.	II
