= Leeds Club =

Victorian building in Leeds, England

Coordinates: 53°47′53″N 1°32′40″W

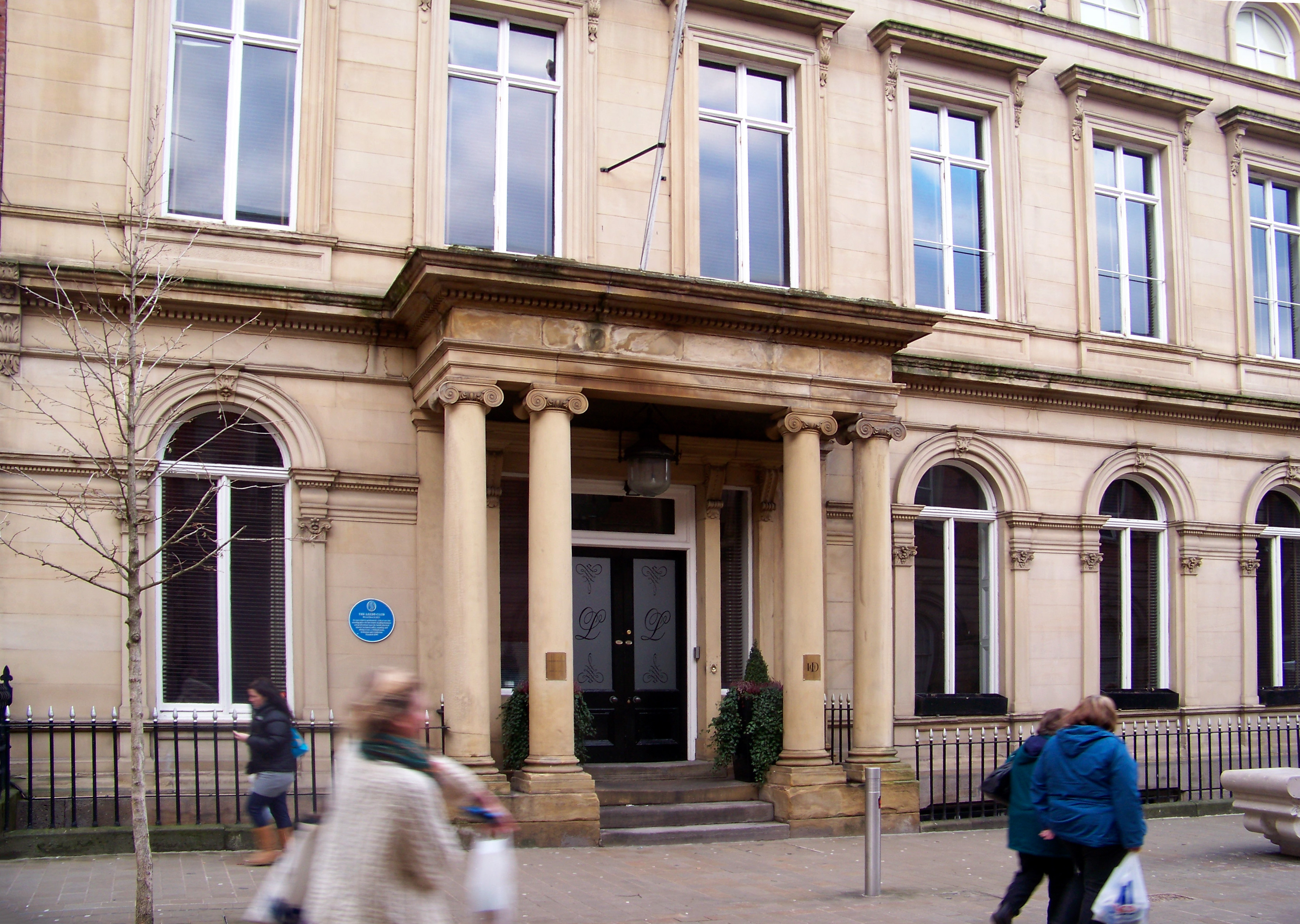
The Leeds Club premises

The Leeds Club is a Grade II* listed Victorian building in Leeds, West Yorkshire, England. It is situated on Albion Place in the city centre.

Built in 1820 as residences for the son and grandson of William Hey, a distinguished surgeon, the building was converted into the Leeds Club, a place where the city's leaders could meet, in 1849 and given a new facade. Renovations were completed in 2007, and the building is now used for conferences, weddings and Christmas parties.

The Historic England listing record describes the building as having "fine and very complete nineteenth century interior decoration" and draws attention to the "very fine" men's lavatory in the basement with "coloured marble sinks with completely original fittings".

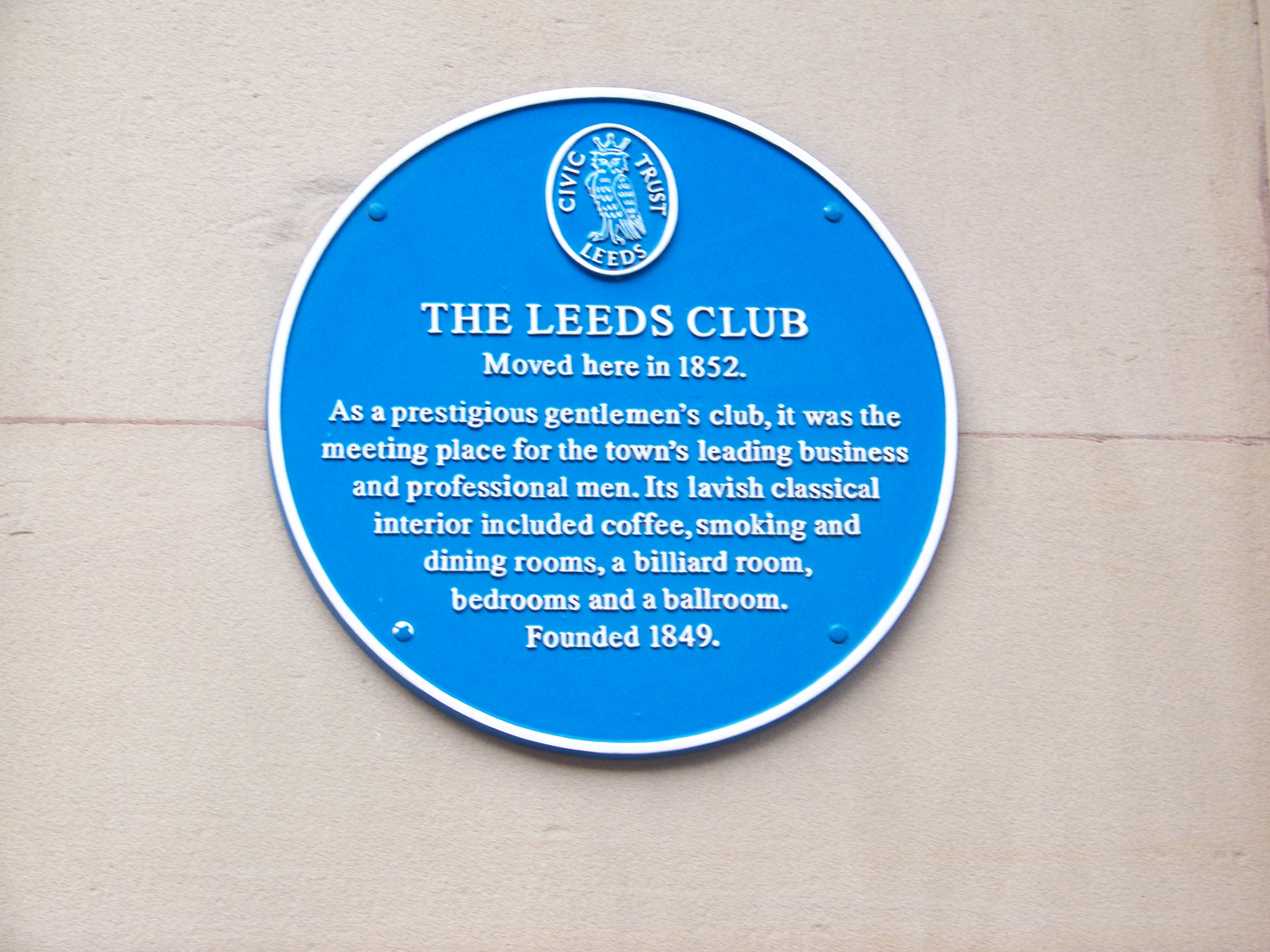
The Leeds Club - blue plaque

== See also ==
- Grade II* listed buildings in Leeds
- Listed buildings in Leeds (City and Hunslet Ward - northern area)
