= Memorial to Queen Victoria, Leeds =

Public sculpture by George Frampton

Memorial to Queen Victoria
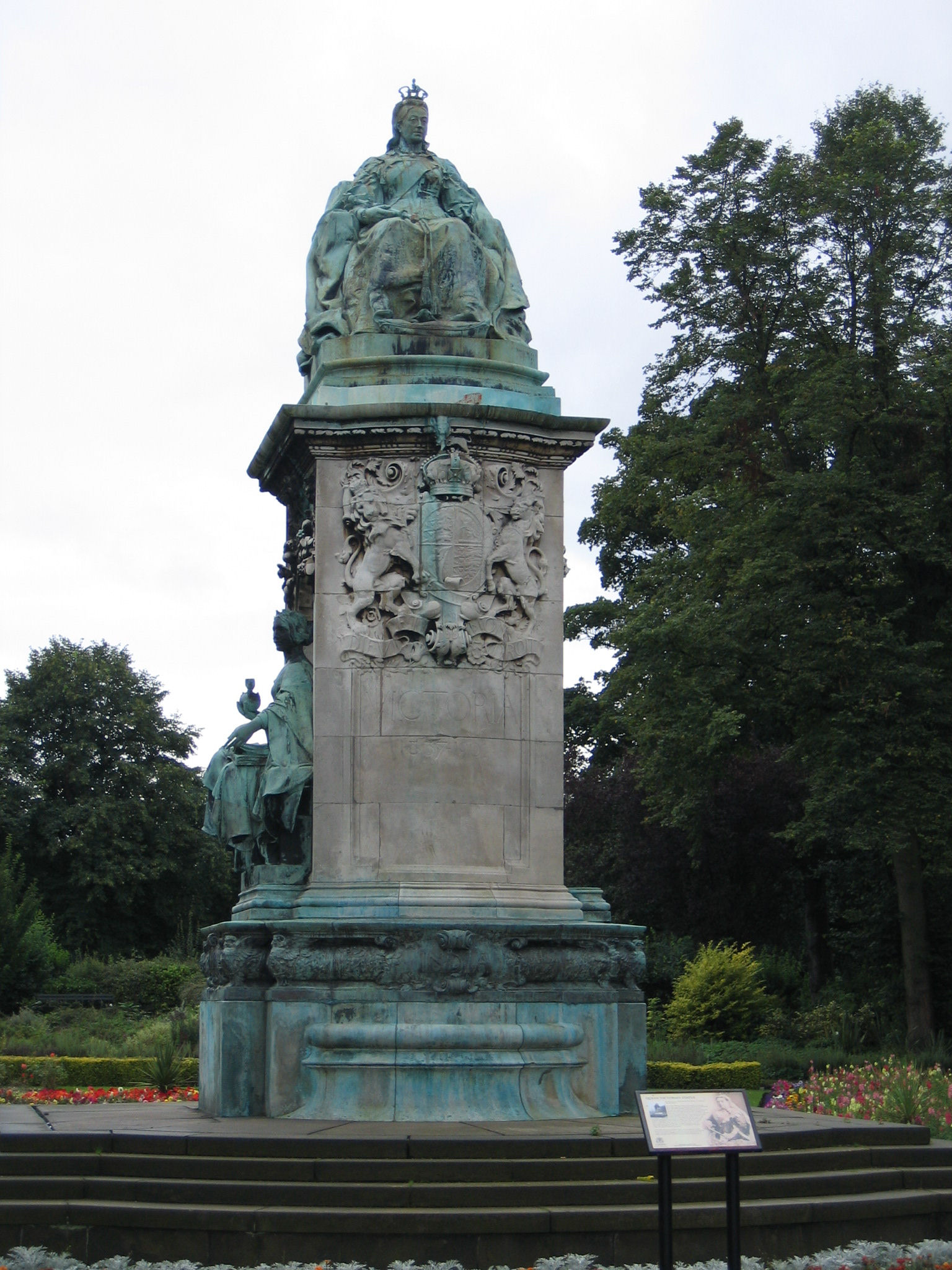
- Statue of Queen Victoria
- Interactive map of Memorial to Queen Victoria
- Location: Leeds
- Coordinates: 53.8111°N 1.5579°W
- Designer: George Frampton
- Type: Memorial
- Material: Bronze
- Opening date: 27 November 1905
- Dedicated to: Queen Victoria

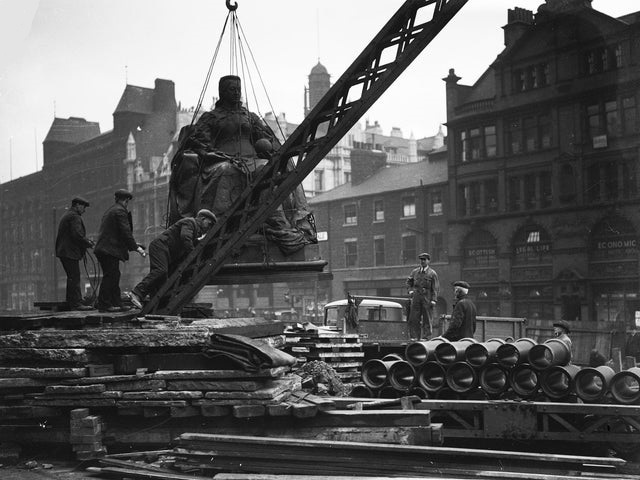
The Queen Victoria Statue being uprooted from Victoria Square in the city centre where it had stood for over 30 years. It was transported by lorry to a new site on Woodhouse Moor.

A Memorial to Queen Victoria stands in Woodhouse Moor, Leeds, West Yorkshire, England.

The memorial consists of figures and a frieze in bronze on a plinth and pedestal of Portland stone. The sculptor was George Frampton, and the architect working with him was Leonard Stokes. The figure on the top of the pedestal is that of Queen Victoria sitting on a throne, with a sceptre resting on her right forearm, and holding an orb in her left hand. (Note: Frampton used the same model of the seated queen in two other statues, the Statue of Queen Victoria, in St Helens, Merseyside, and for the Queen Victoria Statue, in Winnipeg, Manitoba, Canada.) The back of the throne has the appearance of a radiant Sun. On the sides of the pedestal are figures in niches, that on the left representing Peace, and that on the right representing Industry. On the front of the plinth are carved the Royal Arms, and on the back is the coat of arms of Leeds and an inscription. Beneath the pedestal is a plinth with a continuous frieze incorporating the words "INDIA", "AUSTRALIA", "CANADA", and "AFRICA" on scrolled plaques that are flanked by owls and foliage. The plinth stands on four steps.

The memorial was unveiled on 27 November 1905, and originally stood outside Leeds Town Hall. It was moved to Woodhouse Moor in 1937. The memorial was designated as a Grade II* listed building on 5 August 1976. (Note: Grade II* is the middle of the three grades of listing designated by English Heritage, and is granted to "particularly important buildings of more than special interest".)

During the wave of George Floyd protests in the United Kingdom, it was reported on 9 June 2020 that the statue had been vandalized by painting with slogans such as 'racist', 'colonizer', 'justice', "BLM" (Black Lives Matter) and 'slave owner' (although slave ownership in the British Empire had been abolished in 1833, four years before she ascended the throne).

== See also ==
- Grade II* listed buildings in Leeds
- Listed buildings in Leeds (Hyde Park and Woodhouse)

== Notes and references ==
Notes

Citations

Sources

- Morris, Edward; Roberts, Emma (2012), Public Sculpture of Cheshire and Merseyside (excluding Liverpool), Public Sculpture of Britain, vol. 15, Liverpool: Liverpool University Press, ISBN 978-1-84631-492-6
- Historic England, "Memorial to Queen Victoria, Leeds (1255642)", National Heritage List for England
- Historic England, Listed Buildings
