= St Aidan's Church, Leeds =

Church of England Church in Leeds, West Yorkshire, England

St Aidan's Church
- Church of St Aidan (Bishop Woodford Memorial)
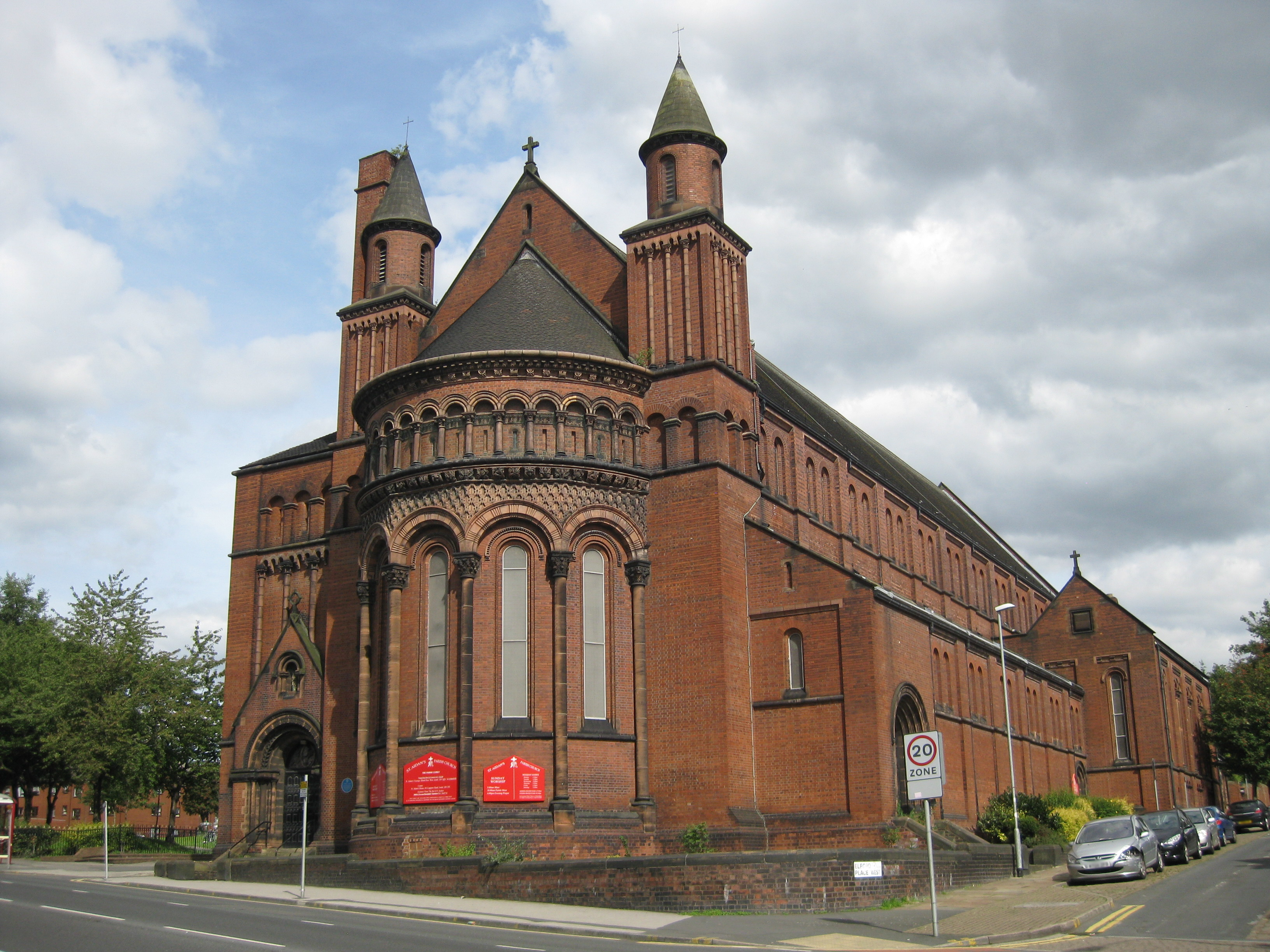
- St Aidan's Church
- 53.8126°N 1.5207°W
- OS grid reference: SE 3166 3525
- Location: Leeds
- Country: England
- Denomination: Church of England
- Churchmanship: Liberal Catholic
- Website: www.staidan-leeds.org.uk

History
- Founded: 1894

Specifications
- Capacity: 800

Administration
- Province: York
- Diocese: Leeds
- Archdeaconry: Leeds
- Deanery: Allerton
- Parish: Leeds Saint Aidan

Clergy
- Priest(s): The Revd Diana Zanker; The Revd Paul Hunt

St Aidan's Church in Harehills, Leeds, West Yorkshire is a Church of England parish church built in 1894. It is a large Victorian basilica-type red-brick building which is Grade II* listed. A church hall is adjacent. The architects were Johnson and Crawford Hick of Newcastle.

== History ==
The church was consecrated by John Pulleine, Bishop of Richmond, on 13 October 1894. The first vicar was Samuel Mumford Taylor, who later became Bishop of Kingston-upon-Thames. His pastoral staff and mitres were bequeathed to the church.

The apse is decorated with 1,000 square feet (93 m^{2}) of mosaics by Frank Brangwyn, which were completed in 1916. They show scenes from St Aidan's life: feeding the poor, in Northumbria, preaching and the death of the saint. They are said to be best viewed at noon on a sunny winter's day, when they are lit by the nave windows. Brangwyn was initially commissioned to decorate the church by painting, and began this in 1910. However, he was concerned that the smoky atmosphere of Harehills would destroy it, so started again with a mosaic. On the south wall, behind the altar, is the scene of St Aidan preaching. The artist's initials, F. B., are subtly given in a pattern of stars.

The organ, dating from 1896, is by James Jepson Binns and is in unusual in being unmodified from its original condition.

== Present day ==
The church is unusual among Anglican parish churches in celebrating the Mass daily. It was previously in the Diocese of Ripon and Leeds, whose cathedral is at Ripon. However the church became part of the Diocese of Leeds in 2014.

From January 2012 until 2017, the parish was united with Leeds All Souls.

== Gallery ==
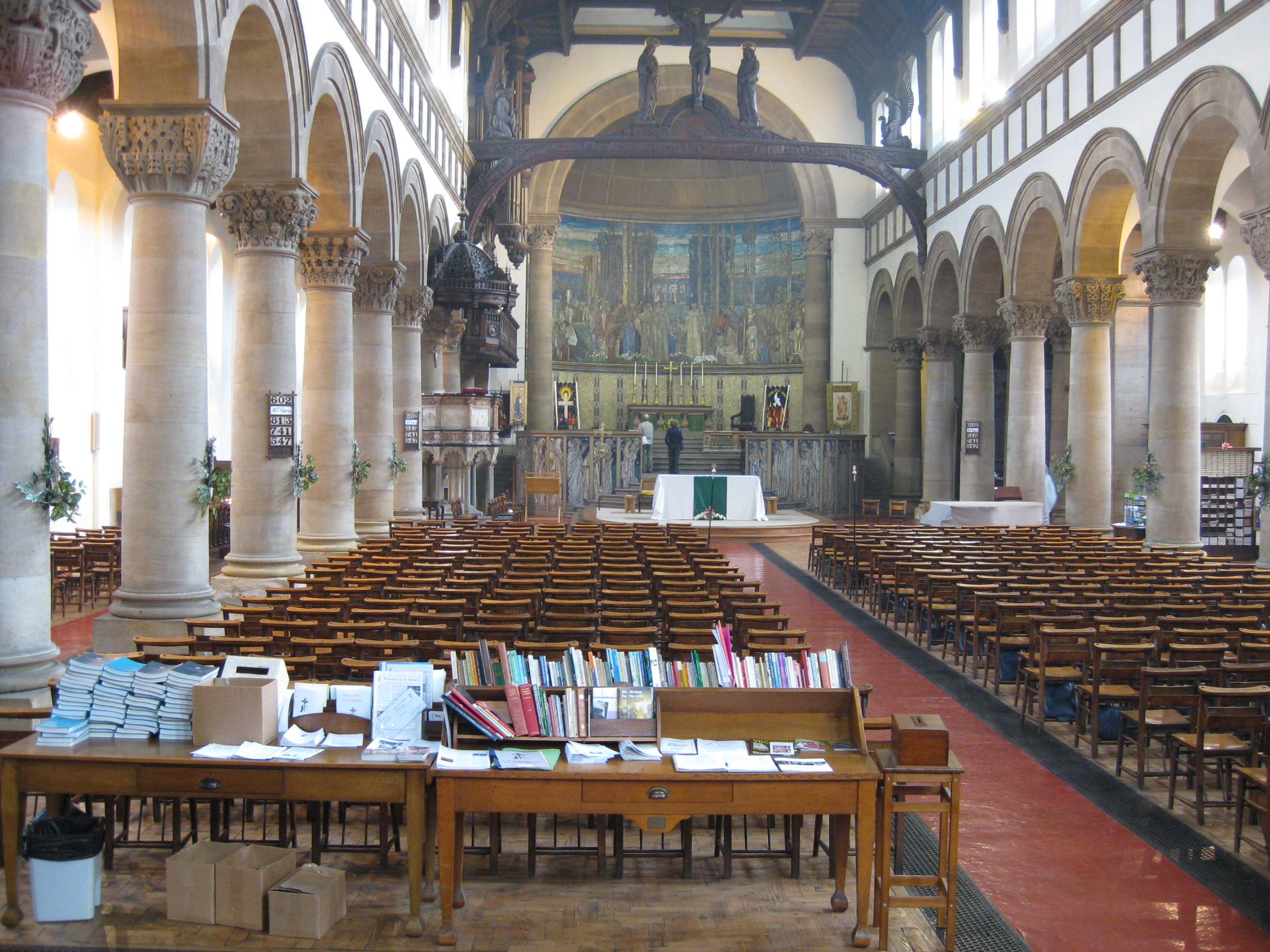
Church Interior

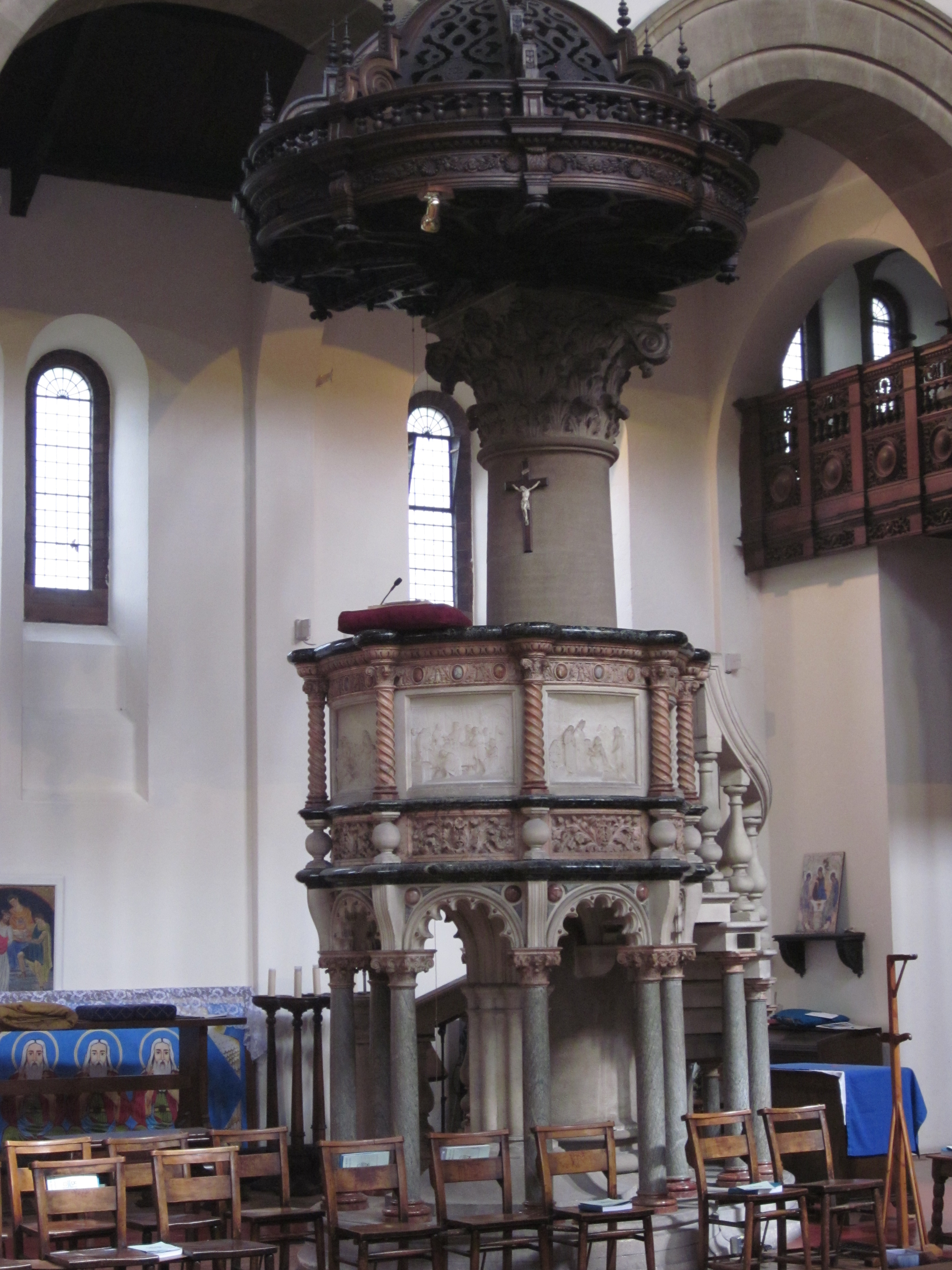
Pulpit

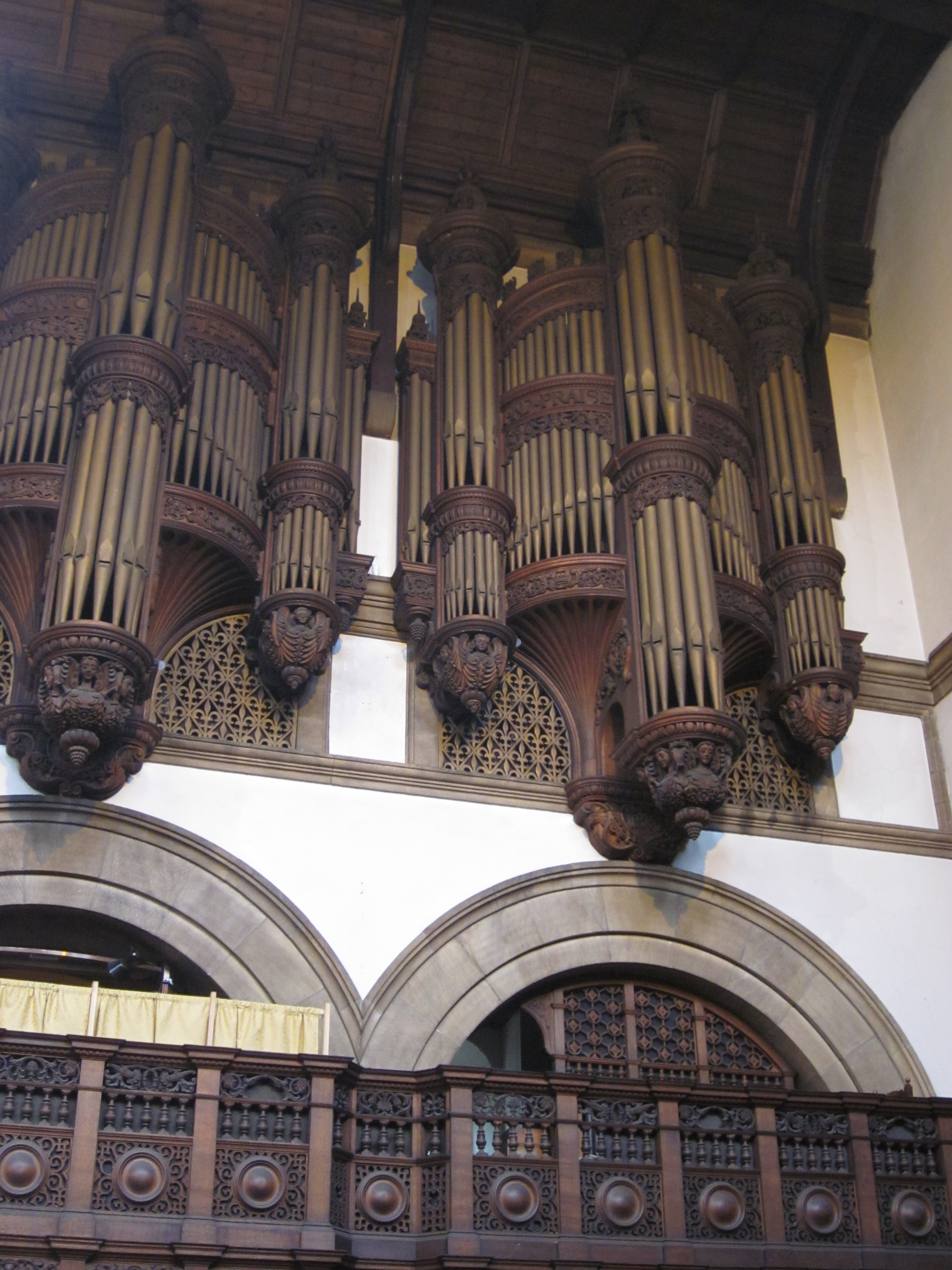
Organ

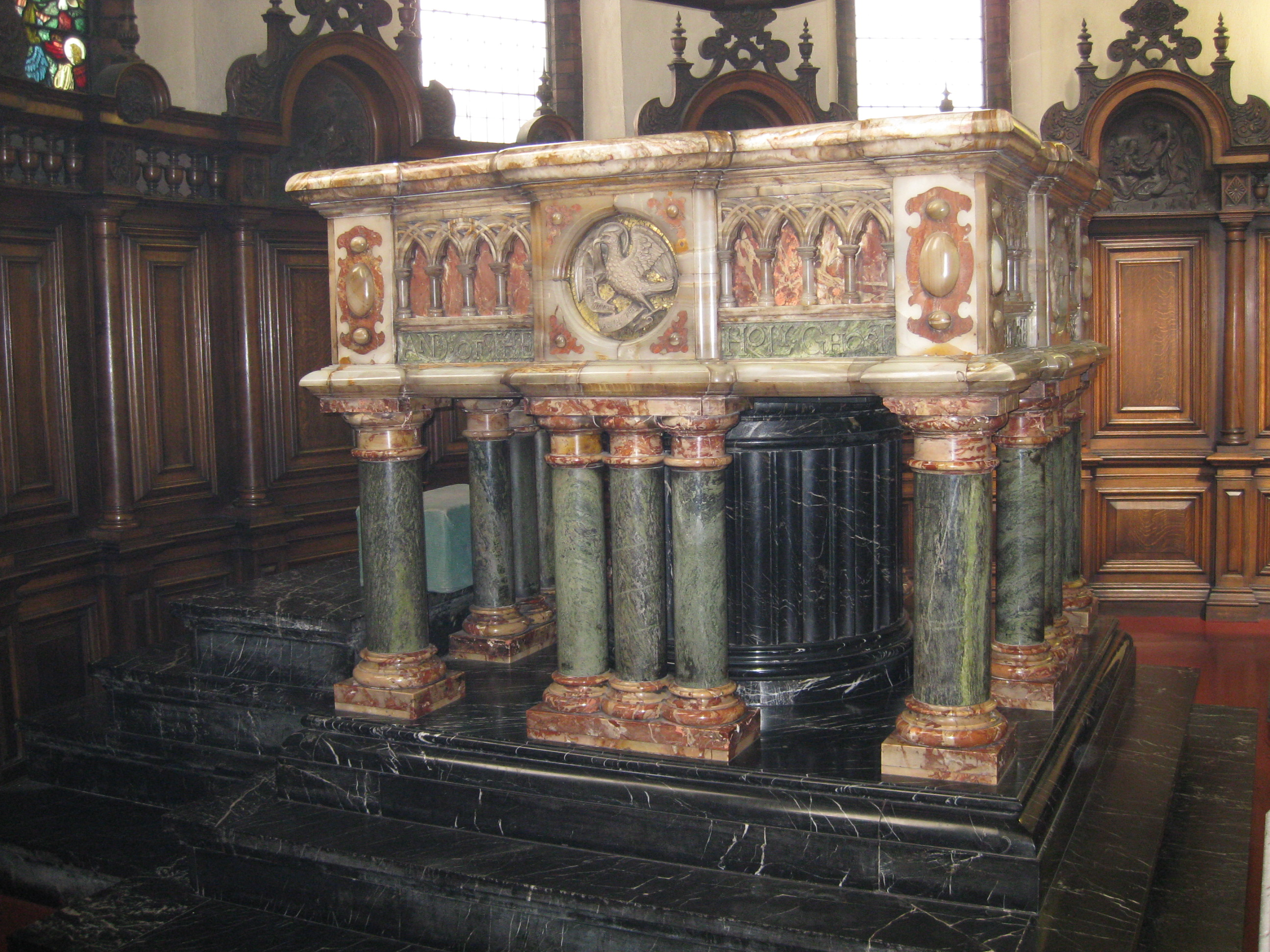
Font

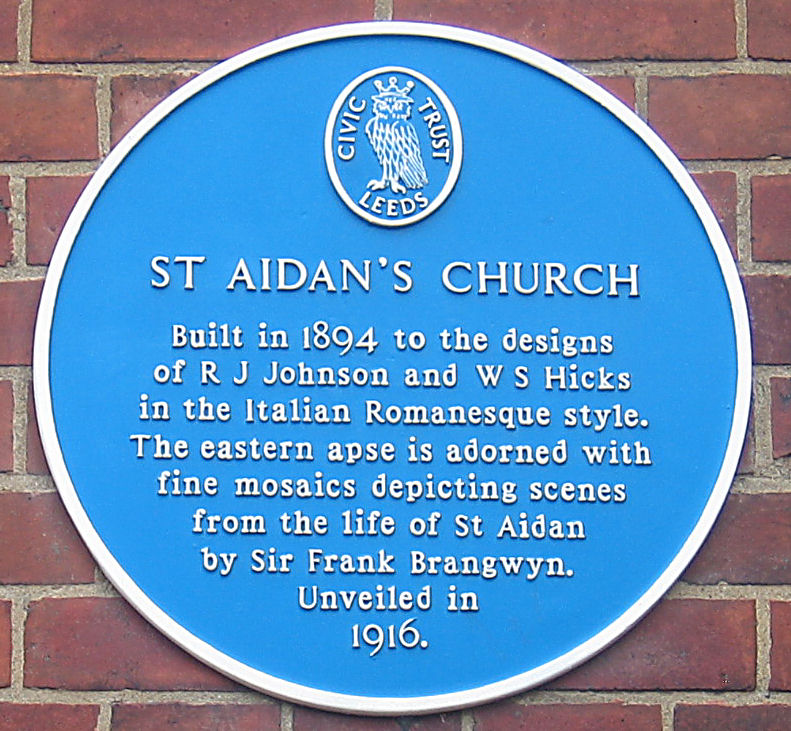
Blue Plaque near main door

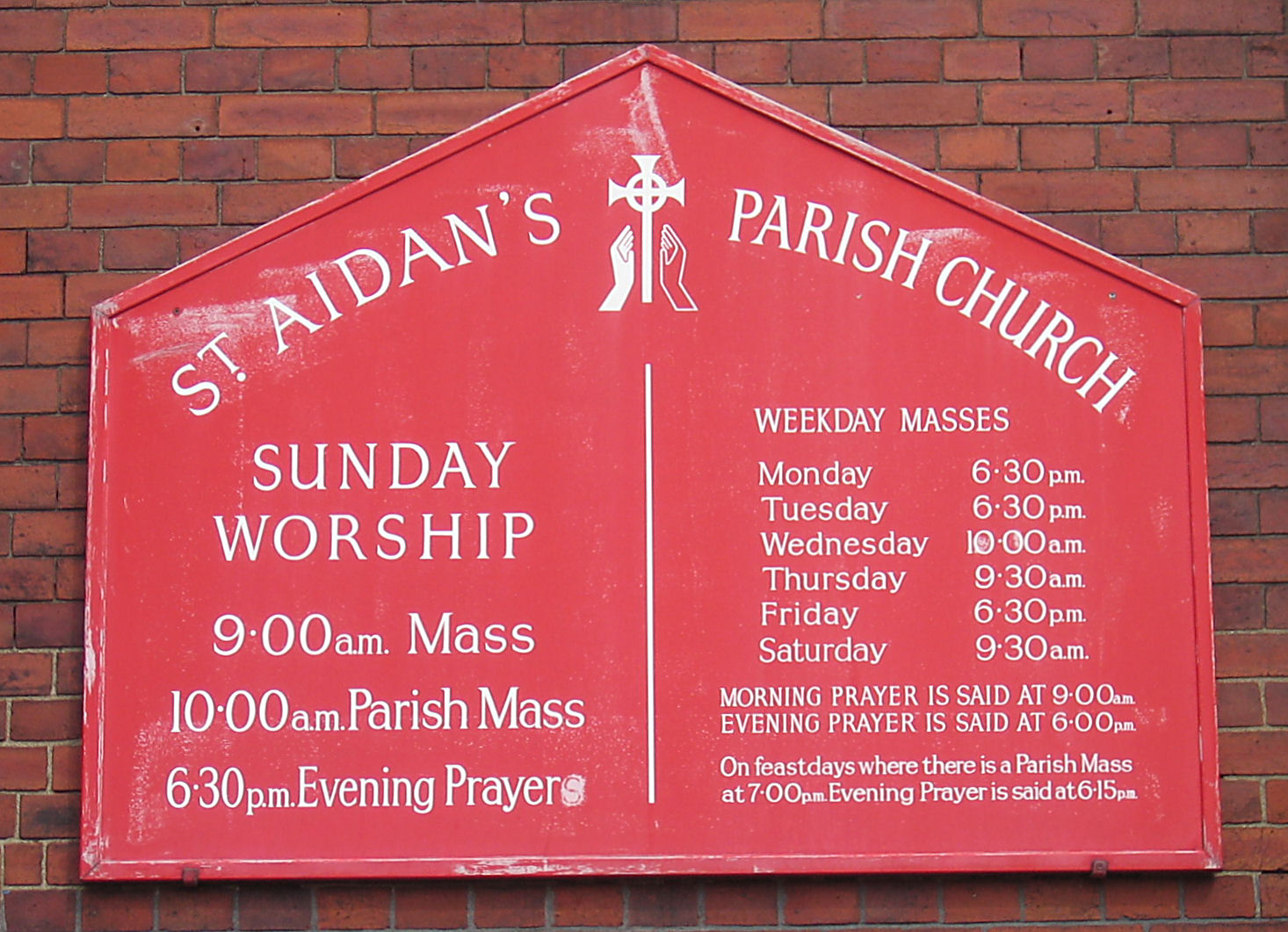
Sign giving times of worship

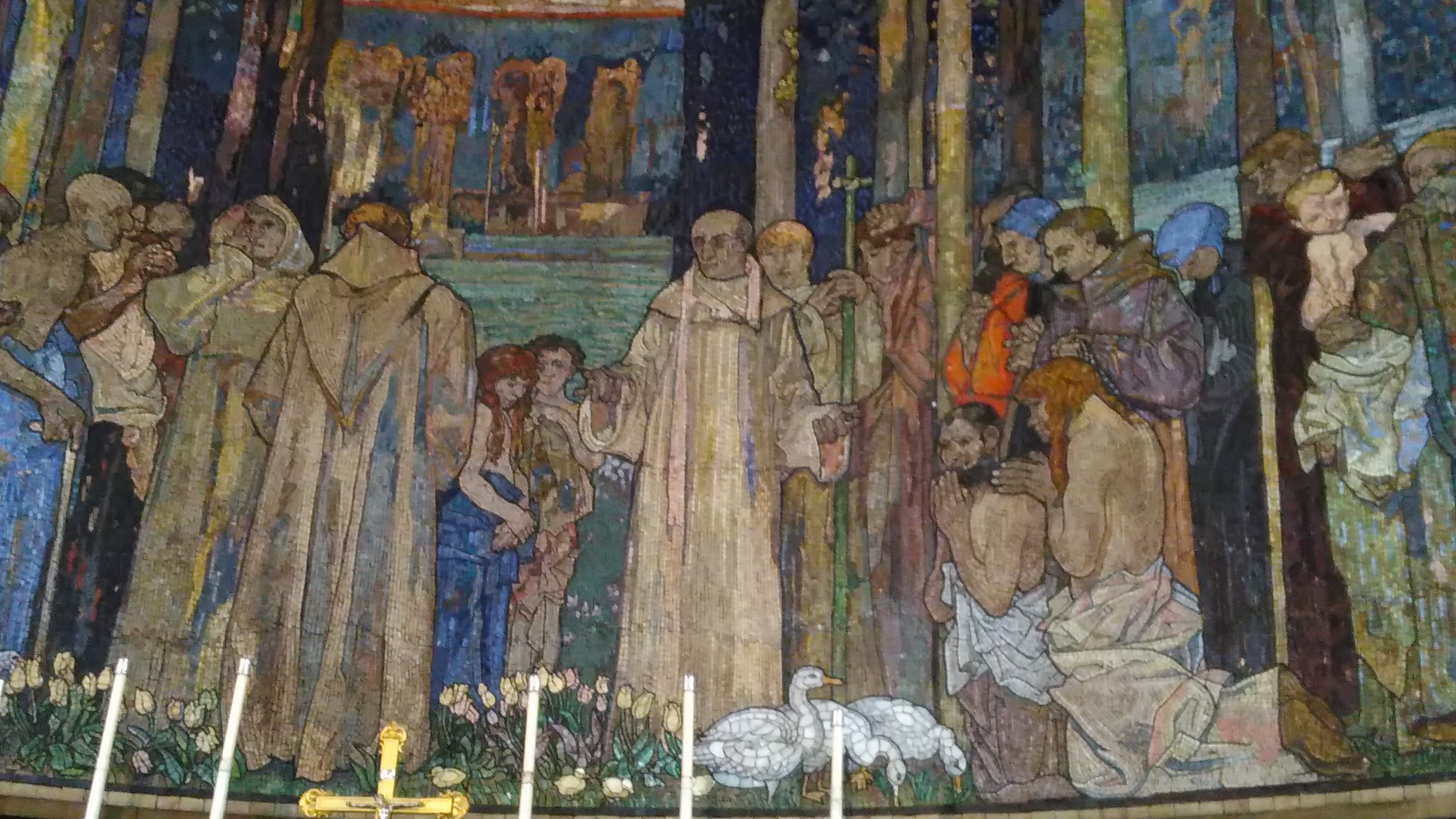
Detail of mosaic

== See also ==
- Grade II* listed buildings in Leeds
- Listed buildings in Leeds (Gipton and Harehills Ward)
