= Thomas Dealtry (son) =

Archdeacon of Madras (1861–1871)

Thomas Dealtry (1825–1882) was an Anglican archdeacon in India in the mid-19th century. Dealtry was the son of Thomas Dealtry, bishop of Madras. He was educated at Trinity College, Cambridge and ordained in 1849. After curacies in Raydon and Brenchley he went as a chaplain to the East India Company in Madras, where he was archdeacon from 1861 to 1871. Returning to England he held incumbencies in Swillington and Maidstone. He is credited with being the originator of the custom of throwing rice at a newly married couple, which he had seen in India. He died on 29 November 1882.
