= Time Ball Buildings, Leeds =

Building in Leeds, West Yorkshire, England

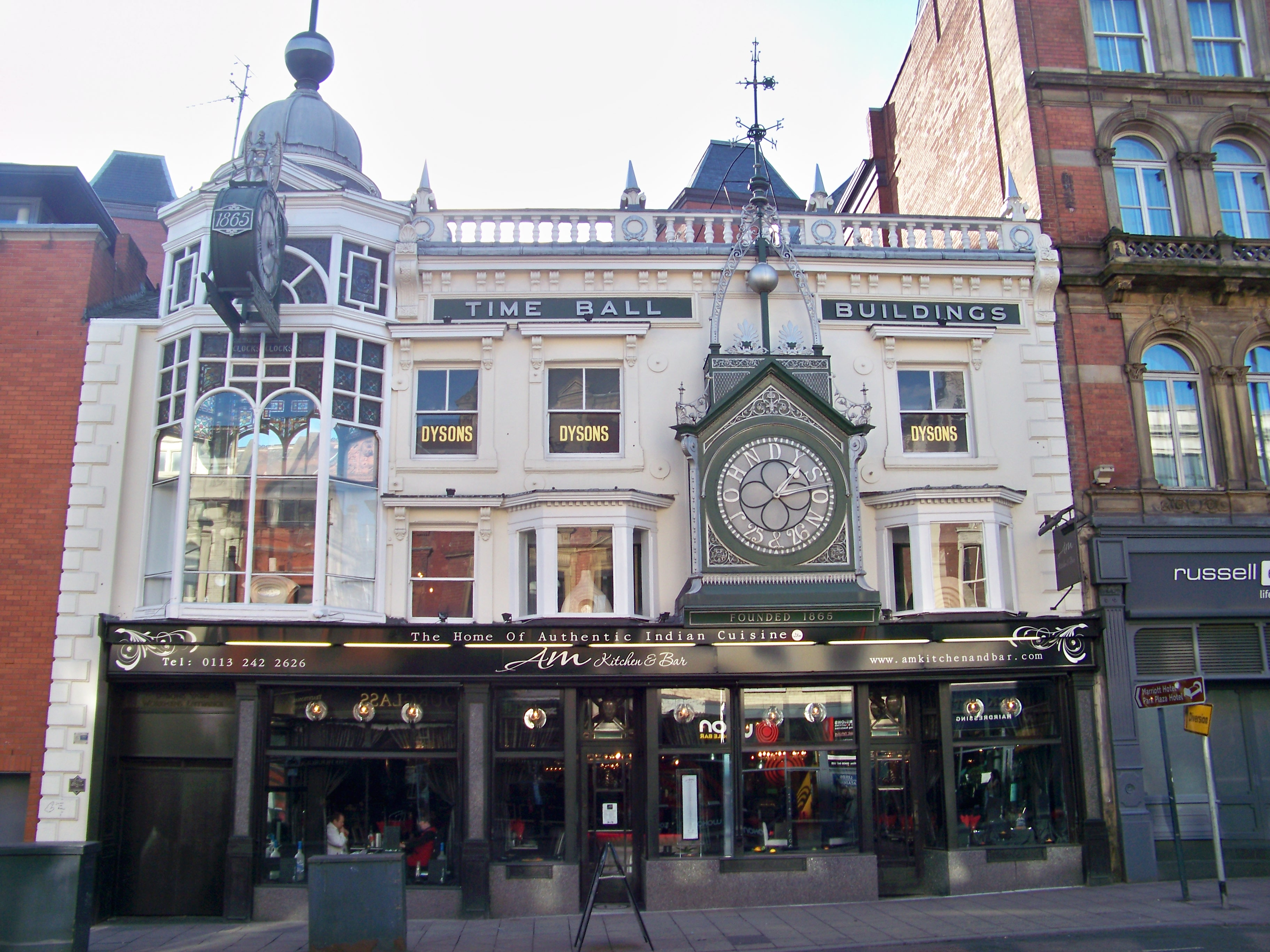
- Interactive map of the Time Ball Buildings, Leeds area

General information
- Location: 24, 25 and 26, Briggate, Leeds, Leeds
- Coordinates: 53°47′43.79″N 1°32′33.77″W

Design and construction
- Designations: Grade II* listed

Time Ball Buildings, Leeds is a Grade II* listed building in Briggate, Leeds, England.

== History ==
The building dates from the early 19th century and was used by a variety of businesses, acting as a distillery, saddlery, barber and perfumier and stationer. By 1869 the premises were uninhabited. By 1870 a watchmaker by the name of John Dyson occupied No. 26. By 1882 he occupied No.s 24 and 25 as well.

The elaborately decorated front dates over numbers 25 and 26 dates from 1872 and over 26 from 1900. The distinctive features of the building are the gilded time ball, and the cantilevered clock, surmounted by a figure of Father Time carved by John Wormald Appleyard. A second clock by Potts of Leeds was installed in 1910.

Perhaps inspired by the model of the time ball at Greenwich installed in 1875 by Potts of Leeds in their shop window in Guildford Street the gilded time ball mechanism was installed in 1877. It had a connection to the time equipment at Greenwich and the time ball dropped at exactly 1 pm each day.

The building was restored in 1993.
