= St Mary's Church, Swillington =

Church in Swillington, West Yorkshire, England

Coordinates: 53.7692°N 1.4174°W

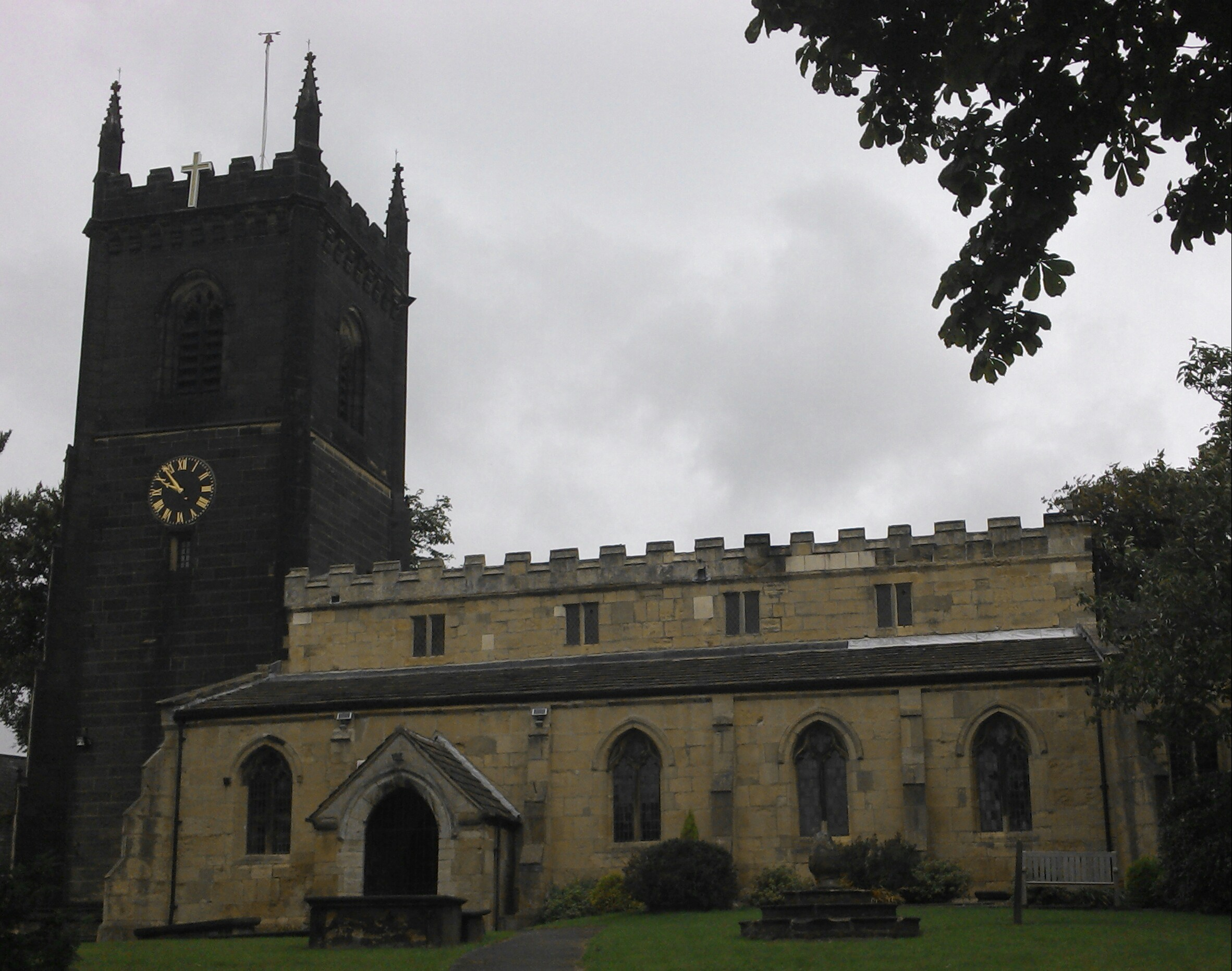
St Mary's Church, Swillington

St Mary's Church is located on Church Lane next to Swillington Primary School, on Wakefield Road, Swillington, West Yorkshire, England.

There has been a church at this location for at least 900 years. The Domesday Book of 1086 notes that 'a church is there' but no other records of that building remain. The church on the site today is a Grade II* listed building, over 600 years old, built around 1360. The tower was renovated in 1883–1884 with Harehills Stone, which has now weathered almost black, in stark contrast to the creamy yellow of the rest of the exterior. Thomas Dealtry, rector of Swillington 1872–1878, is credited with having introduced the habit of throwing confetti at weddings, from his observation of rice thrown at Hindu weddings in his previous position as Archdeacon of Madras. His predecessor, the Rev A. F. A. Woodford, rector 1847–1872, was a noted masonic scholar and publisher, and became Grand Chaplain in 1863. He is credited, in 1886, with passing to William Wynn Westcott the Cipher Manuscripts leading to the formation of the Hermetic order of the Golden Dawn.
