= Stank Hall =

Building in Leeds, West Yorkshire, England

Coordinates: 53°45′27″N 1°34′08″W

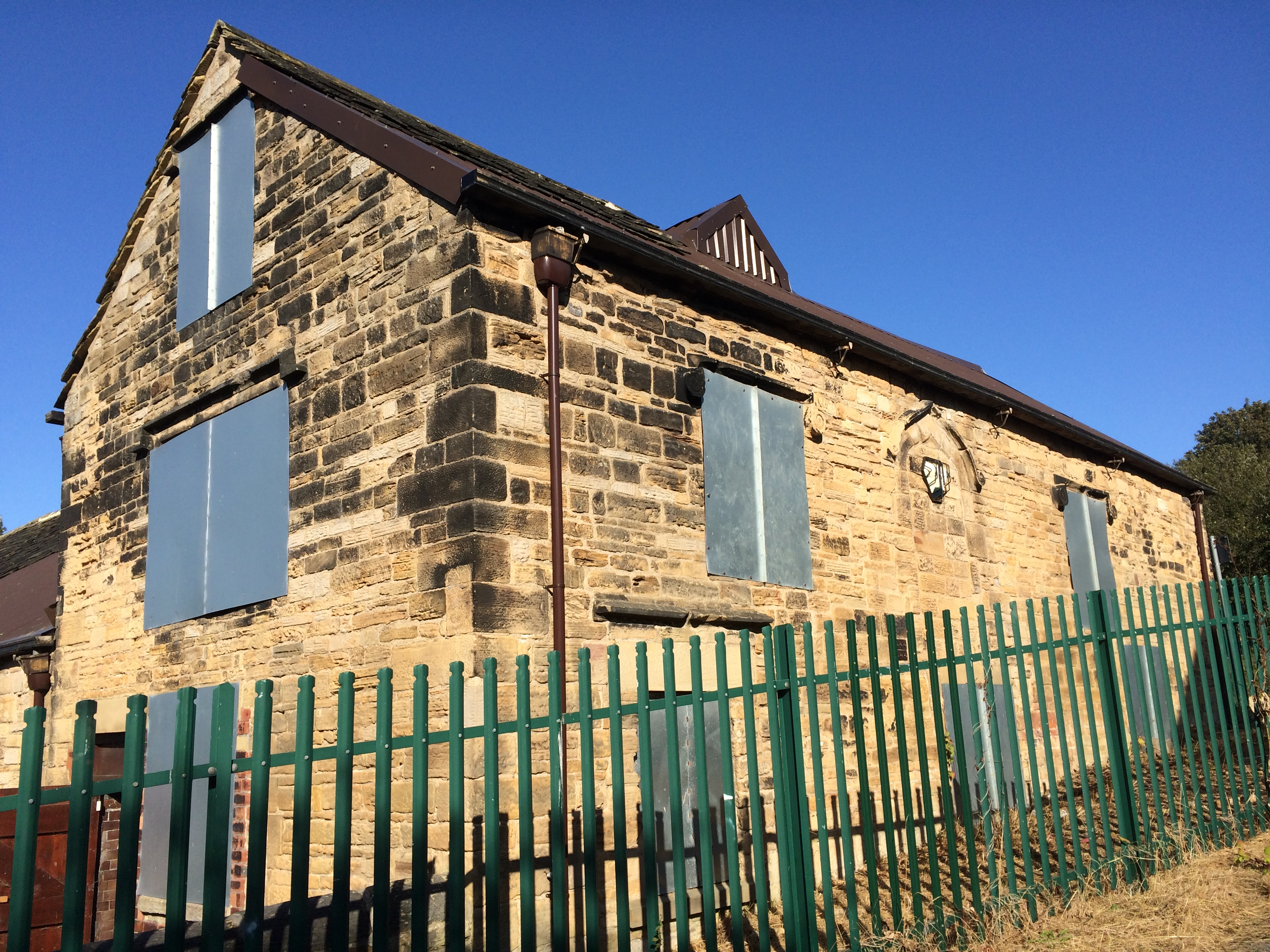
Exterior of Stank Hall Barn

The Stank Hall complex is a grouping of historic buildings in Beeston, a suburb of Leeds in England comprising the thirteenth century Stank Old Hall, which is built on the footings of an earlier structure, the fifteenth century barn and the sixteenth century Stank New Hall, the New Hall was damaged by arson and then demolished by Leeds City Council in 2018, despite attempts to save the building by local group Friends of Stank Hall. Today only Stank Old Hall and Stank Hall Barn remain. Stank Old Hall was originally built as a Royal hunting lodge attached to nearby Rothwell Castle, and still contains remnants of its earlier structure including a rare garderobe. It has been listed as Grade II by English Heritage since 19 October 1951. Immediately to the north stands a Grade II*–listed barn of the late 15th century that was built for the Beeston family who acquired the site when it passed out of Royal ownership and into a second life as a hall and farm, and was subsequently acquired by the Hodgson family in the 17th century. From that point on the site became a farm of known antiquity and was heavily damaged in the Beeston Mining Disaster of 1874 in which nine local minters were killed in an explosion underground, some of the mining works running directly under the Stank Hall site. This caused damage to the buildings, including the loss of the end of the wing that had connected Stank Old Hall to Stank New Hall, damage to the structure of Stank Hall Barn and the complete loss of a wide wing which fronted the approach to the complex from where the railway bridge now stands. The damage did reveal a number of carved items of antiquity which had previously been hidden on the buildings, and there were offered for sale through the local newspapers. During demolition work to the back of the site in the 20th century to build the bypass an icehouse was uncovered and demolished and a number of early carved faces were recovered by the work crew, although the whereabouts of these are unknown. During recent works excavation to the front of the barn the footings of an earlier medieval hall with large pillar bases to support a heavy roof was found which crossed immediately under the floor of the barn. Major Greathead's Chapel, used as a courthouse for Courts Leet, which was built up against the end of the barn adjoining the public footpath in the 17th century, contains structural elements believed to come from an early chapel which stood onsite, including the doorway from the end of the barn into the ground floor of the chapel which is created with elements of two early medieval carved doorways. The buildings passed through the hands of the local mining company in the 19th century and then into the ownership of Leeds City Council, who removed the last residential tenants from the buildings in the late 20th century. The Stank Hall site is reputed to be haunted by a number of ghosts, including a bald headed man in late seventeenth century clothes, a large black dog that runs in the field to the back of the barn and a small man with spiky red hair and a tartan bomber jacket from the 1970s who walks up onto the site whistling but always disappears from view halfway up the path.] In 2014, the Stank Hall Site was rented from the Leeds City Council by the Friends of Stank Hall Barn, who created a free food grow scheme and archaeological and local history programme with the intent of restoring the site to local use. Unfortunately the Friends of Stank Hall lost access to the site during Covid Lockdown and the site has reverted to the care of Leeds City Council, currently standing derelict. <https://southleedslife.com/brief-history-stank-hall-site-beeston/><https://southleedslife.com/mining-in-beeston-village/>
