= St John the Evangelist's Church, Oulton =

Coordinates: 53°44′52.8″N 1°27′21.1″W

St John the Evangelist
- Church of Saint John the Evangelist
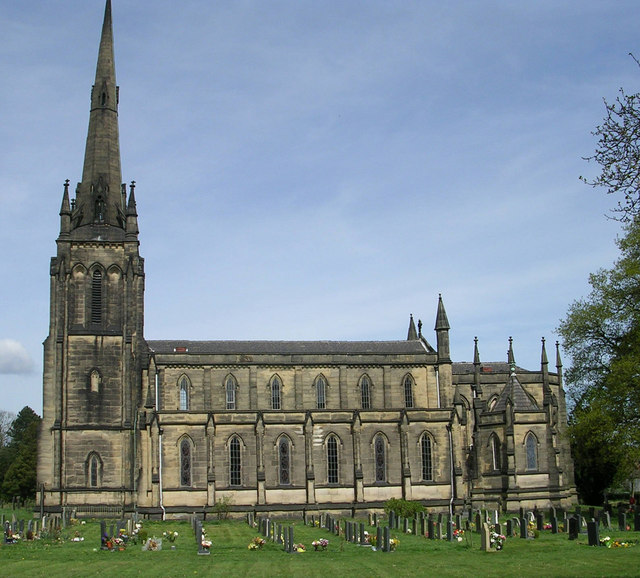
- St John the Evangelist
- OS grid reference: SE 35972 28095
- Location: Oulton, West Yorkshire
- Country: England
- Denomination: Church of England

History
- Status: Parish Church

Architecture
- Heritage designation: Grade II* listed building
- Groundbreaking: 1827
- Completed: 1829

Specifications
- Materials: Sandstone ashlar with slate roof

Administration
- Province: York
- Diocese: Leeds
- Archdeaconry: Leeds
- Parish: Oulton and Woodlesford

St John the Evangelist's Church, Oulton, West Yorkshire, England is an active Anglican parish church in the archdeaconry of Leeds and the Diocese of Leeds.

== History ==
The church was built between 1827 and 1829 by Rickman and Hutchinson. In 1898, the church was in the Diocese of Ripon in the Whitkirk Deanery. The Vicar of Oulton at this time was the Rev A.E. Green Price. The church was grade II* listed on 5 June 1964.

== Architectural style ==
=== Exterior ===
Built between 1827 and 1829, the church is built in the Early English style in sandstone ashlar with a slate roof. The church has a west three-stage tower with an octagonal spire and flying buttresses. The nave and porch are to the north while the hexagonal vestry is to the south.

=== Interior ===
The church has two-centred arches with three orders of moulding. The ceiling is groin-vaulted with carved bosses. The organ is at the west end. A wall monument commemorates the church's founder, John Blayds, who died during the year that ground was broken for the church construction.

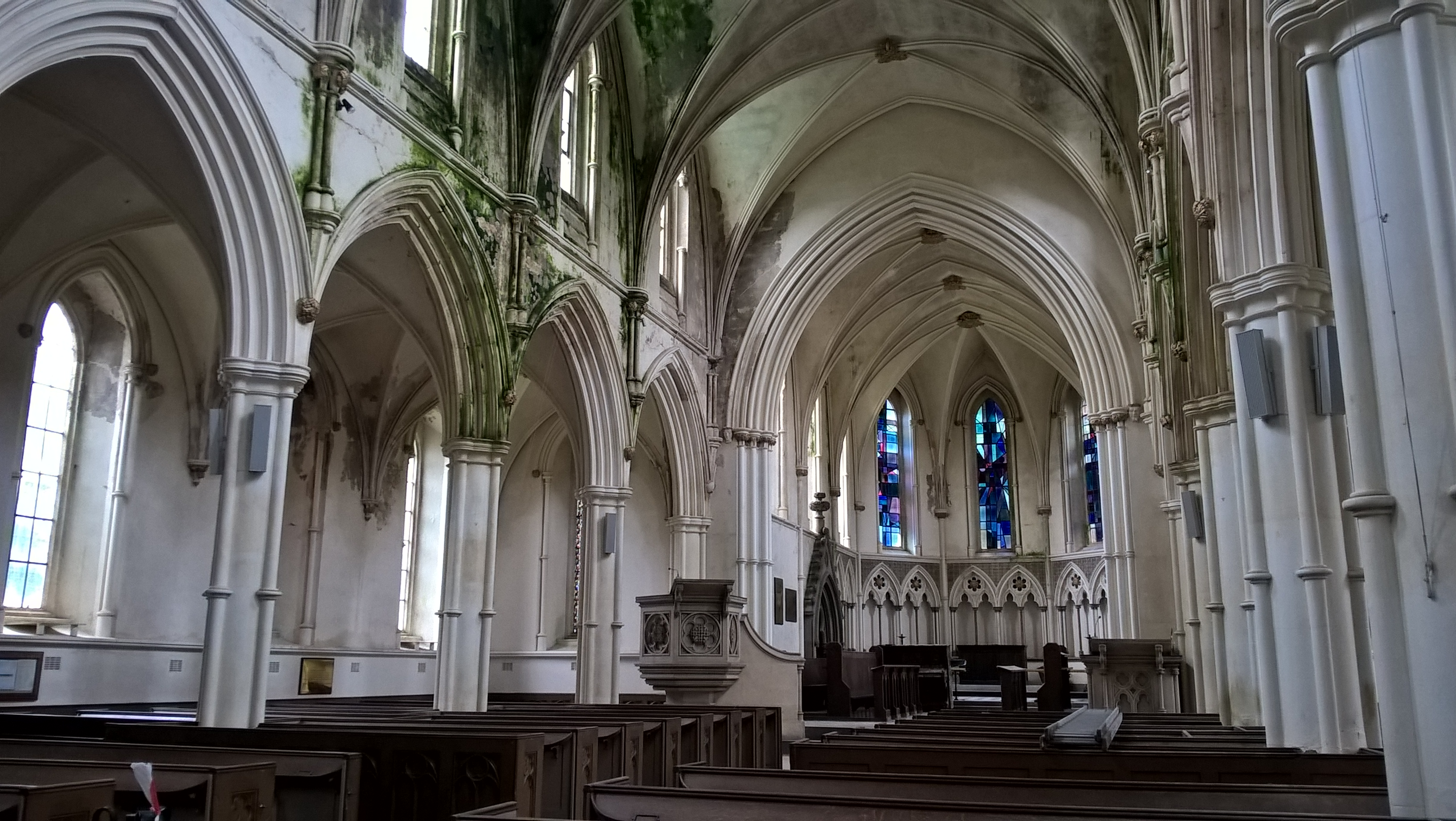
Interior showing green from water damage

== Water damage ==
In November 2014, a large quantity of lead was stolen from the roof resulting in flooding that caused considerable damage and put the church out of use. However, funding is being sought to repair the damage.

== See also ==
- List of places of worship in the City of Leeds
