= Victoria Riverside (Leeds) =

Mill buildings in Leeds, England

Coordinates: 53°47′05″N 1°31′25″W

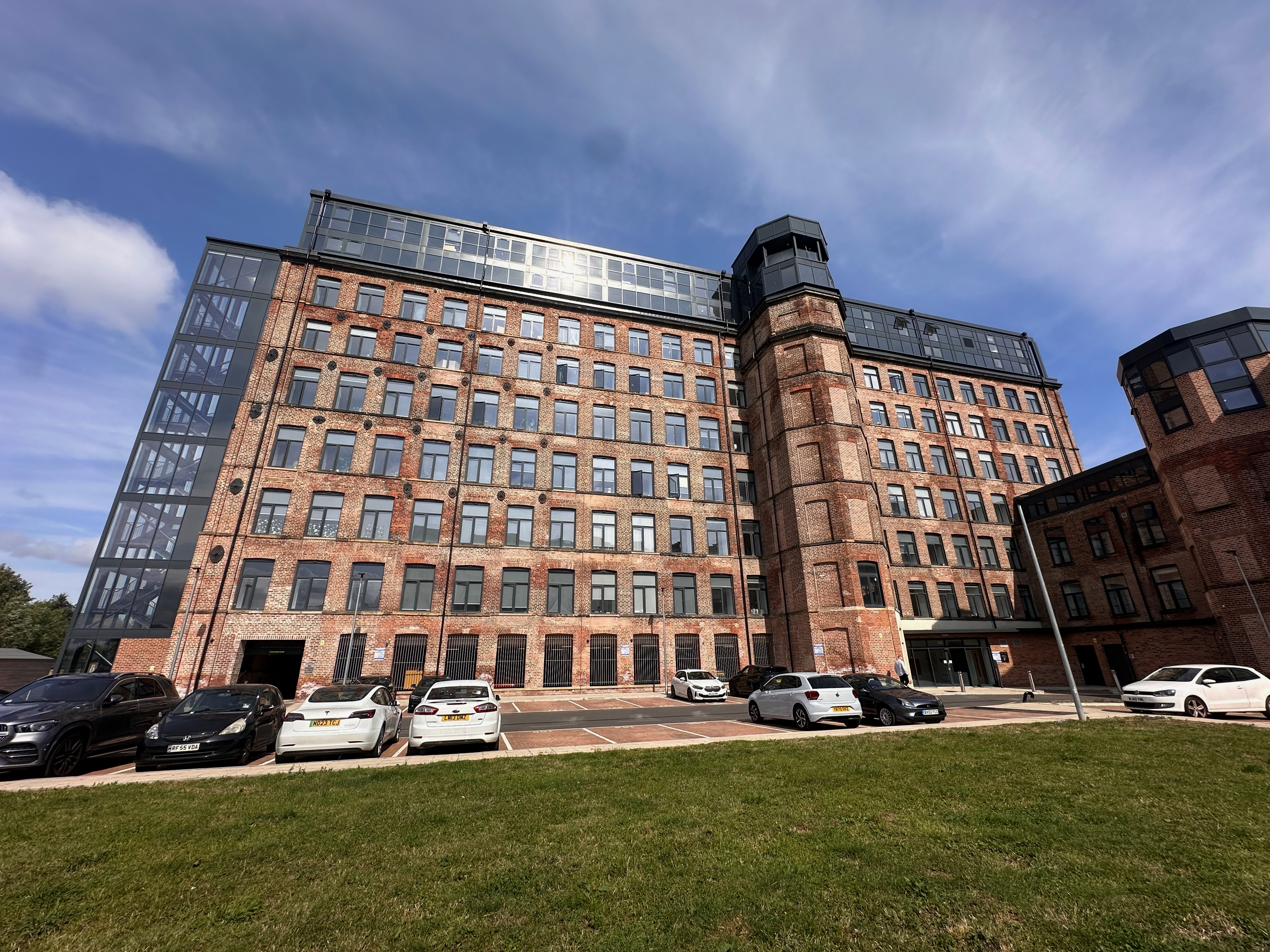
- Hunslet Mill (in the centre) and Victoria Works (on the right)

- Location within West Yorkshire
- Former names: Hunslet Mill and Victoria Works Complex

General information
- Location: Goodman St, Leeds, England
- Completed: 1842
- Renovated: 2017–2023

Technical details
- Material: Brick
- Floor count: 7

Renovating team
- Main contractor: JM Construction

Other information
- Number of units: 356

Listed Building – Grade II*
- Official name: Hunslet Mill
- Designated: 10 January 1986
- Reference no.: 1256253

Listed Building – Grade II
- Official name: Victoria Flax Mill entrance range and bollards
- Designated: 5 August 1976
- Reference no.: 1256342

Listed Building – Grade II
- Official name: Victoria Works Range
- Designated: 10 January 1986
- Reference no.: 1256251

Listed Building – Grade II
- Official name: Former drying house part of Victoria Flax Mill complex
- Designated: 1 November 1995
- Reference no.: 1256355

Listed Building – Grade II
- Official name: Mill Range attached to west side of Number 21A
- Designated: 21 November 1995
- Reference no.: 1256252

Victoria Riverside (formerly known as the Hunslet Mill and Victoria Works Complex) is a series of very large previously disused mill buildings regenerated into apartment buildings on Goodman Street in Leeds, England. The regeneration, carried out between 2017 and 2023, introduced two new buildings alongside the restoration of five listed structures.

== Background ==
The complex contains five listed buildings, plus two new buildings added during the regeneration project from 2017 to 2023. The five individual listed structures within the complex are Hunslet Mill (Grade II*), Victoria Flax Mill entrance range and bollards, Victoria Works Range, the former drying house part of Victoria Flax Mill complex, and Mill Range (all Grade II listed).

At the time of its completion, the mill was the largest regeneration project of its kind in Europe.

== History ==
=== 1800–1970: Hunslet Mill and Victoria Works Complex ===
In 1838 the Victoria Works mill was constructed for W. B. Holdsworth. Victoria Works was occupied by a tailoring company called Botterill & Senior from the 1930s and later was owned by a firm of ironmongers called R. H. Bruce.

The adjacent Hunslet Mill was constructed by William Fairbairn for John Wilkinson and completed circa 1842. By 1847 some 1,500 female staff were employed in the mill reeling flax. The mill was occupied by a firm of linen manufacturers called Richard Buckton and Son from 1868 and then by a firm of blanket weavers called Dodgson and Hargreaves from the mid-1920s until it closed in 1966.

=== 2017–2023: Victoria Riverside ===
The complex, which had been derelict since the 1970s, was purchased by developers Evans Property Group and Caddick Developments. However these development plans ultimately failed to commence, meaning that the complex remained derelict until the current developers, JM Construction, bought the site in the mid-2010s to redevelop it. The scheme was supported by Leeds City Council as a part of its brownfield redevelopment plans.

The project to redevelop the complex was approved by the council in 2017 and construction began the same year. During the redevelopment a piece of newspaper was found dated 1919 amongst other artefacts by the developers. The development, which is called Victoria Riverside, consists of 356 apartments. The first phase of the redevelopment was completed in 2019.

In 2019 Historic England praised the redevelopment and the developer for their "vision and commitment". The final portion of the redevelopment was completed and sold for £17 million in 2023.

== Gallery ==
=== Post-restoration ===
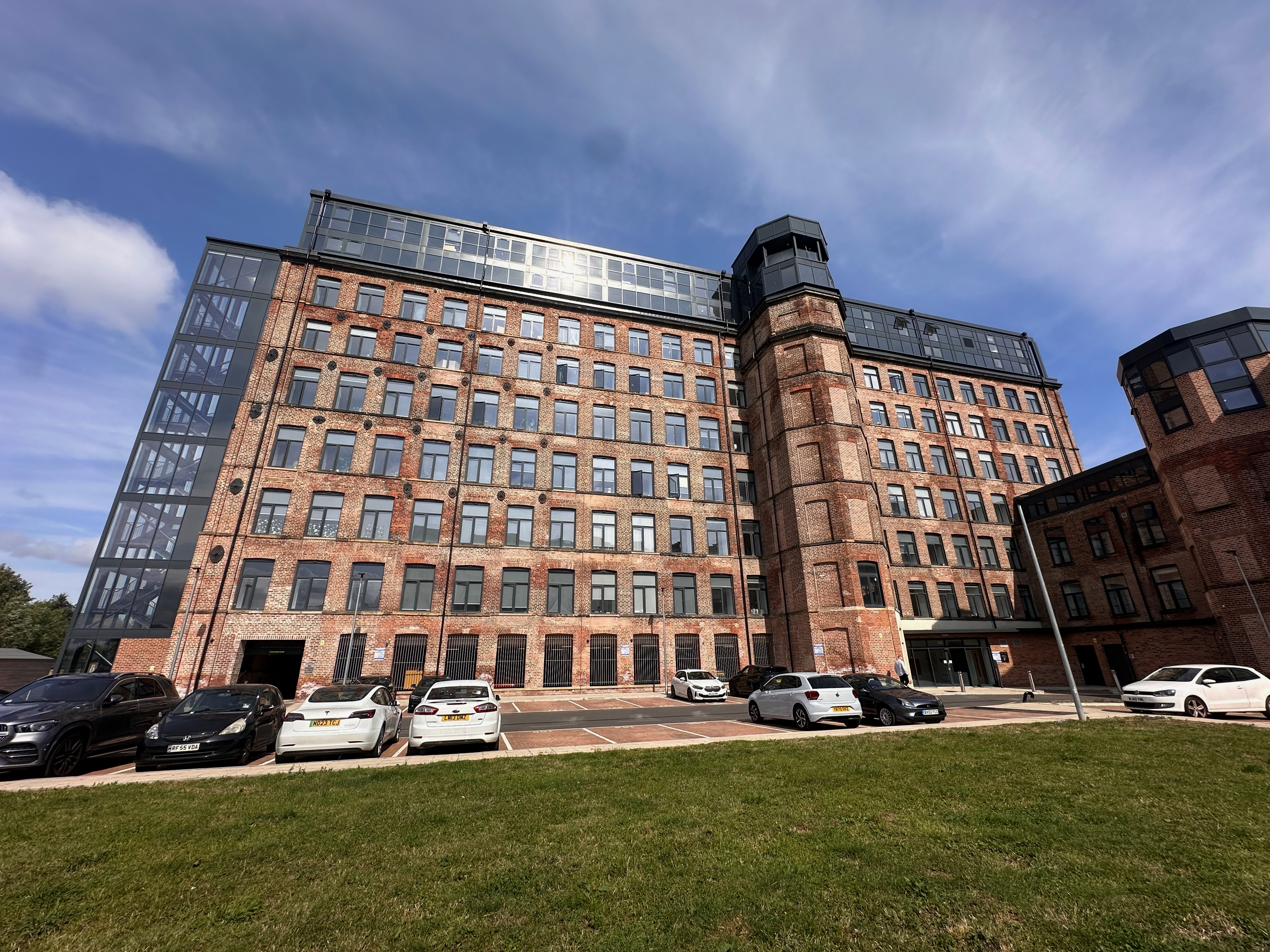

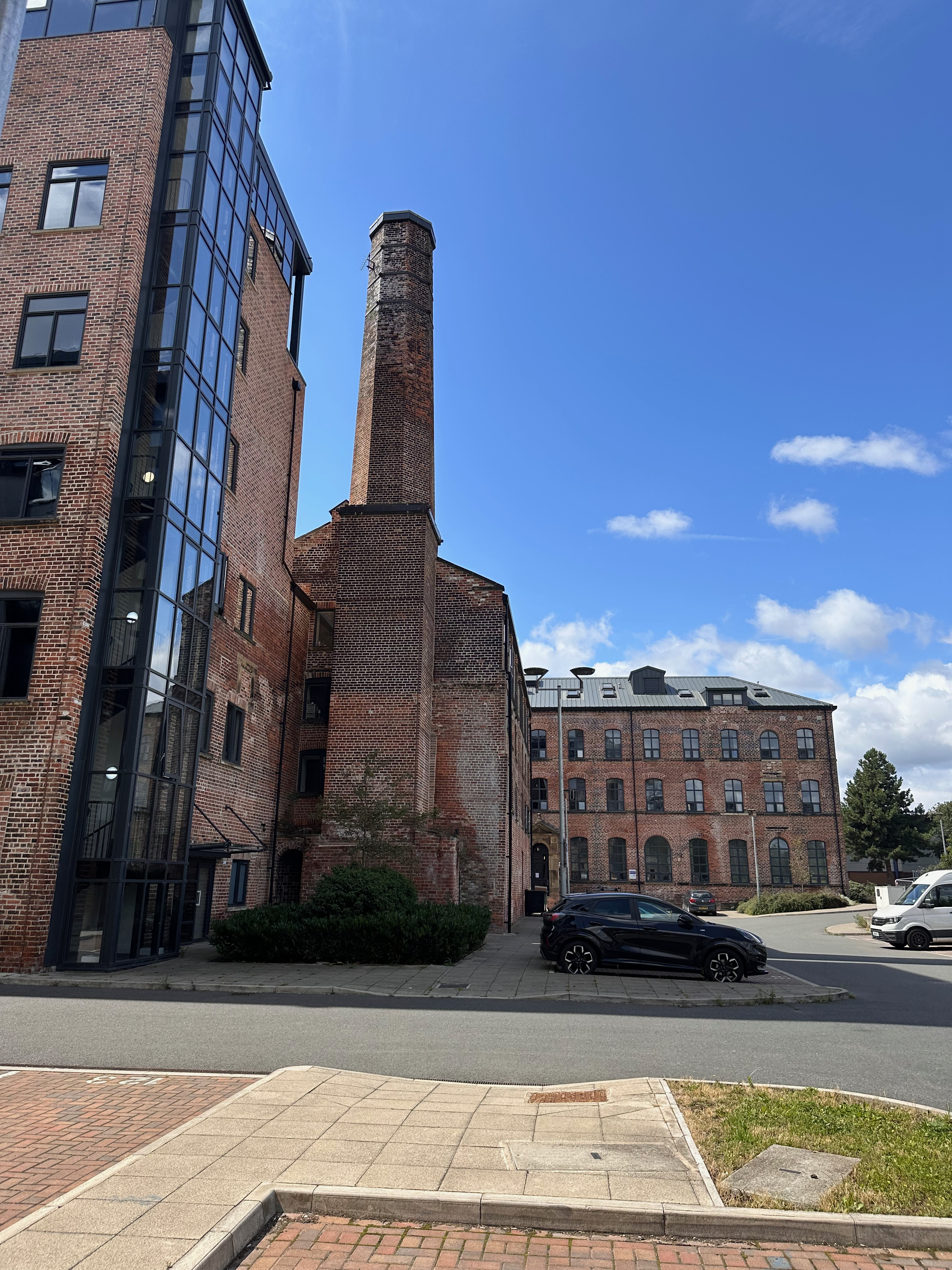

=== Pre-restoration ===
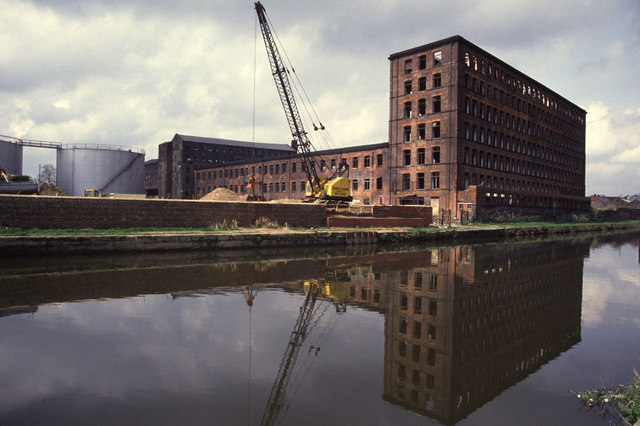

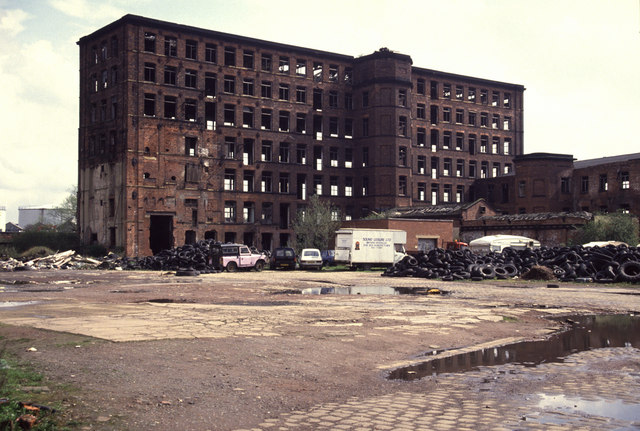

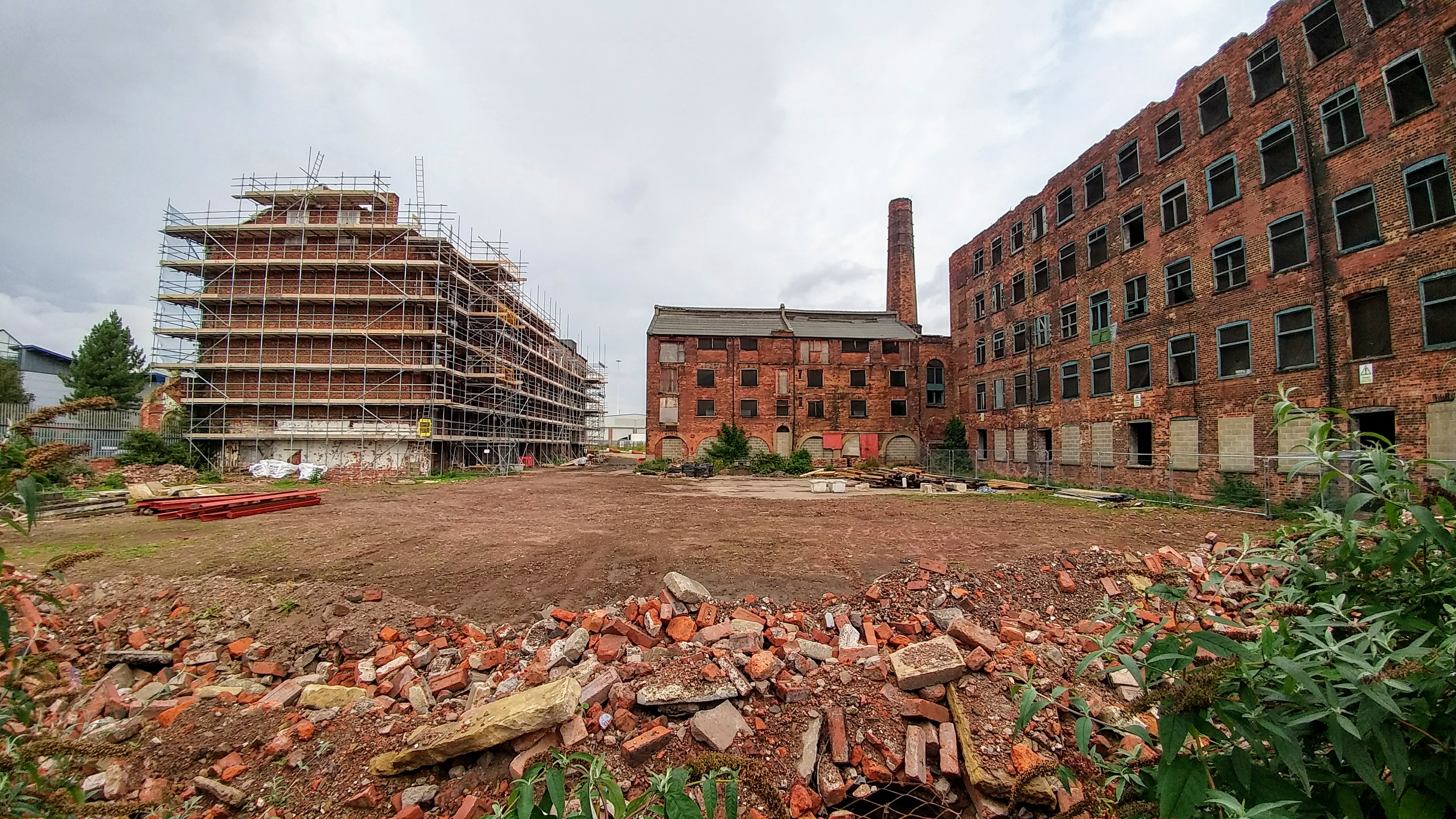

== See also ==
- Grade II* listed buildings in West Yorkshire
- Listed buildings in Leeds (City and Hunslet Ward - southern area)
