= Walton, Leeds =

Village and civil parish in West Yorkshire, England

Coordinates: 53°55′26″N 1°19′36″W

Walton
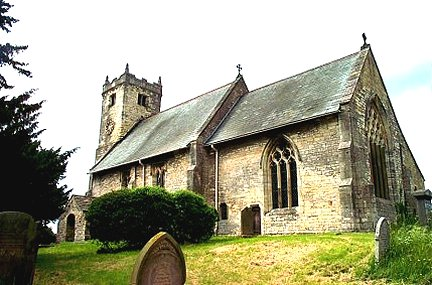
- St Peter's Church, Walton

- Location within West Yorkshire
- Population: 225 (2001 census)
- Civil parish: Walton
- Metropolitan borough: Leeds
- Metropolitan county: West Yorkshire
- Region: Yorkshire and the Humber
- Country: England
- Sovereign state: United Kingdom
- Post town: WETHERBY
- Postcode district: LS23
- Dialling code: 01924

Walton is a village and civil parish 2 miles (3 km) east of Wetherby, West Yorkshire, England. It is adjacent to Thorp Arch village and Thorp Arch Trading Estate. The nearest locally important town is Wetherby, with Tadcaster and the large village of Boston Spa nearby. Walton has a population of 225. increasing slightly to 225 at the 2011 Census.

The name Walton comes from settlement/farmstead of Wealas - native Celts which is what the new Anglo Saxon speaking peoples called the native inhabitants of England. There is strong evidence that in many areas of England taken over by Germanic speaking settlers, the native British (Wealas) remained undisturbed, farming the same land they did when the Romans left. Over time they just adopted or forgot their Celtic tongue (similar to Old Welsh/Cornish) for the language and culture of the newcomers in order to climb the social ladder or were coerced to do so. It was in the Anglo Saxon interest that the native British carry on as usual to ensure the economy produced food and goods for the new landowners.

For a while in the 1990s there was a plan to develop Walton into a New Town. Although this plan was never put into practice, the plan could still be brought back onto the table due to the land being still available and the communications in the area being even better.

The village has one public house, The Fox and Hound. This suffered a fire recently. The village is overlooked by the eight-storey buildings of the British Library on the Thorp Arch Trading estate. The trading estate was a former Royal Ordnance Factory, Thorp Arch, and it houses the local corporation (Leeds City Council) recycling centre, the British Library Boston Spa, George Moores furniture factory, a sewage works and retailing park (containing Empire Direct, DFS, The Sofa Company, The Greenery Garden Centre and many other retailers). The retail park once housed a Miller Brothers before the company liquidated and a Texas Homecare.

There are now speed cameras on the Walton Road, between Wetherby and Walton (the only ones in the area). The village also has a small church. Not being on a main road or itself having any notable features, Walton is little known outside of the Wetherby area of the City of Leeds metropolitan borough.

Walton was once on the Harrogate to Church Fenton Railway Line, until it was dismantled under the Beeching Axe in the 1960s. The village itself never had a railway station, the nearest being in Thorp Arch. The village is both commutable for the cities of Leeds and York.

== Folklore ==
The village was once famous for its 'rag well', the water of which was said to cure eye ailments. This name arose from the custom of tying strips of cloth ('rags') as momentoes to the tree by the well.

Swift Nicks, a notorious highwayman is said to have fallen asleep one day by the well and was surprised by a group of local men who had come to arrest him. He escaped by pointing a 'burrtree gun', or stick, at them. Thinking that it was a real gun, their courage deserted them and they ran off like frightened cattle. Since then, it seems that local men are often referred to as "Walton calves".

== See also ==
- Listed buildings in Walton, Leeds
