= St Peter's Church, Walton, Leeds =

St Peter's Church, Walton
- Church of Saint Peter, Walton
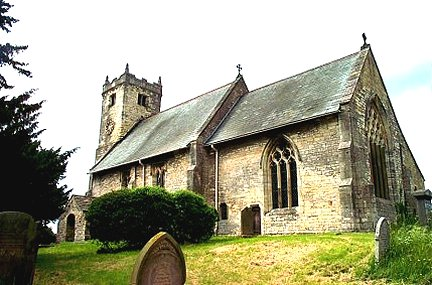
- St Peter's Church, Walton
- 53°55′29″N 1°19′47″W
- OS grid reference: SE 44114 47819
- Location: Walton (near Wetherby), West Yorkshire
- Country: England
- Denomination: Church of England

History
- Status: Parish Church

Architecture
- Heritage designation: Grade II* listed building
- Architect: W. M. Fawcett (19th century restoration)

Specifications
- Materials: Magnesian limestone with graduated green slate roofs

Administration
- Province: York
- Diocese: York
- Archdeaconry: Leeds
- Parish: Walton

The Church of St. Peter in Walton, near Wetherby in West Yorkshire, England, is an active Anglican parish church in the archdeaconry of York and the Diocese of York.

== History ==
The church originates from the 12th century, although most of the current structure dates from the 14th century, with an extensive restoration undertaken between 1890 and 1891 to the plans of architect W. M. Fawcett. On 30 March 1966, it was registered as a Grade II* listed building.

== Architectural style ==
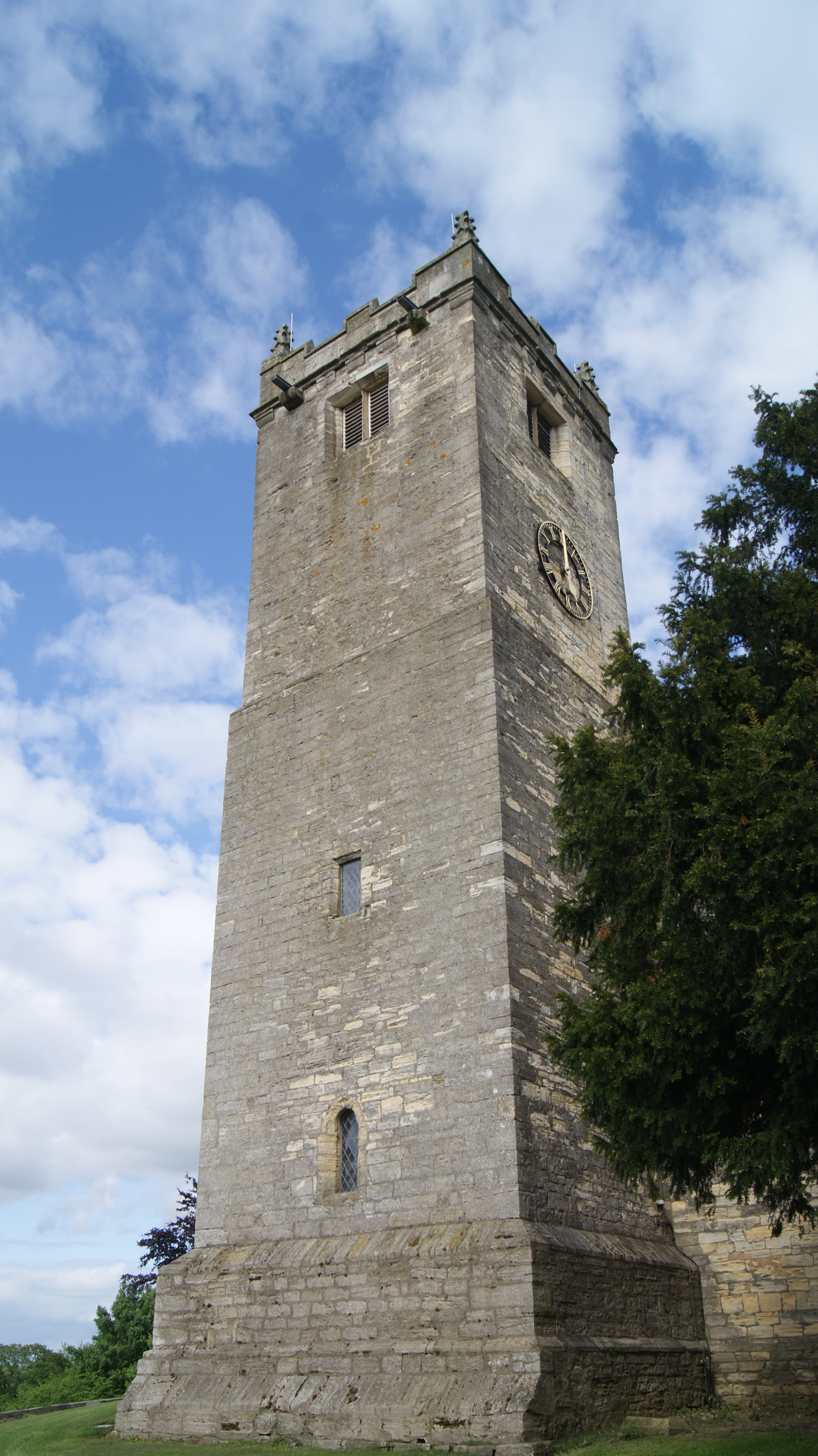
The church's west tower

The church is constructed of squared magnesian limestone with a graduated green slate roof. The church features a west tower with a clock on its south face, a three-bay nave with a south porch, and a narrower two-bay chancel accompanied by a vestry on the north side. The tower lacks buttresses and includes a small lancet window on its west side.

== See also ==
- List of places of worship in the City of Leeds
- Grade II* listed buildings in West Yorkshire
- Listed buildings in Walton, Leeds
