= Whitelock's Ale House =

Pub in Leeds, West Yorkshire, England

Coordinates: 53°47′50″N 1°32′35″W

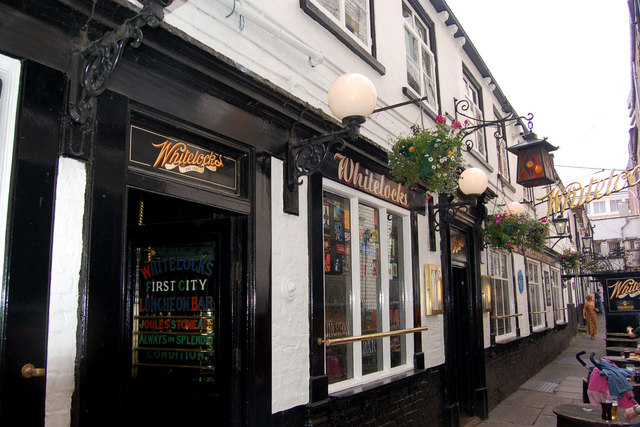
The pub in 2007

Whitelock's Ale House is a pub in the city centre of Leeds, in England.

The pub lies on Turk's Head Yard, on a narrow burgage plot off Briggate. The building it occupies was constructed in about 1700 as a row of cottages, and the easternmost of these was licensed as the Turk's Head pub in 1715. John Lupton Whitelock became the landlord in 1867, and in the 1880s he purchased the cottage, renaming the pub as Whitelock's First City Luncheon Bar.

In 1895, John's son, William Henry Whitelock, commissioned Waite & Sons to remodel the pub. It was extended into the next cottage, a new kitchen was created, and the whole was redecorated with a scheme which largely survives. As part of the refurbishment, electric lighting and an electric clock were installed, supposedly the first building in the city to have these features. The pub was later further extended, to encompass the whole terrace of cottages.

In the early 20th century, the landlord was Lupton Whitelock, a well known flautist, and under his management, the pub became popular with musicians, other artists, journalists and academics. Among its regulars was John Betjeman, who described as "the very heart of Leeds". Other regulars included Peter O'Toole, Len Hutton and Keith Waterhouse. Prince George once held a party in a curtained-off area of the pub.

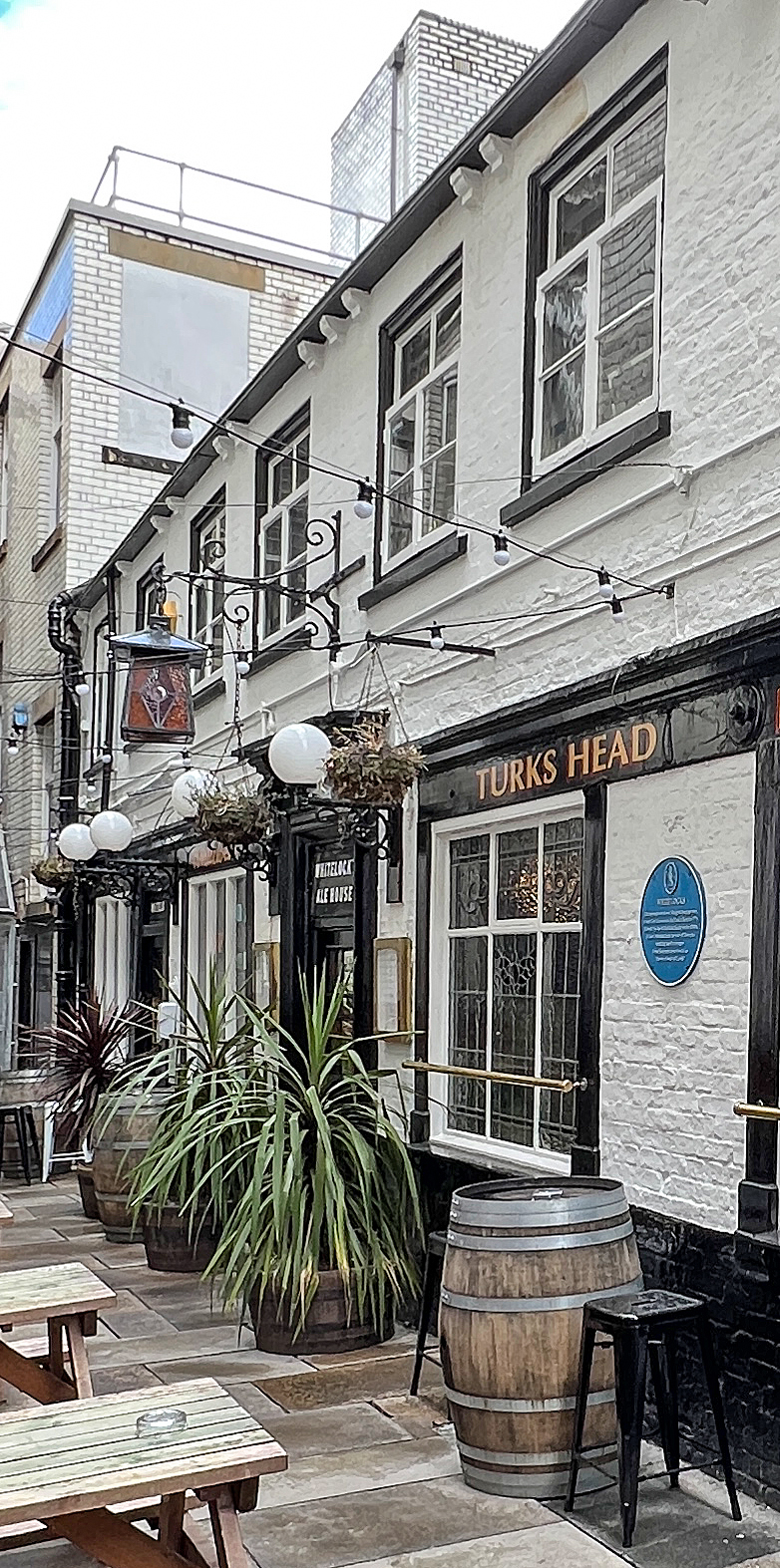
The Turks Head pub, in 2022

The pub was sold by the Whitelocks to Scottish Brewers in 1944. It was Grade II listed in 1963, and in 2022, it was upgraded to grade II*. It is also listed on the Campaign for Real Ale's National Inventory of Historic Pub Interiors. In 2015, the western part of the pub, which had formerly been a function room, was converted into a separate pub, named The Turks Head.

The building is built of brick, with stone dressings. It is mostly two storeys in height, with a cellar, although the western part is three storeys high. Some of the windows contain stained glass, mostly advertising the pub, although one above a doorway advertises an engraving business which was formerly based upstairs. In the main bar, part of which was formerly curtained off as a dining room, the walls are covered in mirrors and panelling. There are long bench seats, separated by baffles to form booths. The bar takes up half the rear wall, and has a tiled front, and a copper and marble top. The first floor former dining room also has panelling and mirrors, and retains a Victorian fireplace.
