= Helena Walker =

Helena Walker (1839-1910) was a well-regarded soprano from Leeds. Walker was very talented and between 1857-1877 she performed across England, Scotland and Ireland.

== Early life and education ==
Walker was born in Bramley near Leeds on 10 September 1839 and baptised on 10 November as Sarah Helena Walker. Her father, Joshua Walker, was a farmer.

She was taught music by Henry Smart and Dr William Spark and also studied in Germany.

== Career ==
She was a principal vocalist in the performance of Handel's 'Messiah' at the first Leeds Musical Festival at Leeds Town Hall in 1858.

Throughout her singing career she received glowing reviews for her 'clear, ringing, sweet-toned soprano voice, and really excellent style'. When she performed in Sheffield in 1861 the Sheffield Daily Telegraph noted the 'animated brilliancy' of her rendition of 'Rejoice Greatly' from the Messiah. In May 1868 she sang part of Haydn's 'Creation' at Leeds Town Hall in front of the Prince of Wales during his visit to open Roundhay Park.

Walker relocated from Leeds to Liverpool in October 1868. She married Alfred Thomas Haddock at St George's Church, Leeds on 5 September 1868. Her husband worked as a coal merchant and steamship agent and was son of Thomas Haddock, a professor of music. Around this time she seems to have knocked two years off her age, as in the 1871 census her birth year is recorded as 1841. She continued to perform across the country under her maiden name until 1877, after which time there seems to be no mention of her in the public sphere.

== Later life ==
Following the death of her husband, Walker moved to Harrogate to live with her older sister, Mary. She died on 27 January 1910 and was interred at Anfield, Liverpool.

A portrait of Walker by Fred Casano is in the collection of Leeds Museums and Galleries.
