= Holy Trinity Church, Leeds =

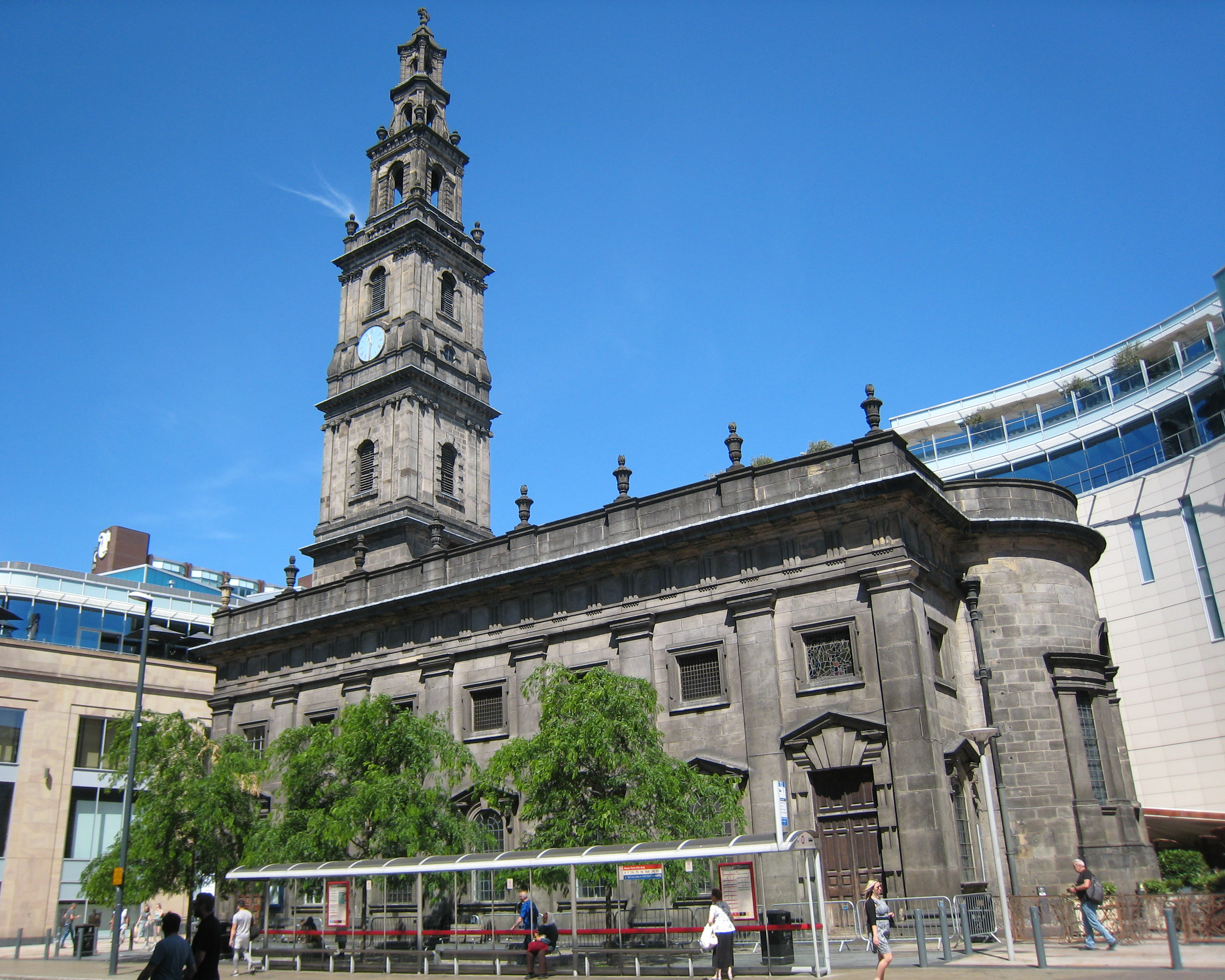
- Holy Trinity Church, Leeds
- Holy Trinity Church, Leeds
- 53.796188°N 1.543563°W
- Denomination: Church of England
- Website: www.holytrinityboarlane.org

History
- Founded: 1727

Architecture
- Heritage designation

Listed Building – Grade I
- Designated: 26 September 1963
- Reference no.: 1255870
- Architect: William Etty
- Completed: 1727

Administration
- Province: York
- Diocese: Leeds
- Archdeaconry: Leeds
- Deanery: Headingley
- Parish: Leeds St George Team Ministry

Clergy
- Vicar: Revd Josh Lees

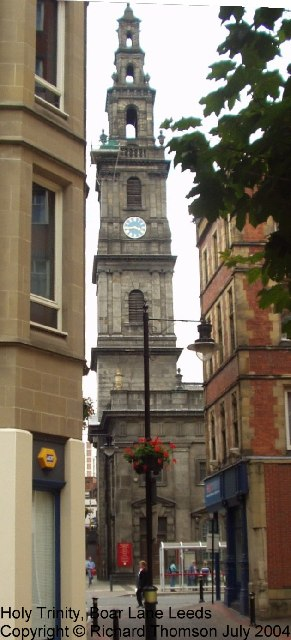
Etty's tower and Chantrell's steeple

Holy Trinity Church lies on Boar Lane in Leeds, West Yorkshire, England. It is a Grade I listed Church of England parish church in the Parish of Leeds St George in the Diocese of Leeds. It was built in 1722–7, though its steeple dates from 1839. Holy Trinity is in the evangelical church tradition of the Church of England.

== History and architecture ==
A 1714 proposal that a new church should be erected in central Leeds foundered for lack of subscribers, but, in 1722, Lady Elizabeth Hastings of Ledston, backed by leading merchants, revived the project, and the foundation stone of Holy Trinity was laid on 27 August 1722.

The architect of the church was for some time believed to be William Halfpenny. However, it has subsequently been discovered that his designs for the church, for which he was paid £1 11s 6d on 8 May 1723, were never executed, and that the architect was William Etty of York. A letter from William Cookson to Ralph Thoresby dated 15 May 1723, enclosed "a draught [sic], the south front of our new church"; it was drawn by Mr. Etty of York, who has also made us a wooden model for our workmen to go by." Etty had been paid nineteen guineas in April of the same year for the model, which survived into the nineteenth century.

The west tower in Halfpenny's design was topped by a square, open colonnade with an obelisk-shaped spire. Etty did not envisage a spire, but a wooden one was later added by an unknown hand. Thomas Dunham Whitaker, Vicar of Whalley, Lancashire, in his Loidis and Elmete (1816), remarked of this spire: "unquestionably one instance among many of private interference, by which the better judgment of real architects is often overruled, and for which they are unjustly considered as responsible." When the spire blew down in 1839, it was replaced by a taller stone steeple of three diminishing stages (architect: Robert Dennis Chantrell).

In 2020 a major refurbishment of the building was completed to be home to a midweek ministry for city centre workers. In 2021, St George's Church took on responsibility for the City Centre Mission based at Holy Trinity. The Revd Josh Lees is currently the Vicar at Holy Trinity. Holy Trinity works as a team with two other churches: St George's and St Augustine's Church, Wrangthorn.

== See also ==
- Grade I listed churches in West Yorkshire
- Listed buildings in Leeds (City and Hunslet Ward - northern area)
