= Our Lady of Lourdes Church, Leeds =

Our Lady of Lourdes Church
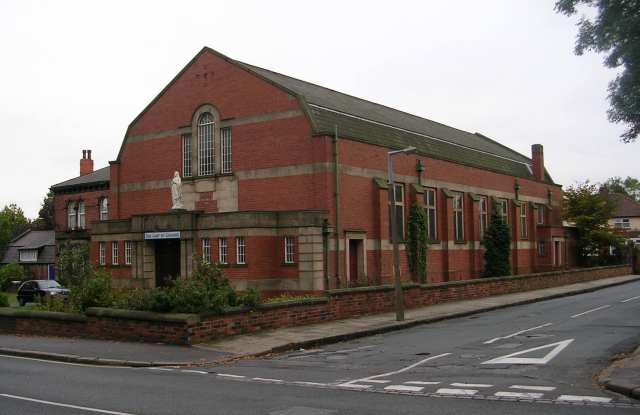
- South-west side of the church
- Our Lady of Lourdes Church
- 53.813122°N 1.576868°W
- OS grid reference: SE 27958 35285
- Country: England
- Denomination: Roman Catholic
- Website: jeannejuganleeds.org.uk

History
- Former name: Sacred Heart Chapel
- Status: Active
- Founder: Society of Jesus
- Dedication: Our Lady of Lourdes
- Dedicated: 1954

Architecture
- Functional status: Parish church
- Groundbreaking: 1925
- Completed: 1930

Administration
- Province: Liverpool
- Diocese: Leeds
- Deanery: Leeds North
- Parish: St Jeanne Jugan

Our Lady of Lourdes Church is a Roman Catholic church in the parish of St Jeanne Jugan, Leeds. It was built by the Society of Jesus in the 1920s and it is situated on Cardigan Road in Burley, Leeds.

== History ==
When the church was originally built it was called the Sacred Heart Chapel, because it was a chapel of ease for the Sacred Heart Parish church in Leeds.

=== Foundation ===
In 1890, a provost of Leeds Cathedral, Browne, created a Mass centre for the Burley area when he bought a cottage on the corner of Poplar Street and Burley Road. This became the home of the Sacred Heart Parish.

In 1905, William Gordon, Roman Catholic Bishop of Leeds, invited the Jesuits to take over the running of it. Shortly afterwards, the presbytery was moved to Vinery Road and the Jesuits built a church on the site of the old cottage, which became the parish church of the local area, Sacred Heart Church.

A small primary school, Sacred Heart Catholic Primary School, was built to the rear of the church. The Jesuits also started a nearby secondary school, Leeds Catholic College on 18 September 1905. In 1933, it became St Michael's College.

=== Construction ===
Plans for Sacred Heart Chapel began in the early 1920s, James O’Brien created another presbytery by acquiring a house on the Cardigan Road. In 1925 plans were drawn up by J. Armstrong of Leeds for a new church hall to be built next to the presbytery. Unfortunately, work came to a halt soon afterwards, supposedly because of ‘the fraudulent activities of the architect’. Three years later, the new architect Edward Simpson brought the construction to a close by finishing the building in 1930. He altered the designs of the building so that it could be used as both a chapel and a church hall. It was named Sacred Heart Chapel after the main parish church it was attached to.

In 1932, a new choir gallery and organ were built at the west side of the chapel. In 1939, a hall for the 'Boys' Club' was built, which became the present church hall.

=== Our Lady of Lourdes Church ===
In 1947, the Jesuits withdrew from the area and handed over the entire Sacred Heart parish, both the parish church and the chapel of ease, to the Diocese of Leeds, who continue to minister to the local Catholic population. In 1954, the chapel of ease became a separate parish and was renamed Our Lady of Lourdes Parish Church.

In 1959, the interior was renovated by the architect Derek Walker. Within the church is a fresco by Aidan Hart, who also worked on the Saint John's Bible.

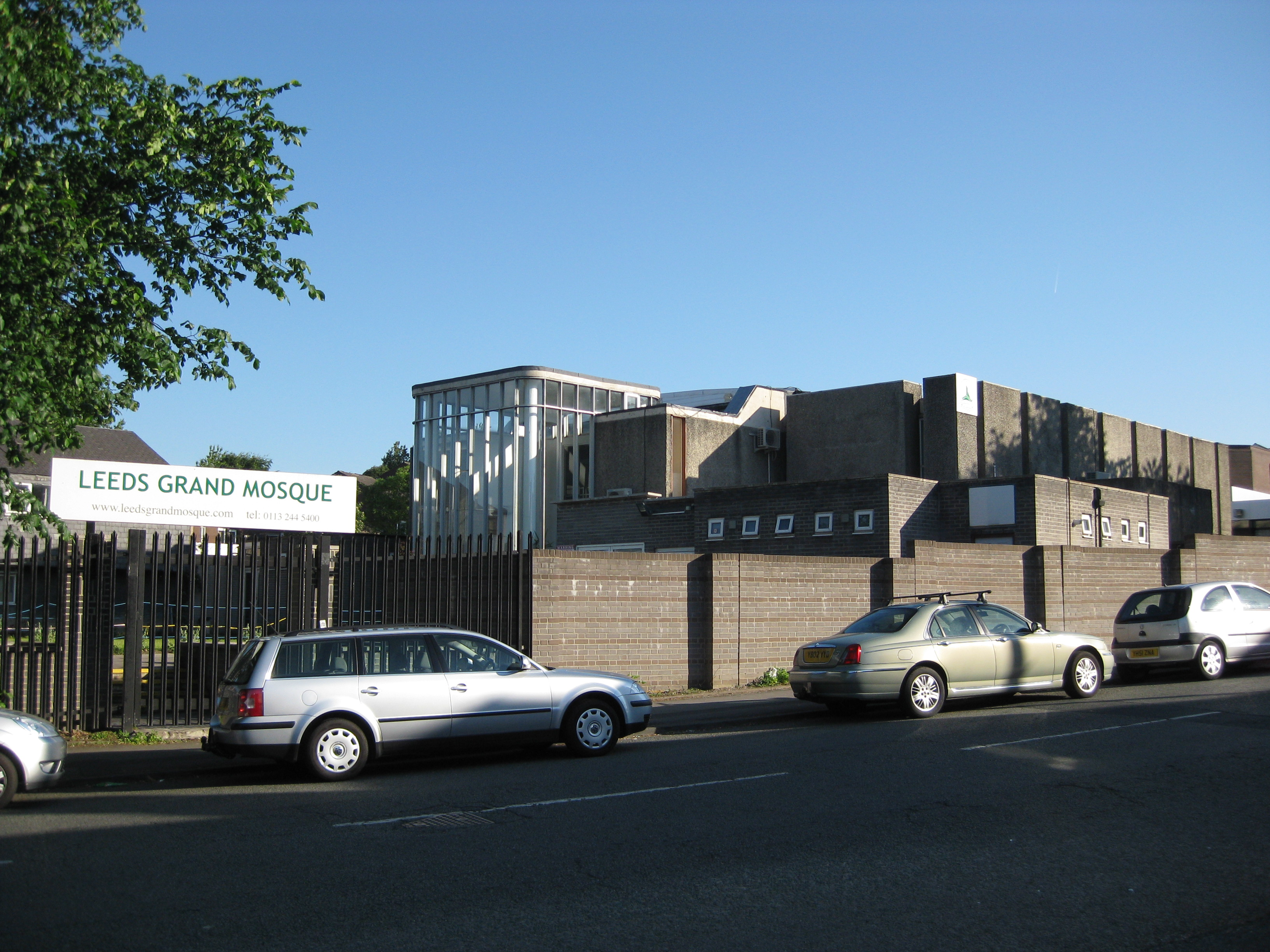
Sacred Heart Church, which became Leeds Grand Mosque in 1997

=== Sacred Heart Church ===
In the 1960s, the County Borough of Leeds undertook large-scale construction projects across the city. Sacred Heart Church, the primary school, and the Poplar Street area were all demolished. The school moved to Eden Way, between the Kirkstall Road and Argie Avenue, where it still continues. Sacred Heart Church was rebuilt in the Hyde Park area. It was a modernist building designed also by Derek Walker. In the 1990s, the church was sold and was bought in 1994 by Sheikh Saif Bin Muhammad Al-Nehayyan of Abu Dhabi, who converted it into Leeds Grand Mosque.

== Architecture ==
=== Exterior ===
Our Lady of Lourdes Church, which was once a hall, is built with red bricks with stone bands and a mansard slate roof. The front entrance has three smaller slit windows either side of it and a larger Venetian window above it. The stone banding forms a parapet above the entrance. There is a statue of Our Lady of Lourdes on the parapet. Either side of the main entrance are doric designed columns on a rusticated frame.

=== Interior ===
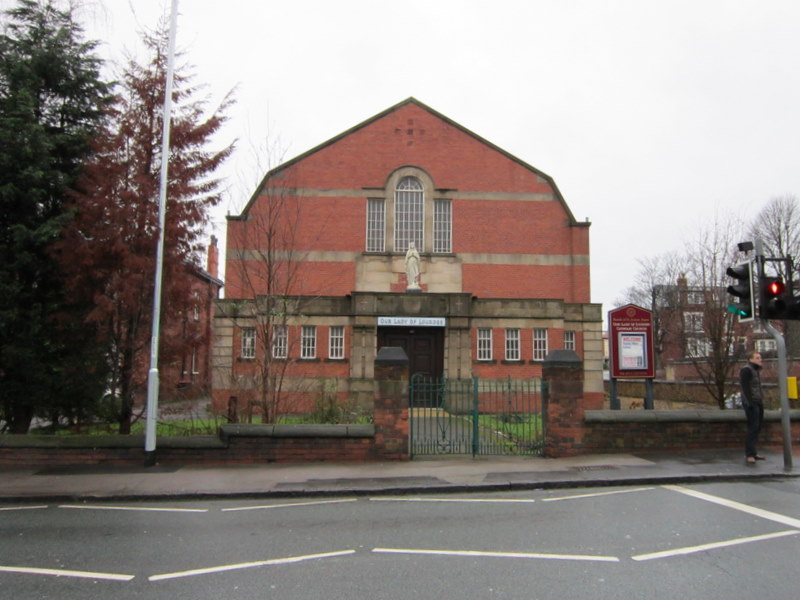
West side of church

In 1959, attempts were made by the architect, Derek Walker, to have the building look more like a place of worship than a church hall. The old sanctuary was removed and entirely replaced. It was lowered by two feet and two screens made of metal were placed either side of the sanctuary allowing for two separate spaces. The stained glass panel to the left of the altar depicts Jesus Christ and the panel to the left depicts Our Lady of Lourdes. There are frieze bands above the screens depicting the heads of angels. The altar reredos is a white panel made of plaster. The altar is made of Hopton Wood Stone and shows Jesus with the twelve apostles. The church is composed of one single space without separation. The ceiling has a series of trusses with timber slats attached to them. Above the altar is a metal canopy, designed by Walker, that resembles the crown of thorns. To the right of the sanctuary is a Blessed Sacrament chapel with a polychrome enamel tabernacle. The sacristy is behind the sanctuary and is the same width as the church. There is a narthex with a porch, entrance lobby and toilets at the west end of the church.

== St Jeanne Jugan Parish ==
In 2010, the parish was merged with St Urban's Church in Headingley to become one parish named after St Jeanne Jugan.

The church has one Sunday Mass every week, at 8:45 am on Sundays. St Urban's Church has Mass times not to conflict with Our Lady of Lourdes church, it has Mass at 6:00 pm on Saturdays and at 10:30 am on Sundays. St Urban's Church usually has Mass from Monday to Friday at 9:15 am, whereas Our Lady of Lourdes Church has a Mass at midday on Saturday.

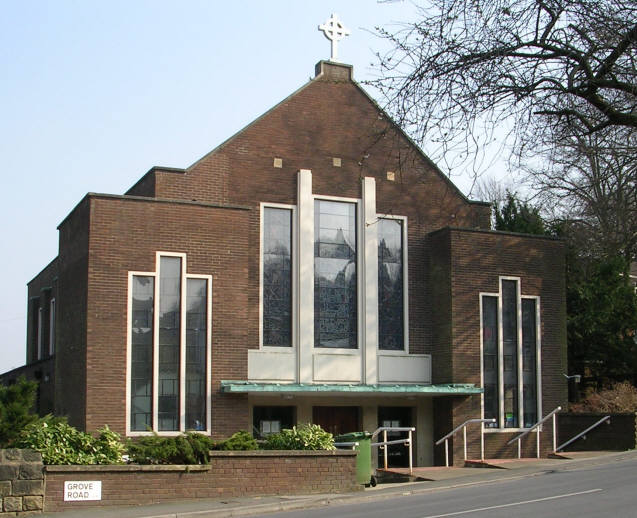
St Urban's Church, within the same parish as Our Lady of Lourdes Church

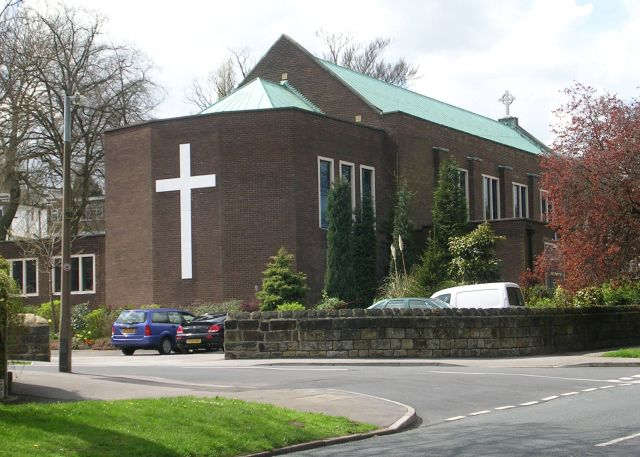
East side of the St Urban's Church

== See also ==
- Society of Jesus
