= Leeds Church Extension Society =

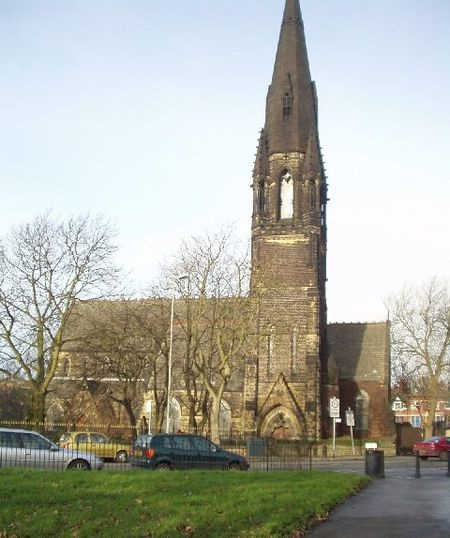
St. Augustine's, Wrangthorne, Leeds

The Leeds Church Extension Society is a Church of England organisation which funds church and clergy developments in the City of Leeds. It was founded in 1864 to help build churches and to pay for clergy in the rapidly expanding city. It became incorporated in 1905.

Churches funded include St. Silas in Hunslet, St. Cross in Middleton, St. Augustine's Wrangthorne and St. Paul's in Ireland Wood.
