= Hyde Park, Leeds =

Area of Leeds, England

Coordinates: 53.81141°N 1.57245°W

Hyde Park
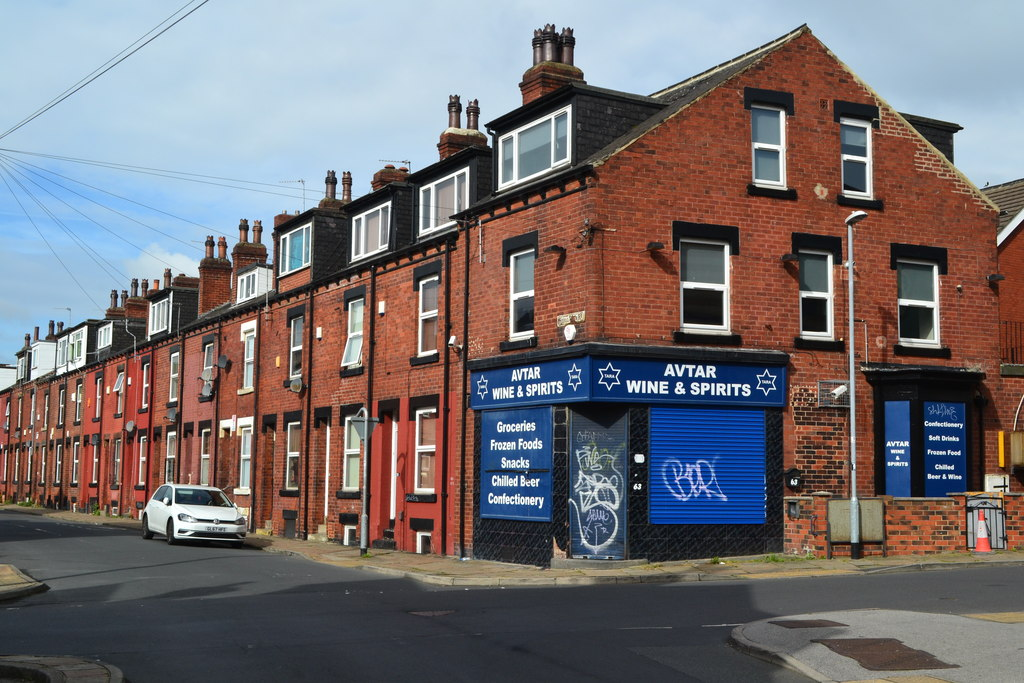
- A typical terrace and corner shop off Royal Park Road

- Location within West Yorkshire
- OS grid reference: SE282350
- Metropolitan borough: City of Leeds
- Metropolitan county: West Yorkshire
- Region: Yorkshire and the Humber
- Country: England
- Sovereign state: United Kingdom
- Post town: LEEDS
- Postcode district: LS6
- Dialling code: 0113
- Police: West Yorkshire
- Fire: West Yorkshire
- Ambulance: Yorkshire
- UK Parliament: Leeds Central and Headingley

Hyde Park is an inner-city residential area of north-west Leeds, West Yorkshire, England, situated between the University of Leeds and Headingley. It sits in the Headingley and Hyde Park ward of Leeds City Council.

The area is in the centre of the city's student community, being next to Headingley, another large student community. There are also many full-time, long-term, non-student families and single people, and a sizable South Asian community.

Before the dense speculative developments of red brick terraced housing in the late Victorian era, the area was the site of the Leeds Royal Park pleasure ground, quarries, and fields in the estate of the Earl of Cardigan. The Hyde Park name was extended to the new neighbourhoods from Hyde Park Corner on the A660, with that nucleus historically being known as Wrangthorn.

== Toponymy ==
Street map including the generally accepted Hyde Park boundaries

The area surrounding Hyde Park Corner was originally known as Wrangthorn, a name still used in the Church of England parish Woodhouse and Wrangthorn, and at St Augustine's Church, Wrangthorn. The name Hyde Park seems to have been extended to the present area from the name of the road junction Hyde Park Corner, itself apparently named in the nineteenth century on the inspiration of Hyde Park, London. According to J. Landfear Lucas, writing in 1914,

Two suggested explanations have been offered. The first is to the effect that, in the year 1800, a farmhouse was built on the site of the present Wrangthorn Church, by Nathaniel Atkinson, whose son John carried on the farm after his father's death, the land extending from the Cardigan estate to the slopes of Woodhouse Ridge, John Atkinson and a friend or two took coach to London, and on their safe return had a meeting in the farmhouse, and over a bowl of punch solemnly gave the district the name of "Hyde Park Corner" to commemorate their pleasant visit to London. The present "Hyde Park" Hotel at Leeds was then called the "Red Lion," but its name was soon afterwards changed ... The second suggested explanation is that the builder and proprietor of certain houses which formed the nucleus of the present Hyde Park Road in Leeds had named a new street "Henrietta" after a beloved daughter. Subsequently, however, he took a journey to London, where, to his annoyance, he found that a Henrietta Street bore an evil repute. On the other hand, Hyde Park had pleased him mightily, and on his return he substituted that appellation, and reserved "Henrietta" exclusively for his daughter.

== Community ==
The community is ethnically diverse, including a large Pakistani population.

In July 2005, Hyde Park became the focus of international attention as police carried out a raid connected to the 7 July 2005 London bombings. Officers used a controlled explosion to enter a property at 28 Alexandra Grove, situated roughly where the Hyde Park and Burley areas meet. Hundreds of local residents were evacuated as police searched the house, one of six in West Yorkshire to be raided that day. Despite media speculation that the house had allegedly been used as a 'bomb factory' by the suicide bombers, police later said they found no explosives in the property.

In July 1995 the area suffered serious rioting after the taking over of a local pub, The Newlands, by the police to be used in surveillance. The local community rallied and created Unity Day, a popular community festival started by the Hyde Park Residents Association held on the adjacent Woodhouse Moor, usually in August. The non-student community is vibrant, artsy and centres around Unity Day, Friends of Woodhouse Moor, Royal Park Community Consortium and other groups.

== Amenities ==
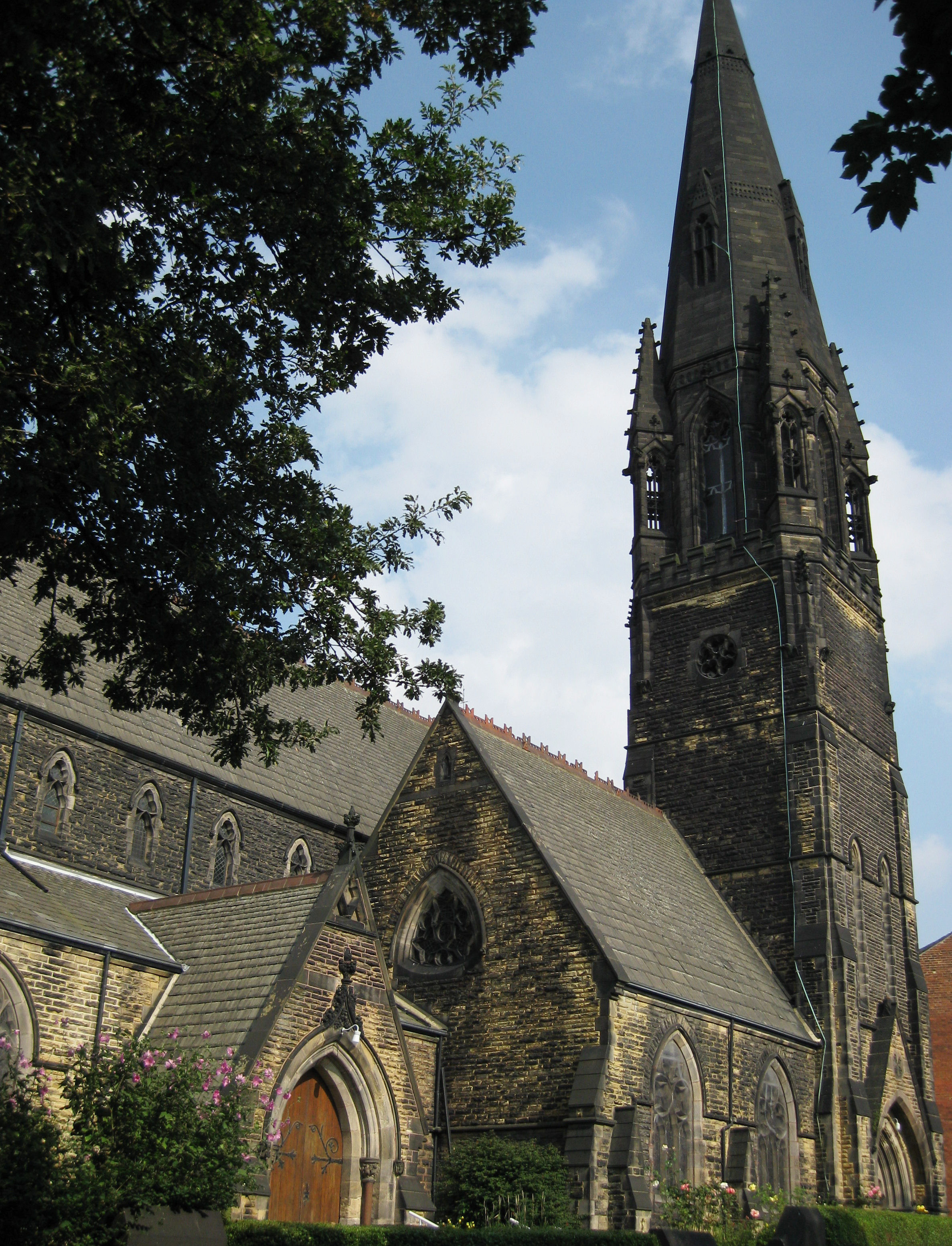
Wrangthorn Church

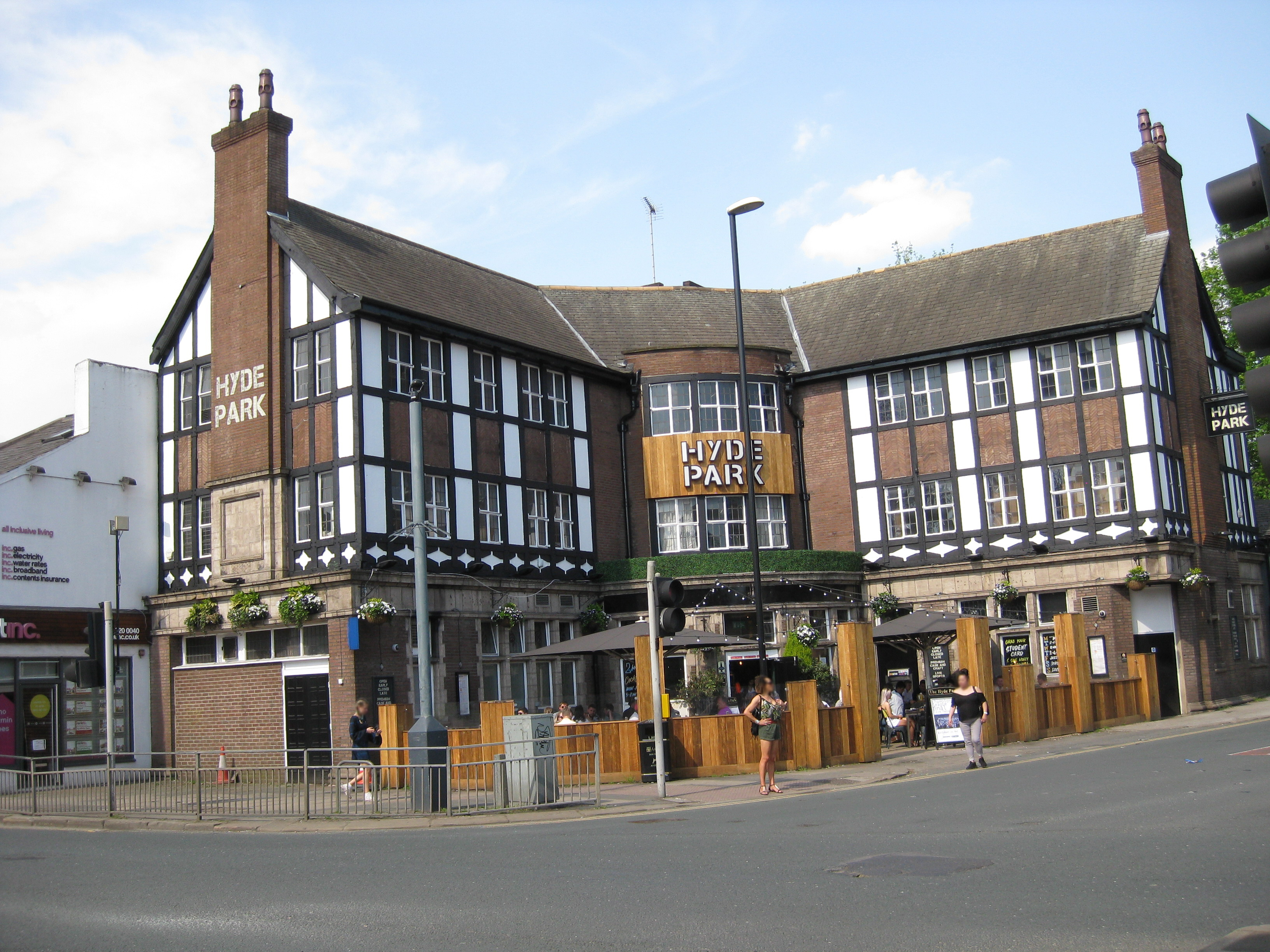
Hyde Park Corner

The area is home to many places of worship: three mosques, namely Makkah Masjid, the Al Madinah Masjid, and the Leeds Grand Mosque, the latter being the largest in Leeds, one Hindu temple, two Anglican churches, namely All Hallows Church and St Augustine's Wrangthorn, and a catholic church named Our Lady of Lourdes Catholic Church. Alongside outlets primarily catering for the student population there remain a number of smaller shops selling largely traditional South Asian goods. This arguably lessens the impact of studentification, though some community groups do consider this to be a problem and tension exists.

Cultural facilities include the Hyde Park Picture House, an historic independent art house cinema. The Royal Park, on Queen's Road, is a large public house with a downstairs gig venue, popular with the student population, and next door stands the Brudenell Social Club, a members' club which is a venue for local and underground music.

There are also a number of cafes and shops at Hyde Park Corner, including a vintage and antiques store and a Greek cafe. The area has many local or independent shops, such as DIY stores, takeaways, fruit and vegetable shops, two Sainsbury's stores, a Coop and two independent mini supermarkets, a pharmacy, a laundrette, and three vintage clothes stores.

The area is close to Burley Park railway station and benefits from good bus links into the city centre and North Leeds, which makes the area popular with young professionals.

Woodhouse Moor, which sits between Hyde Park, Woodhouse and the University campus, is one of the most used parks in the city.

== Housing ==
The majority of residential properties in the area are late Victorian and Edwardian back-to-back brick terraces or face onto wide streets with communal access alleyways at the rear. A small area of 1980s council housing lies between Hyde Park Road and Woodsley Road, these replaced terrace housing demolished due to slum clearance. Main roads are cambered and some still retain original Yorkstone pavements and iron guttering. However, Leeds City Council has been removing much of the stone paving and granite kerbs to be replaced by modern tarmac and concrete. A large number of houses in Hyde Park are owned by private landlords who rent to students.

== Notable residents ==
- The members of Dinosaur Pile-Up lived in Hyde Park in the 2000s and 2010s.
- Musician Tom Greenhalgh lived in the area while studying at the University of Leeds.
- Musician Andy Gill lived in the area while studying at the University of Leeds.
- Guitarist Chris Haskett lived at 52 Harold Mount between 1982 and 1987.
- Musician Jon Langford lived in the area while studying at the University of Leeds.
- The members of gothic rock band the Mission lived in Hyde Park during the 1980s.
- Actor Chris Pine, famous for playing Captain James T. Kirk in the film Star Trek lived on Brudenell Road, whilst studying on a year abroad at the University of Leeds.
- The members of Pulled Apart by Horses lived in Hyde Park in the 2000s and 2010s.
- Swallows and Amazons author Arthur Ransome was born in the area: a blue plaque on No 6 Ash Grove commemorates this.
- Singer Corinne Bailey Rae lived here.
- Singer Henry Rollins lived briefly at 52 Harold Mount in 1986, where he wrote the material of his first solo album Hot Animal Machine.
- Alex Sobel (born 1975), MP
- Cricketer Hedley Verity, (1905–1943) a left-arm bowler, was born in Welton Grove; he played over 300 matches for Yorkshire and in 40 test matches for England.
- Singer Ricky Wilson, of the band Kaiser Chiefs, lived in Hyde Park whilst a student at Leeds Metropolitan University. Ricky Wilson still lives nearby.

== See also ==
- Listed buildings in Leeds (Hyde Park and Woodhouse)
