= William Spark =

English musician, writer and composer

William Spark (28 October 1823 – 16 June 1897) was an English musician, writer, composer and organist based in Leeds.

== Early life and education ==
Spark was born in Exeter on 28 October 1823 and died in Leeds on 16 June 1897. He was a chorister at Exeter Cathedral and studied with the composer Samuel Sebastian Wesley in his home town of Exeter in 1840 and moved with him to Leeds in 1842.

== Career ==
Spark's first post was as deputy organist to Wesley at Leeds Parish Church in 1842. He then worked as organist and choirmaster at Chapeltown Church.

In 1850 Spark was appointed organist to St George's Church. In 1859 he helped to design the organ for Leeds Town Hall together with Henry Smart. The following year he was appointed Leeds Municipal Organist and held the post until his death in 1897.

He was a major contributor to the musical life of 19th-century Leeds. He founded the Leeds Madrigal and Motet Society and the Leeds Recreation Society. The latter organised People's Concerts in the Albion Street Music Hall from 1852 to 1859. From 1864 he helped to organise orchestral subscription concerts at Leeds Town Hall and was a key organiser of the Leeds Triennial Musical Festivals.

Spark was a Freemason and member of the Lodge of Fidelity No.289, Leeds and was for many years their organist.

== Writing career ==
In 1851 Spark wrote a Lecture on Church Music, More Particularly the Choral Service of the Church of England as Applied to Parochial Worship.

In 1869 he began publishing the Organist’s Quarterly Journal to showcase new organ compositions by English and continental composers.

In 1888 he published a collection of his writings and reminiscences under the title Musical Memories, including portraits of the conductor Sir Michael Costa, composer Felix Mendelssohn and soprano Adelina Patti.

A further book Musical Reminiscences: Past and Present was published in 1892.

== Compositions ==
Easy Voluntary in G major

Gavotte in D Major

Grand March composed by in celebration of Leeds being made a City, 1893

Immanuel (oratorio) 1887-1889

Introduction & Fughetto in E flat

Jerusalem the Golden

Minuet in A Minor

The Worthy Mason

The Ancient Vesper Hymn 'Theme, variations and fugue'
