= Leeds Grand Mosque =

Mosque in West Yorkshire, England

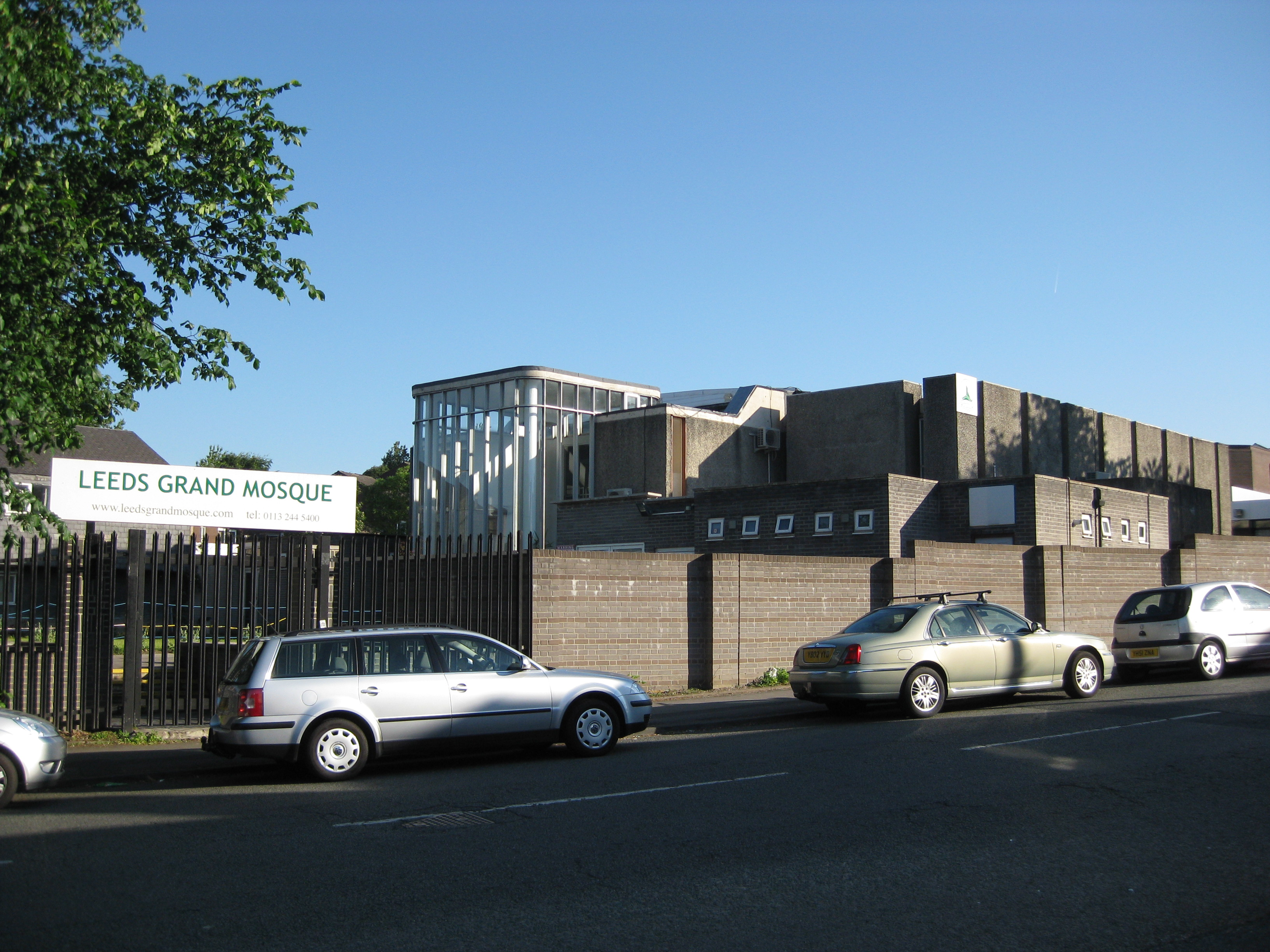

- Location within Leeds

Religion
- Affiliation: Islam

Location
- Location: Leeds, England
- Coordinates: 53°48′23.1″N 1°34′05.3″W

Architecture
- Type: mosque
- Established: 1994
- Capacity: 1,500+

Website
- Official website

Leeds Grand Mosque (LGM) is a mosque in Leeds, England with a regular congregation of 3,000. It is located at 9 Woodsley Road, Hyde Park, Leeds, LS6 1SN West Yorkshire, England. The mosque has a diverse and ethnically mixed congregation with facilities for both male and female worshippers. The Friday prayer sermon is also delivered in English also alongside the Arabic.

The mosque's Imam is Sheikh Dr Mohammed Taher. The resident Islamic scholar to the mosque is Sheikh Abdullah Al Judai’.

It is the home of the first Muslim Scout Group in Leeds. 15 Scouts were invested at the launch in 2006.

== Building ==
It was originally Sacred Heart Church designed by Derek Walker, completed in 1965 and described as "One of the most striking churches to be built in the 1960s". The design is Brutalist based on a concrete frame clad with pre-cast panels of Cornish granite aggregate. It closed in 1993 and was sold and converted in 1994, with funding from Saif Bin Muhammad Al-Nehayyan of Abu Dhabi, United Arab Emirates. The chancel was converted into a smaller worship hall used on weekdays, and a women's gallery was constructed at the rear of the main hall, later augmented by converting the choir gallery into a second women's gallery. The stained glass window and Christian symbols were removed, and facilities for wudu installed.

The main hall provides a large open space which is used as the main prayer area for men.

In 2013 a storm lifted part of the roof off, resulting in extensive rain damage.

== Facilities ==
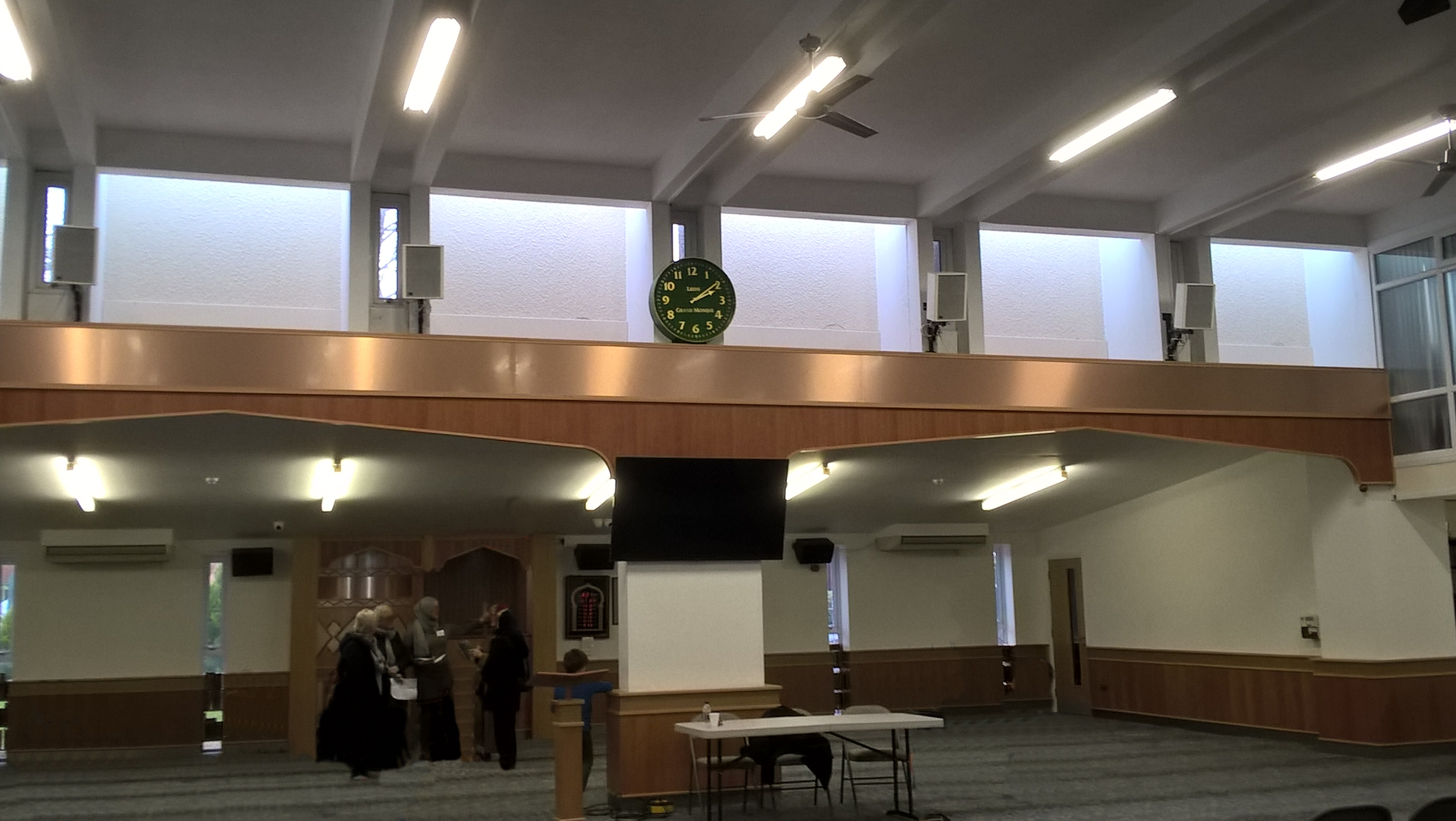
Main hall on public open day

- Male prayer hall
- Female prayer hall
- Lecture room
- Basement – used for multiple activities
- Library
- Catering kitchen
- Management office, storage rooms, and washing facilities for both males and females
- Fenced car park for 20 cars
- Gardens around the mosque
- Linked house, rented as a source of income

== See also ==
- Islam in England
- List of mosques in the United Kingdom
