= St Augustine's Church, Wrangthorn =

Church in Leeds, West Yorkshire, England

St Augustine's, Wrangthorn
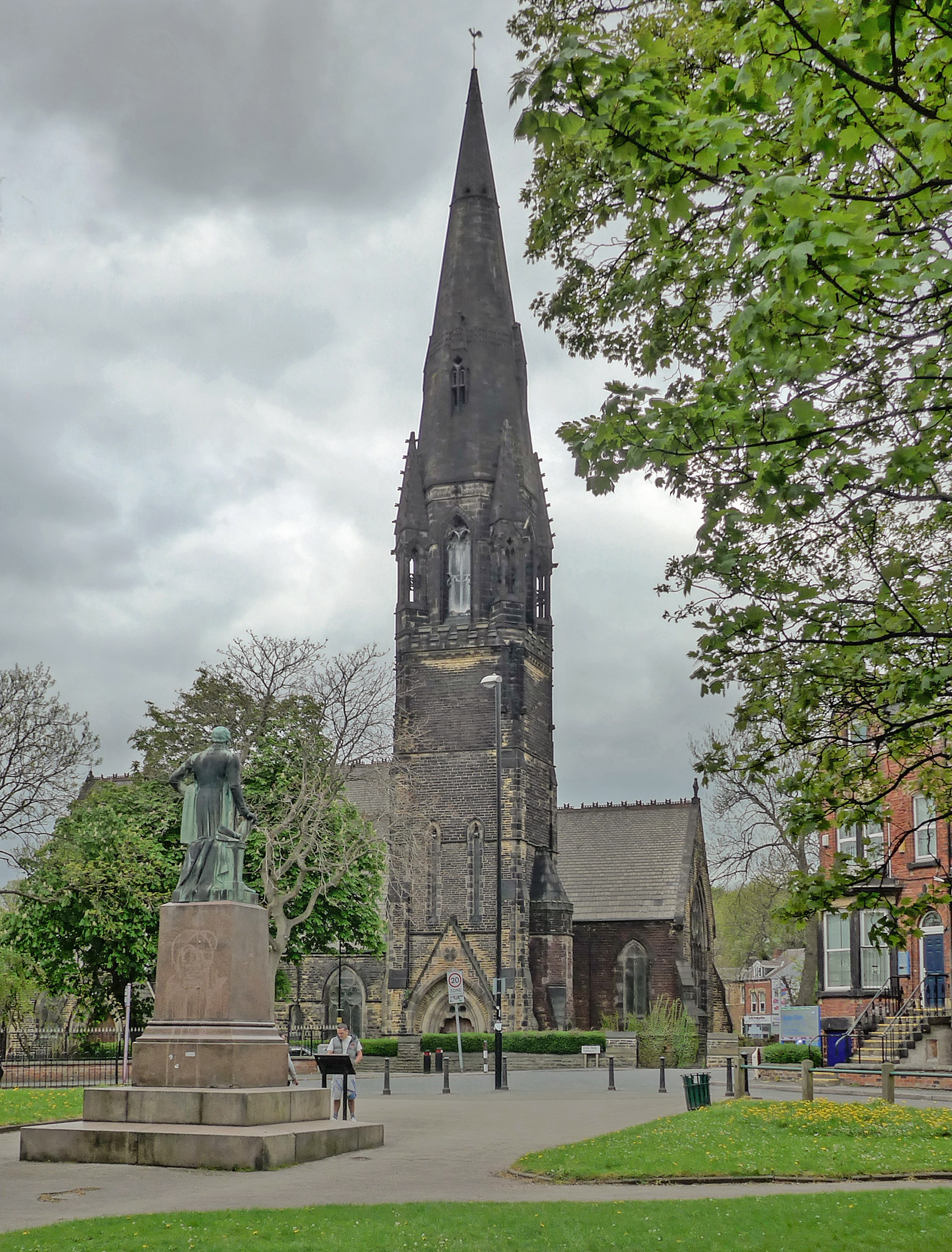
- St Augustine's from Woodhouse Moor
- St Augustine's, Wrangthorn
- 53.8146°N 1.5626°W
- Denomination: Church of England
- Website: www.wrangthorn.org.uk

History
- Founded: 1871
- Dedication: Augustine of Hippo

Architecture
- Functional status: Active
- Architect: James Barlow Fraser
- Style: Gothic Revival
- Completed: 1871

Specifications
- Height: 186 ft (57 m)
- Materials: Gritstone ashlar

Administration
- Province: York
- Diocese: Leeds
- Archdeaconry: Leeds
- Deanery: Headingley
- Parish: Woodhouse & Wrangthorn

Clergy
- Vicar: Adrian Smith

Listed Building – Grade II
- Designated: 5 August 1976
- Reference no.: 1255576

St Augustine's Church, Wrangthorn, usually referred to as simply Wrangthorn, is the church of the parish of Woodhouse and Wrangthorn, Leeds, West Yorkshire, England. It is near Hyde Park Corner at the north end of Woodhouse Moor. It shares a benefice and clergy with St George's Church in the city centre, although the parishes remain separate. It was paid for by the Leeds Church Extension Society in 1866 and completed in 1871. The church, which is a Grade II listed building is on a ridge of land between Meanwood Beck and the Aire Valley, on the north-west side of the city. Its architect, James Barlow Fraser (1835–1922), took advantage of this prominent location by including a three-stage pointed steeple; its blackened stone is a local landmark. The church is built in local gritstone ashlar in the Gothic Revival style and is adjoined by the smaller church hall of 1934.

Wrangthorn is an active Anglican parish church in the Diocese of Leeds, arranging services on Sundays, in addition to baptisms, weddings, and funerals. It is the venue for a variety of community events including music performances and practice, hospitality for the weekly Woodhouse Moor parkrun, and the annual June Project of volunteering within Hyde Park.

== History ==
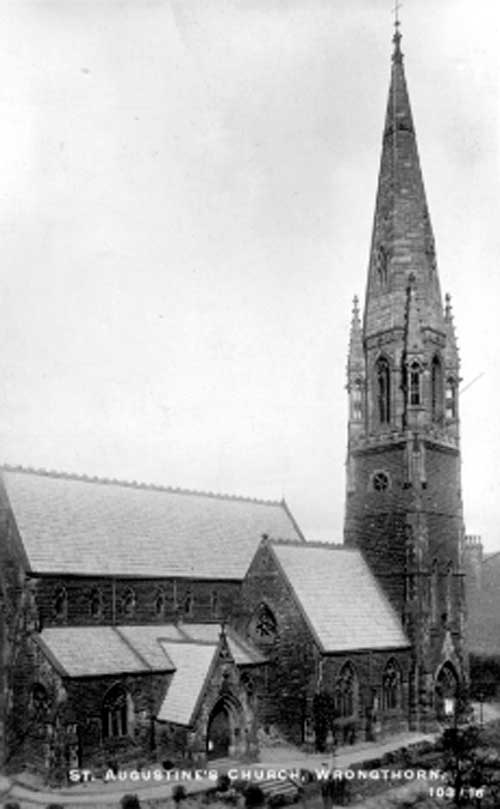
An old postcard showing the church after completion

Prior to its development as an area of dense housing in the mid 19th century, Hyde Park did not have an identity of its own and was part of the wider parish of Woodhouse and Wrangthorn. The name was given by a local landowner to confer a more prestigious image and encourage further development. In 1866, the Leeds Church Extension Society, which was founded two years earlier to help build churches and to pay for clergy in the rapidly expanding city, paid £1,000 for the site in Hyde Park Terrace. It was the first church to be endowed by the Society.

The Society provided temporary and movable iron churches, each with a capacity of 300, for communities to meet in while funds were raised for a permanent structure; this was open on the site by February 1867, with a Sunday school operating by August. It was at the eastern end of the current church. When no longer required, the iron churches were usually resold for a similar use on another site where they housed another congregation saving and raising money to build a more lasting structure.

The architect for the church of St Augustine was James Barlow Fraser of Leeds, who prepared the designs in 1869. A foundation stone laying ceremony was held in December 1869 by the Vicar of Leeds, Canon Woodford. During the ceremony the ropes holding the stone gave way in the damp weather and he only narrowly avoided serious injury. The money needed for the church had been raised through collections and a bazaar. It was mostly constructed during 1870-71 - the general contractor was Thomas Whiteley and a number of smaller firms such as Messrs. Heaps and Robinson sub-contracted to provide ironmongery and other similar items - and was ready to be consecrated by 8 November 1871, having cost about £8,500 (equivalent to £866,000 in 2025).

The spire, which is 186 ft (57 m) high, was the last phase of the main structure, being completed in March 1878. It has a single bell cast by Thomas Hilton of Wath, hung for ringing though now supported on timbers and rigged up for chiming. This bell was formerly at St Michael and All Angels, East Ardsley and is assumed to have been transferred here when eight new bells were installed at East Ardsley in 1883.

The church's seating capacity was 650, a target set by the Extension Society in 1866 as one quarter of the population of the parish. They were all needed as over the next 30 years that population quadrupled to an estimated 10,000. In the 1970s, some of the pews at the front and rear were removed for music groups and disabled access. The church had a large choir, athletics, cricket, and football teams and uniformed organisations. The church also had its own school of 1865 at the corner of Cliff Road and Cross Cliff Road, now residential apartments.

St Augustine's Church is recorded in the National Heritage List for England as a Grade II listed building, having been designated on 5 August 1976. Grade II is the lowest of the three grades of listing, and is applied to "buildings that are nationally important and of special interest".

The present church hall was built in 1934 over part of the churchyard and is not linked to the church. This building was built using funds raised for a stained glass west window, but this remains plain glass with the church hall now established as a community facility.

A Roman Catholic church building of 1936 in Harehills shares the name of St Augustine's, so to avoid confusion Wrangthorn (the name of the parish) is often used to refer to the church. For many years, the parish had two churches: St Augustine's and St Mark's; in 2001, the decision was taken to close St Mark's Church.

== Description ==
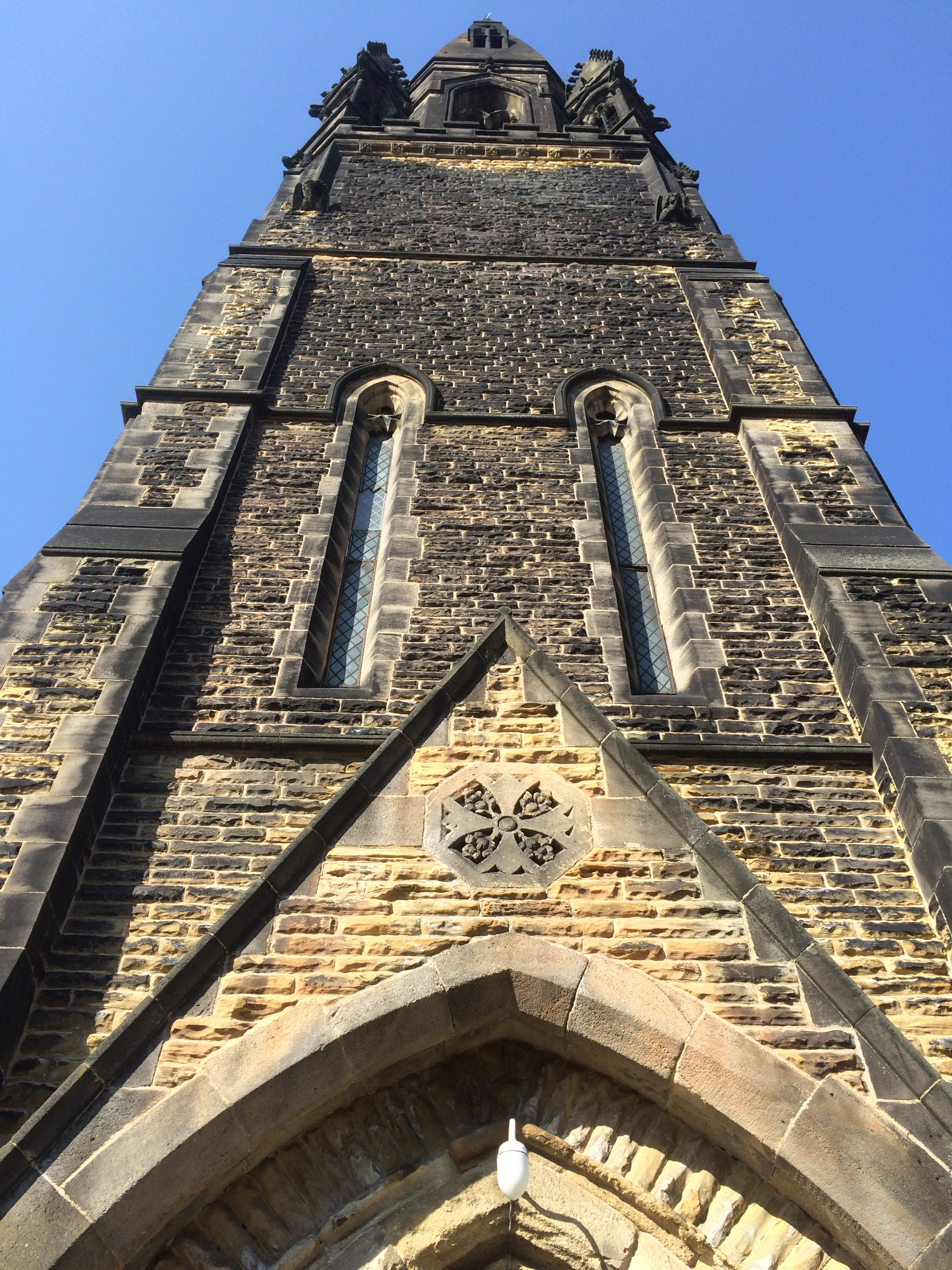
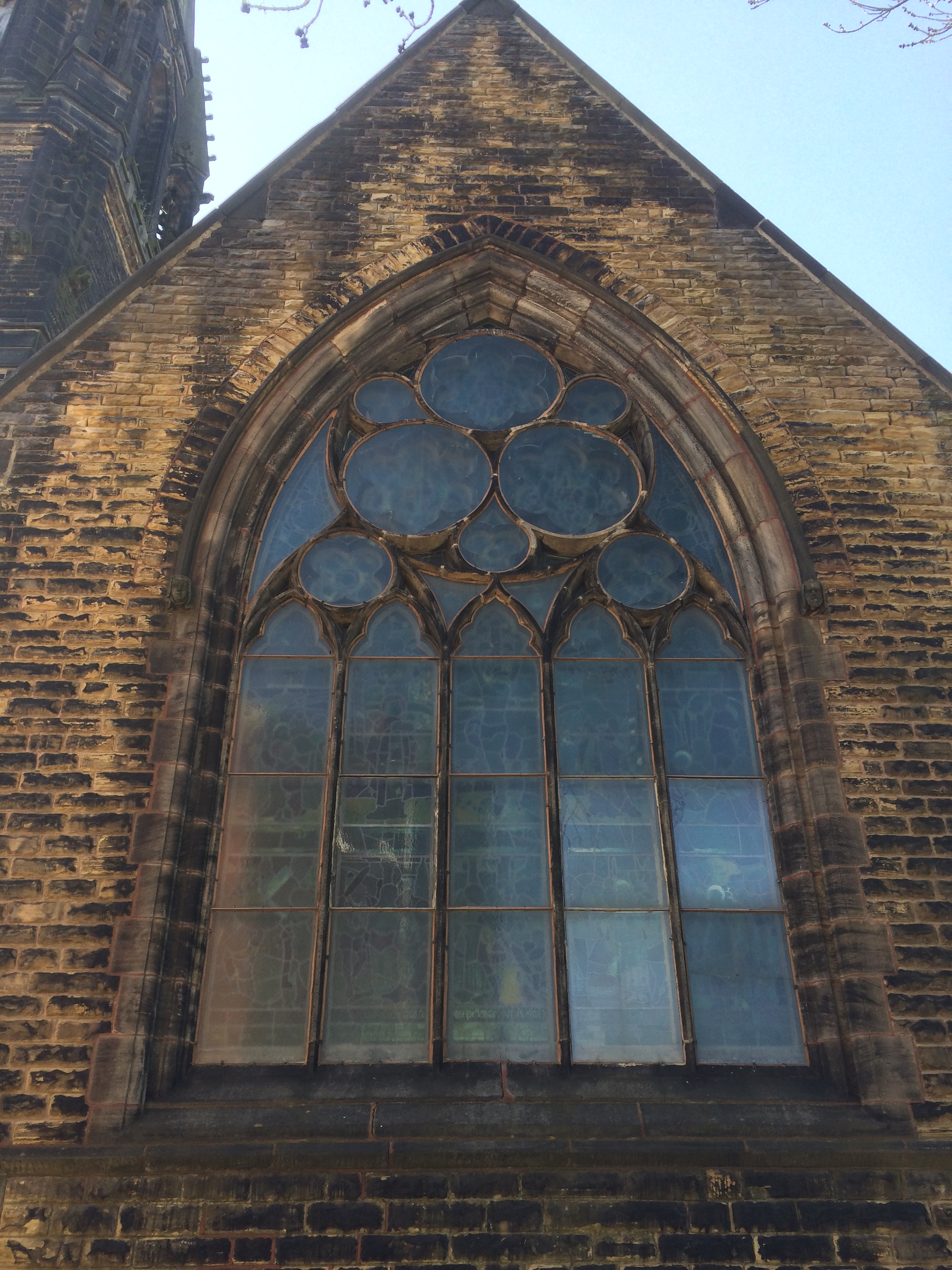
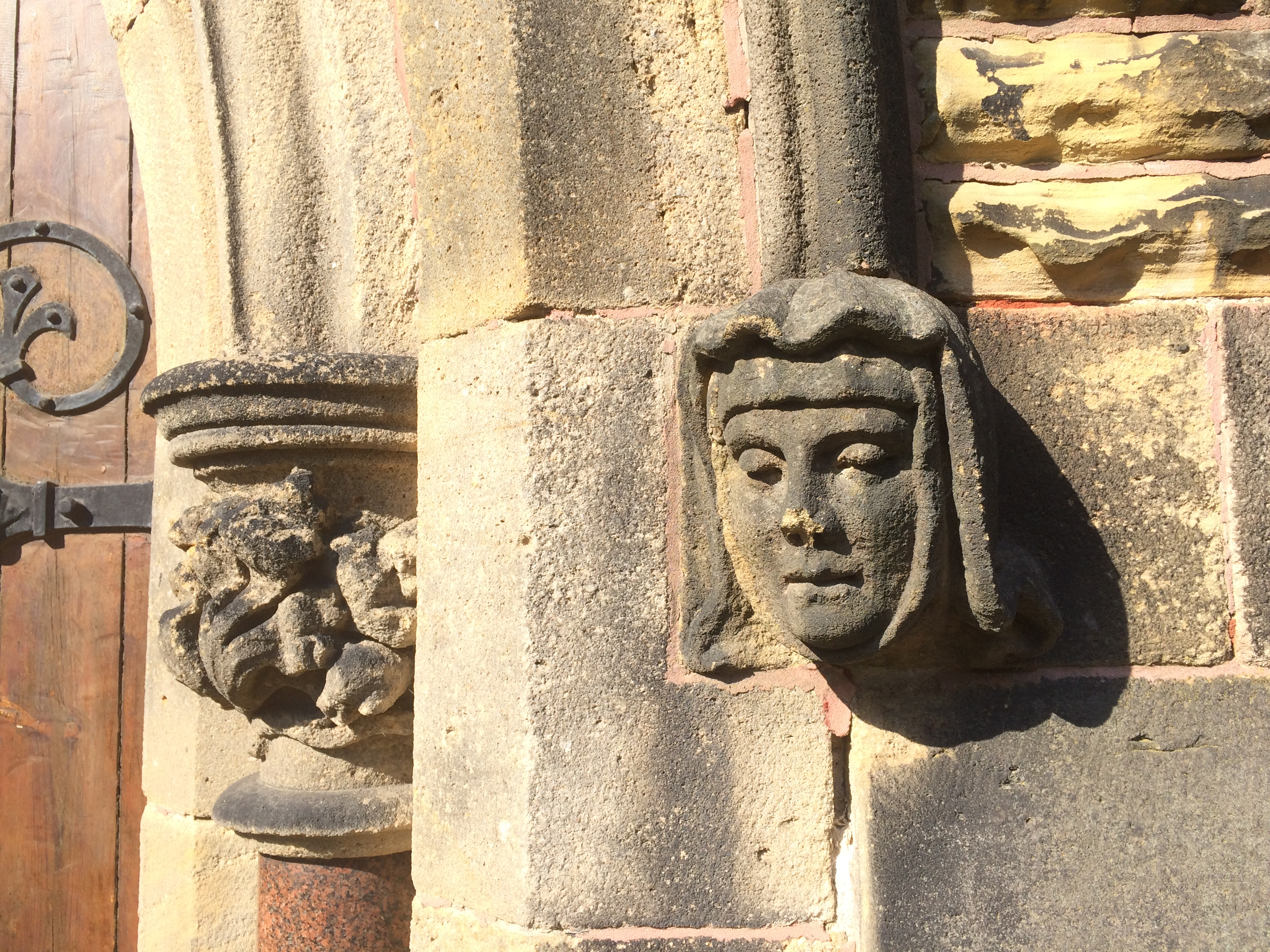
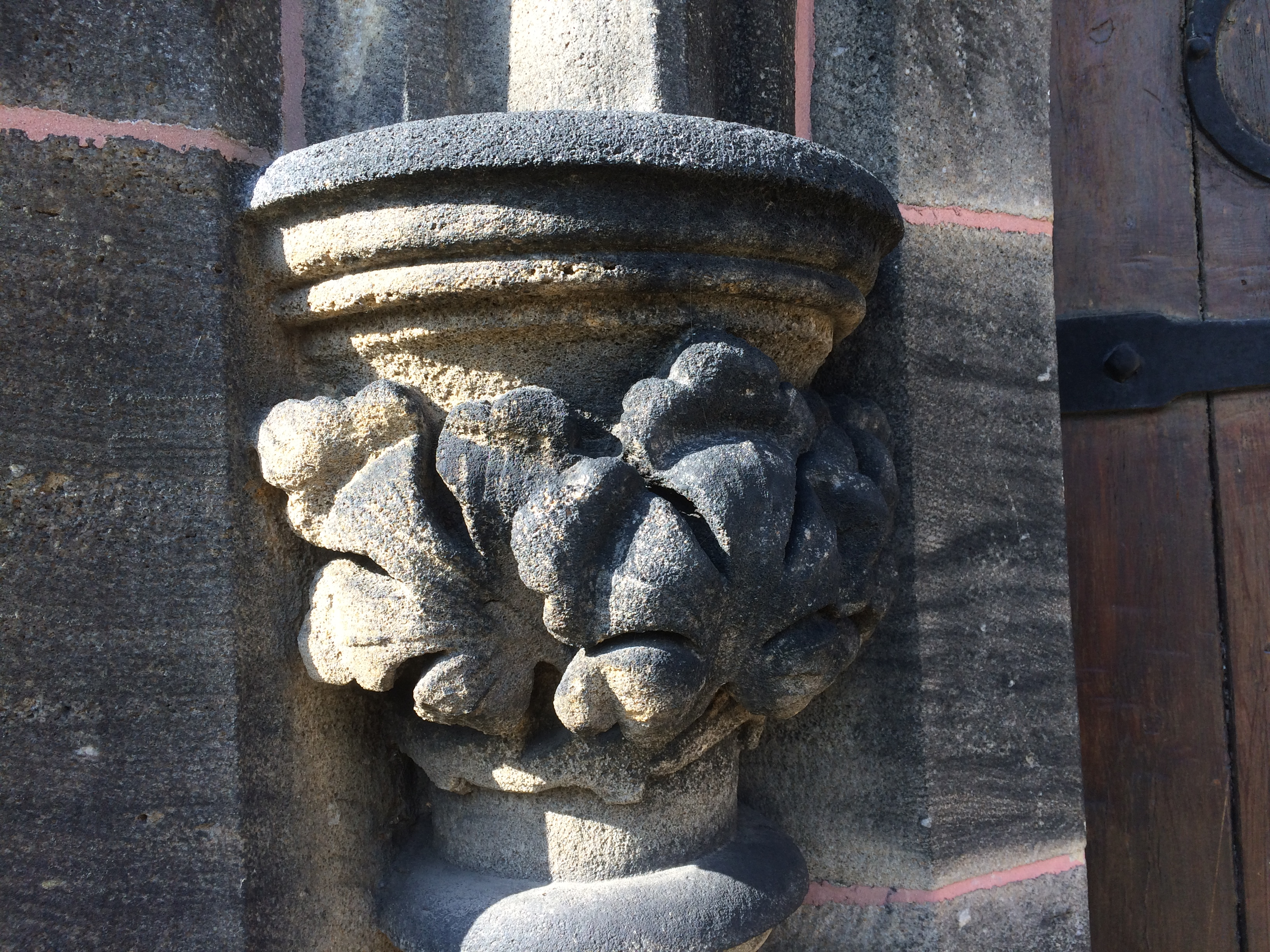
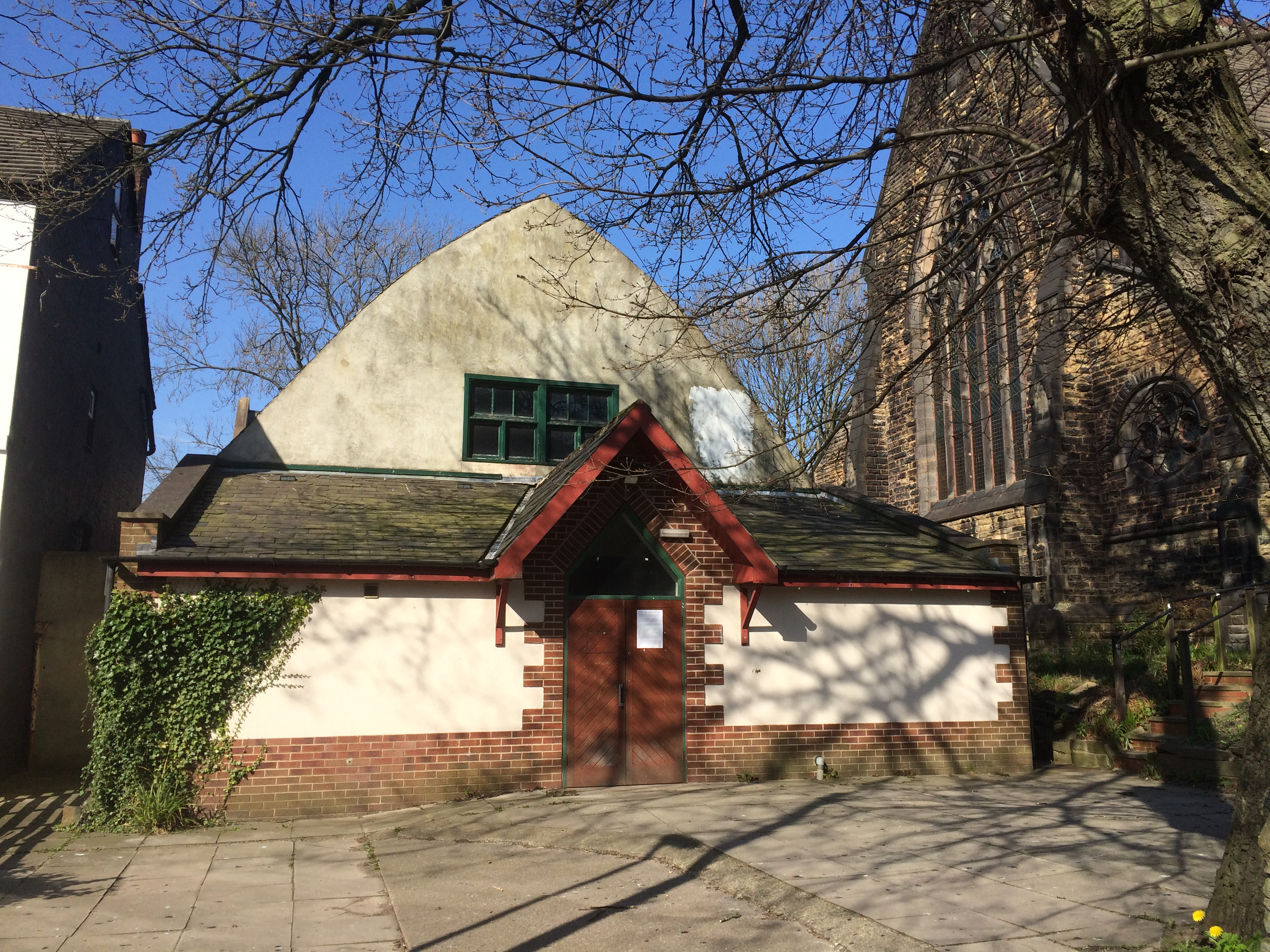
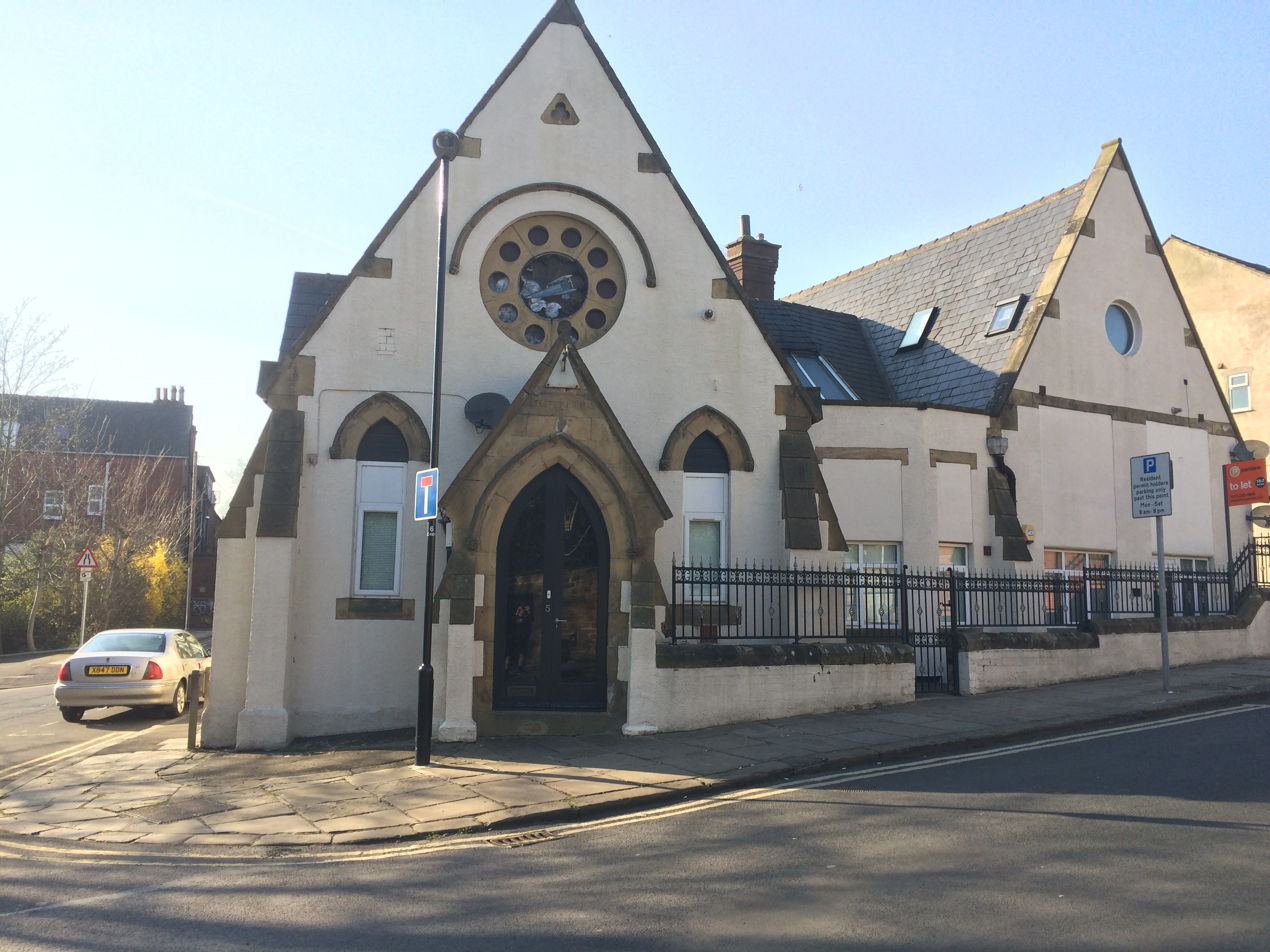
Clockwise from top left: detail of entrance and tower, east window, foliate capital, former school, church hall, and entrance carvings

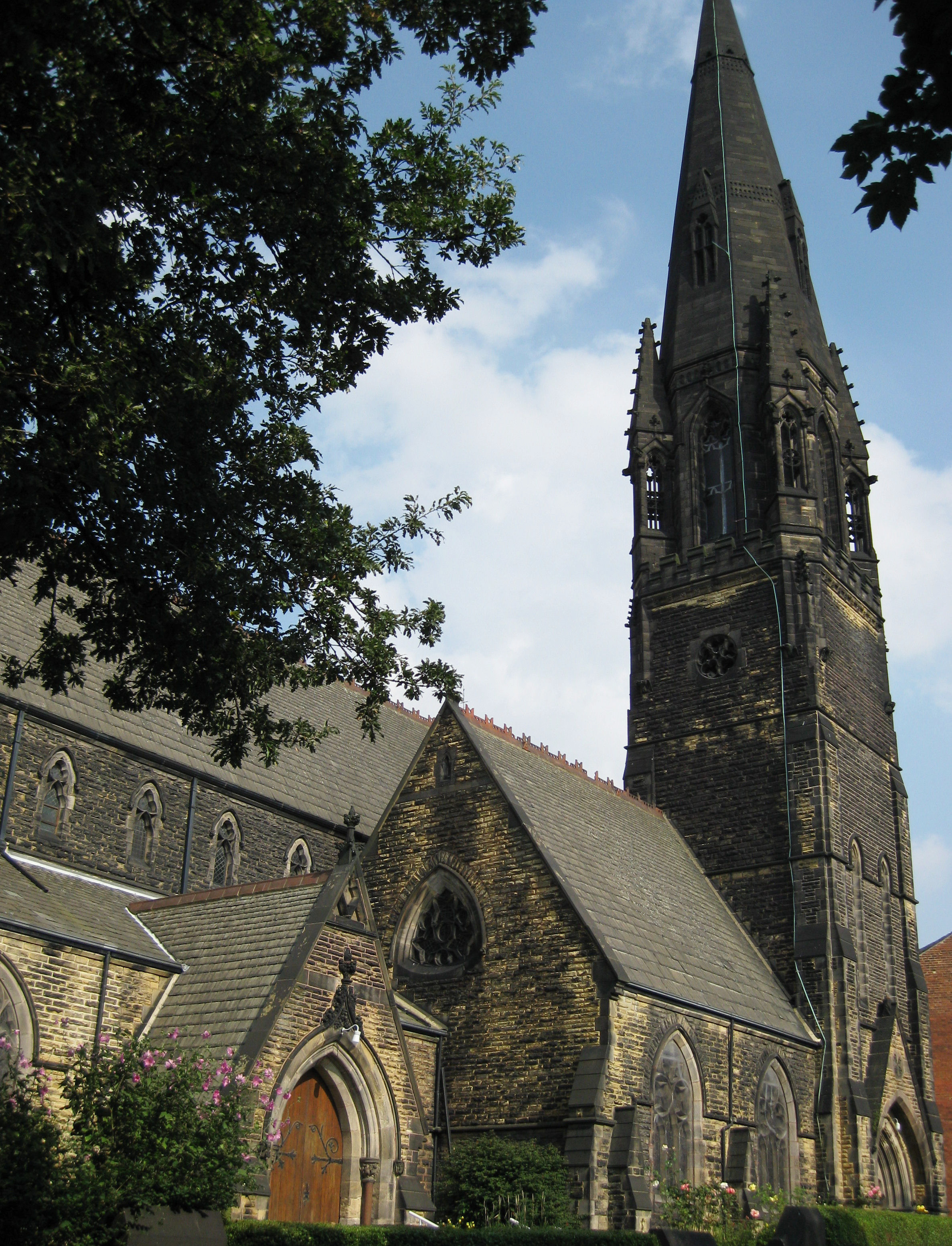
A 2008 view from Hyde Park Terrace, including entrances and severely blackened tower

Externally, the church is constructed in rock-faced gritstone, with ashlar details and a pitched slate roof. The building was designed by local architect James Fraser and is in the Gothic Revival style. Though blackened by pollution damage, the exterior is noted for a tall southeastern tower of three stages, with shallow corner buttresses, a pair of lancet windows and carved corbels in the form of angels and grotesques, with an octagonal bell stage, surmounted by a tall stone spire, considered to be a significant local landmark.

The elegant Victorian interior is a five-bay nave with a floor of red and black tiles, polished marble columns, foliate capitals and chamfered pointed arches. This space is illuminated by electric light fittings with central orb and pendant bulbs with stylised leaf motifs. Seating space is in the form of low original pews with umbrella holders. There are two-bay transepts and a three-bay chancel. The pulpit is constructed of inlaid marble on square and cylindrical squat columns, decorated with elaborate mosaics on three sides, including one of a comparatively rare image of a pelican.

The chancel arch is supported by short black marble shafts and has a painted vaulted wooden ceiling, most notably but subtly decorated with a crown of thorns. The reredos is of pink-veined marble in the Gothic Revival style and has a central mosaic depicting the Last Supper, in memory of members of Fraser's family. Above this, the east window is made up of highly decorative stained glass, depicting scenes from the life of Christ. A small statue depicts Augustine of Hippo, an early church father and bishop to whom the church is dedicated. Both the north and south transepts have decorative stained glass windows, and the church also houses some stained glass from the demolished St Michael's Church, Buslingthorpe, and the original altar from St Mark's. There is a font, made up of an octagonal bowl, featuring ornately carved stonework. The font, which was a gift from the architect, has a rare gilded boss pulley balance lid. There is a memorial dedicated to the victims of both world wars.

The church is surrounded by gardens, which are maintained by a team of volunteers, but there is no graveyard.

=== Organ ===
A previous organ was originally installed by the prolific organ builder Henry Bevington. The stop-list of the Bevington organ was for a 3-manual and pedal organ and was quite ambitious for an English local parish church in the mid-19th century. In the early 20th century, it was replaced by the present organ, also a 3-manual and pedal organ, built by the Leeds firm of Abbott and Smith, which had its factory on Blackman Lane and a good reputation for the sound and construction of its organs. The stop-list of the present organ is very similar, although not identical, to that of the Bevington organ, so much of the present pipework may be from the earlier instrument, although this has never been confirmed.

Originally, the console was under the pipework on the south side of the choir stalls but at some point the organ was rebuilt with a detached console behind the north choir stalls and recessed into the choir vestry. There are 43 stops distributed over the 3 manuals and pedals; 32 are sound-producing stops, the rest being couplers and tremulants. There are just short of 2000 pipes, varying in length from 15 ft (4.6 m) to about 1.5 in (3.8 cm). A specification of the organ can be found on the National Pipe Organ Register.

== See also ==
- Listed buildings in Leeds (Hyde Park and Woodhouse)
