= St George's Church, Leeds =

St George's Church
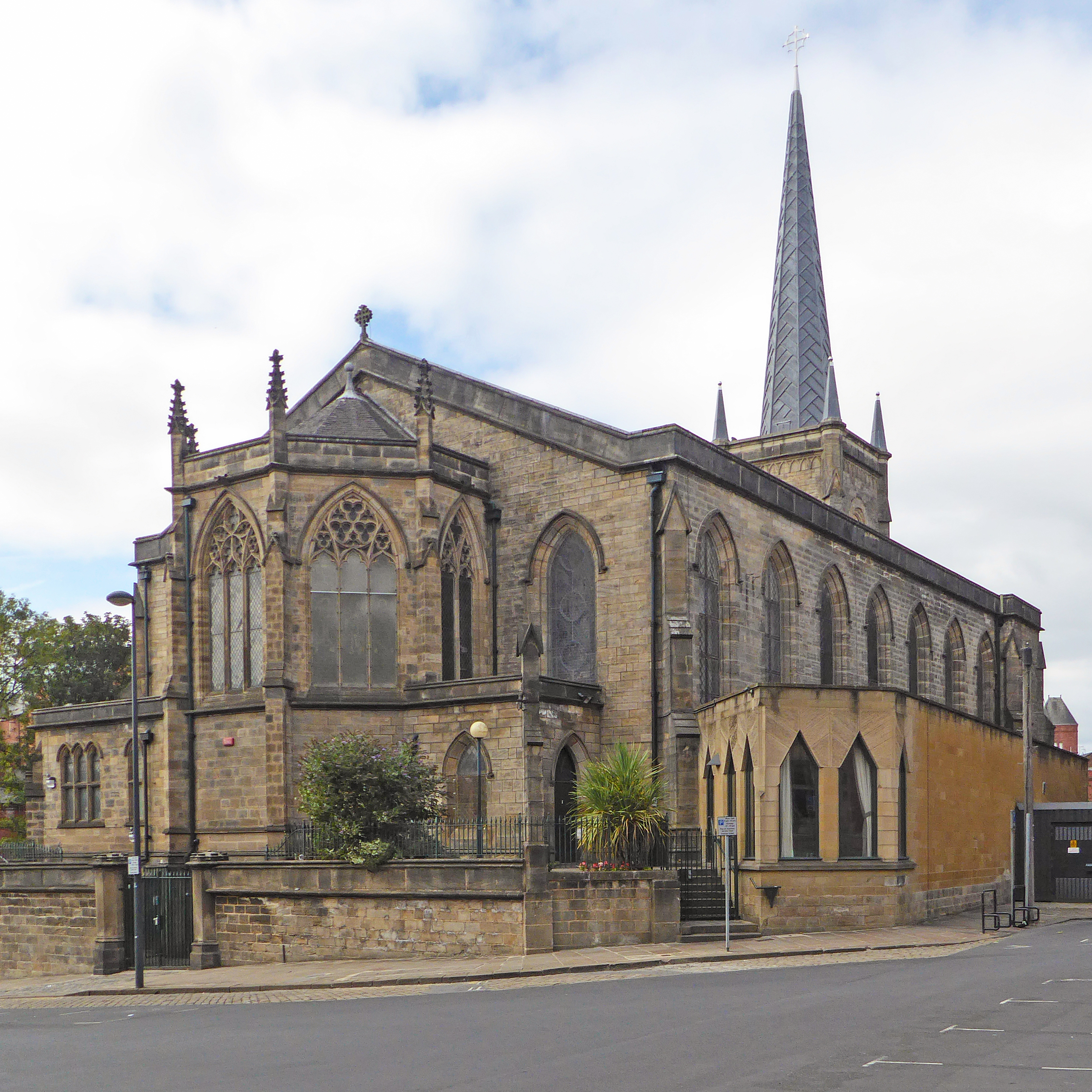
- St George's Church
- 53.8015°N 1.5532°W
- OS grid reference: SE 29517 34008
- Location: Leeds, West Yorkshire
- Country: England
- Denomination: Church of England
- Churchmanship: Charismatic Evangelical
- Website: stgs.org.uk

Administration
- Province: Province of York
- Diocese: Diocese of Leeds
- Deanery: Benefice of Headingley
- Parish: Leeds St George Team Ministry

Clergy
- Rector: Lizzy Woolf , Eve Ridgeway, Adrian Smith.

St George's Church, Leeds is a Church of England parish church in the centre of Leeds, West Yorkshire, England. The church building is near to Leeds General Infirmary. It is a church in the Deanery of North West Leeds. Although based in the city centre, the congregation is drawn from all parts of the city, including some student congregation.

The current staff team includes the rector Lizzy Woolf, associate rectors Eve Ridgeway and Adrian Smith.

== Services ==
Regular services at St George's occur at 10:30 am and 6:30 pm on Sundays with other activities throughout the week. The 10:30 am service is a large family congregation, with provision for children's ministry. The 6:30 pm service is a congregation aimed at students and young professionals, with a focus on biblical teaching and musical worship. St George's sets itself firmly within the Charismatic Evangelical wing of the Church of England. The other church in the parish of St George from 2021 is Holy Trinity Boar Lane which will be reopened a new ministry focused on weekdays city centre workers. St George's clergy also lead St Augustine's Church, Wrangthorn in the parish of Woodhouse and Wrangthorn through a shared benefice, where there is a particular focus on drawing a larger congregation from the large student population in the area. St George's is a resource church, tasked with growing the congregation at other churches by sending teams to plant churches. St Paul’s Ireland Wood had a team of 48 sent from St George's in January 2018 and small teams were also sent to St Paul’s Shadwell and St Peter’s Morley; there is a further plant is commencing at Bramhope St Giles from 2022.

== St George's Crypt ==
St George's Church is known for originally founding the St George's Crypt charity, which works with homeless people and asylum seekers. The Crypt provides overnight accommodation and runs two hostels as well as charity shops, events and programmes to help people deal with addiction.

The Crypt is now a charity in its own right, separate from St George's Church; although they still work closely together. The Crypt has its own chaplain, who as of 2026 was Revd. Andy Muckle.

== Church building ==
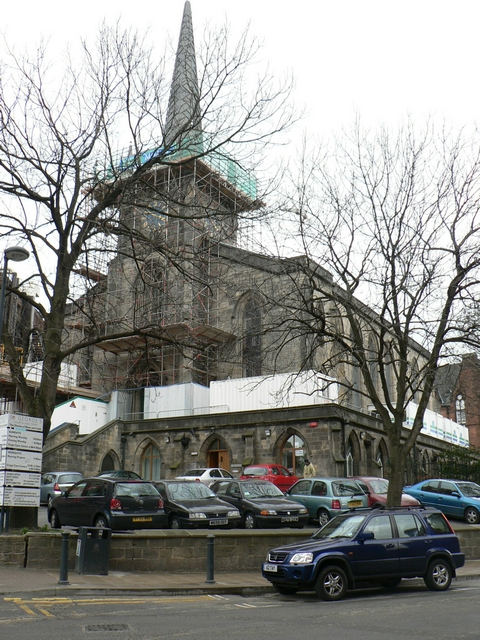
The replacement spire being erected, April 2006

The church is a Grade II listed building, built in 1836–1838. Its spire was blown down in 1962 and replaced in January 2006.

== Key dates ==
1836 A scheme was outlined for a new church to be built at the West end of the city. Money was raised for the building and a local architect, John Clark was instructed to draw up plans for a church of 'plain, bold style, free from ornaments'. As such, the design of the church comprised a nave and aisle under a timber roof, a clock tower, and a spire of 160 feet. The church was named St George's at the laying of the foundation stone by the then Bishop of Ripon, Charles Longley. At this stage, St George's was officially a chapel in the Parish of Leeds and remained so until 1868.

1836 Work started on the building. There was a slight delay as a decision was made to create burial vaults under the church as there was a general shortage of burial space in the city.

1837 The first curate, the Revd William Sinclair, an evangelical, was appointed and St George's became the leading evangelical church in the city. Since its opening, the reputation of St George's and that of its clergy, has been synonymous with evangelism. William Sinclair was officially known as a 'perpetual curate' of St George's because of the status of St George's within the Parish of Leeds.

1838 The church building was externally finished in April and was consecrated on 7 November of the same year. The total cost of the build was £11,000.

1839 A hurricane caused considerable damage to St George's and a rebuilding fund was set up. William Sinclair started St George's Day School.

1841 The painter Charles West Cope presented St George's with the sanctuary picture that is still in place today. Cope had been born in Park Square and had been approached by his friend John Atkinson, one of the trustees, to paint an altarpiece for the church.

1842 William Sinclair built St Andrew's (a chapel on Burley Road) as a memorial to his wife. This closed in 1958.

1847 He then built St Philip's near the site of the Yorkshire Post Building. This closed in 1931 when its Vicar died. The building was bought by the Roman Catholic Church and was demolished stone by stone and rebuilt in Middleton.

1855 The vaults and burial ground at St Georges were closed.

1857 John Blomfield was appointed to St George's. According to John Heaton, the son of one of the original Trustees, 'He was 'a small feeble-looking man' whose only gifts seemed to be the ability to preach evangelical sermons.

1868 St George's became a parish.

1873 Samuel Adams became vicar. It was he who bridged the gap between St George's Church and the parish church, thereby bringing a closer tie between the high and low church tradition in the city.

1880 Charles Lamb came to the church and was also appointed as chaplain to the adjacent Leeds Infirmary. When Charles Lamb left the church in 1887, the chaplaincy was taken over by Leeds Parish Church.

1881 A chapel, Emmanuel, was built to serve the northern end of the parish. This later housed the Anglican chaplaincy of the University of Leeds.

1882 By this time, three 'Day' schools as well as Sunday Schools had been established in the local area.

1886 Renovations were made to the church. A chancel was created to include the organ which was moved from its original location in the west gallery.

1887 Benjamin Lamb succeeded to the post of vicar.

1895 John Wright (later Archbishop of Sydney) - an "able evangelical" - appointed to St George's and successfully raised money for some much needed alterations and improvements to the church.

1900 The apse, chancel arch and vestry were added. A pulpit and choir stalls were also introduced. This cost a total of £9,000.00.

1904 Walter Green was appointed. Sunday schools and church organisations were thriving and church attendances were high.

1915 Arthur Alston was appointed.

1918 Bernard Herklots became vicar. He travelled widely and, in 1927, exchanged livings with a vicar in Dorset, Douglas Adams.

1927 Douglas Adams, having taken over as vicar, found himself faced with internal church squabbling, including differences over the church school. He organised the first Sunday school trip which went to Boston Spa. He also dedicated the memorial chapel at St Andrew's Church, Bruntcliffe, Morley, Leeds to those who had lost their lives in the First World War.

1930 Don Robins was appointed. The most renowned and longest lasting aspect of his work was the opening of the crypt beneath the church as a soup kitchen. At first, St George's Crypt was a refuge for men who had returned from the war and gravitated to Leeds in search of work but who ended up destitute. Since its inception, the crypt has offered support, advice and shelter to those people (men and women) on the margins of society and is still in existence today. Its work and its buildings have changed over the years to meet current demands and changes in society. Today, it is still a much respected Christian charity helping those with addiction and social exclusion problems.

1931 Robins initiated the opening of a women's centre which provided food, clothing and opportunities for day trips for the poor of the parish. He helped set up Fellowship House where servicemen posted to Leeds could meet. Monthly meetings for families of prisoners of war were held. War widows and their families were provided with food and clothing. Under Robins' leadership, church members were rallied to provide support for Estonians, Lithuanians and Latvians who had been brought to this country to work in the mills, and many of whom had been prisoners of war. Jobs were found for them and they eventually founded their own church.

1938 The Church School was thriving and an extension was built which also served as a church hall. The church flourished under Robins' leadership. There were Scouts, Guides, women's groups, men's groups and young people's groups. Parish residents were actively involved in the church, receiving and providing simultaneously. Robins was an influential person in the city and was widely respected by both clergy and lay people. When he died suddenly in 1948, clergy from great distances travelled to his funeral.

1948 Tony Waite was appointed vicar. He encouraged and developed the work of the crypt. He worked long hours and was a successor to Don Robins.

1954 Faith Lodge, an annex of St George's Crypt was opened with the aim of providing 'sustained care in the environment of a home'.

1958 Raymond Turvey succeeded Tony Waite and became well known for his sermons and Bible studies. As a result of reorganisation of parish boundaries, St Andrew's Church closed and St George's took over its school.

1962 On 11 February, only a few hours after a congregation of 400 had left the building, hurricane-force winds dislodged some of the pinnacles surrounding the church tower. These crashed through the roof of the church causing enormous structural damage, amounting to £20,000. The insurance for the church did not cover storm damage and there was a distinct possibility that the church might be closed. Throughout the week, the debris and destruction were cleared and the congregation met in the church on the following Sunday for worship. Within two weeks of the damage, £2,000 had been pledged towards the rebuilding costs: the rest came from sources all over the country and the world, including one large gift from Bridge Street Church in the City of Leeds. There building plans were drawn up by Peter Hill, the diocesan architect. He included a narthex, male and female toilets and two meeting rooms. The cost eventually came to £26,000 and this was met.

1972 Michael Botting became vicar with a brief to encourage more families to come to St George's. In this he succeeded and when he left in 1984, there were 25 babies in the crèche and over 100 young people in Sunday school each week and St George's was recognised as a family-friendly church. Botting initiated and pioneered family worship services. The number of students attending the evening services rose as well. During his ministry, the church school closed and its main building was demolished, but the church purchased the extension which became known affectionately as TAC (The Activities Centre). Sunday school and other church activities were held in TAC.

1976 Regent Terrace, another hostel of St George's Crypt, was opened.

1984–1986 A two-year vacancy between vicars.

1986 David Hawkins (later Bishop of Barking) was appointed vicar. His creativity, love of art, music, nature and the 'element of surprise' was evident in all aspects of his ministry, particularly in communicating the Gospel.

1989 Due to serious problems with the church building, Hawkins' creative gifts were greatly used in re-ordering the church to provide a 'flexible style, ideal for worship, conferences, concerts and theatre productions'. The re-ordering meant a two-year 'exile' from the building and the congregation worshipped in St Michael's School and Trinity St David's URC Church. At this time, David also instigated the development of the TAC site facility, finally completed in 2006.

1990 A church plant in the parish, known as St George's Community Church, was established.

1999 With the pressure to implement new health and safety regulations, and the need to update the facilities, a complete refurbishment of St George's crypt was undertaken.

1999 St George's became a team ministry. David Hawkins became rector and the community church was granted district church status with its own team vicar, Peter Ellem.

2002 David Hawkins left to become the Bishop of Barking. There followed a year's vacancy.

2003 Jonathan Clark was appointed as rector.

2006 The steeple, removed in 1962, was replaced.

2010 St George's Crypt reopens following a £15m refurbishment.

2021 St George's takes on responsibility for the City Centre Mission based at Holy Trinity Church, Leeds. St George's works in a team of three churches, along with Holy Trinity and St Augustine's Church, Wrangthorn.

== See also ==
- Listed buildings in Leeds (City and Hunslet Ward - northern area)
