= Ireland Wood =

Suburb in Leeds, West Yorkshire, England

Coordinates: 53.846°N 1.600°W

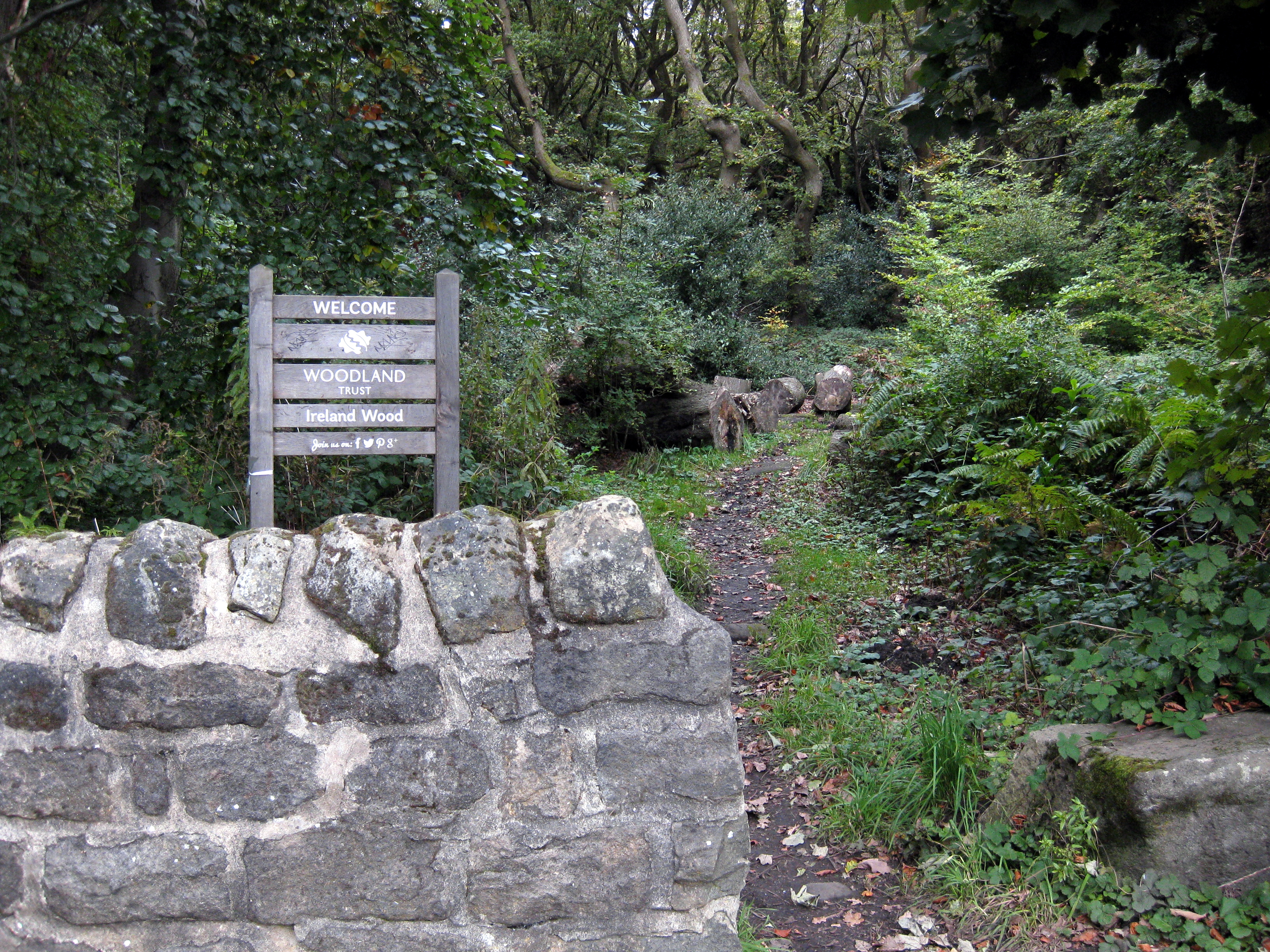
Entrance to woodland on Hospital Lane

Ireland Wood is a small residential area in north-west Leeds, West Yorkshire, England named after the Woodland Trust wood which it contains. It is approximately 4 miles (6.4 km) to the north-west of Leeds city centre. It was planned by the Leeds Housing Director, R. A. H. Livett, and won the Ministry Housing medal for 1945-9. An early plan of Ireland Wood in 1950 is shown on the Leodis website.

The estate was constructed throughout the 1950s and provided a refuge from the slum houses in industrial parts of the city which they (along with other similar areas) replaced. This estate is particularly leafy, due to the amount of greenery and woodland surrounding. The area's main thoroughfare is the Otley Old Road.

It sits in the Weetwood ward of Leeds City Council and Leeds North West parliamentary constituency.

The district is close to the Holt Park, Cookridge and Tinshill areas and the Leeds Ring Road.

== Housing ==
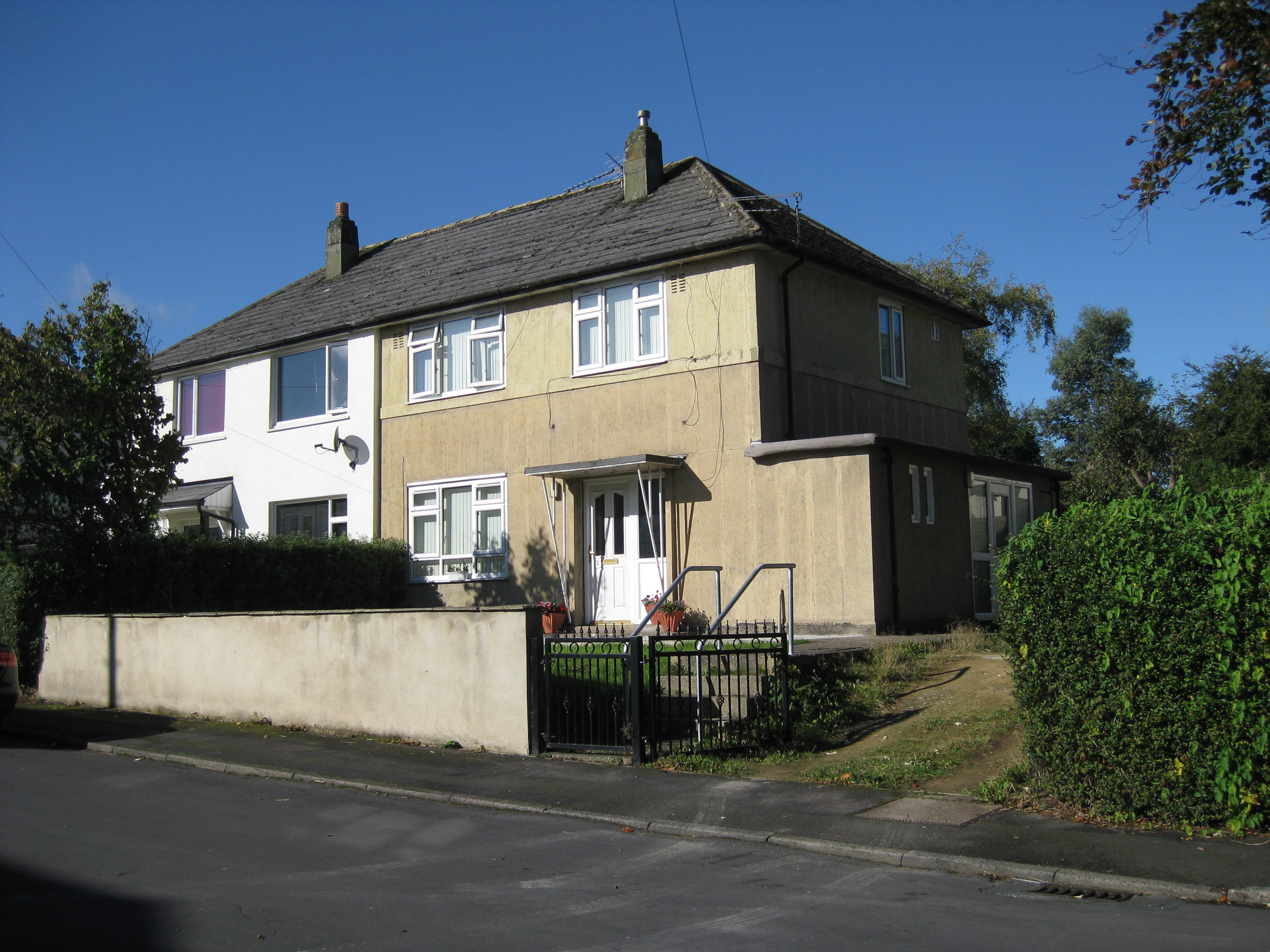
Typical concrete house, original finish on right

Most housing in Ireland Wood is late 1940s concrete, prefabricated housing. This stock is generally in a good condition and has been recently refurbished. There is one block of highrise flats, Beevers Court, situated on Iveson Approach. Most housing in the area is off yellow in colour, but as many houses in the area have been bought by their residents, some owners have painted their houses white. From late 2013 many council houses have seen a repaint, accompanied with new insulation.

Most housing on the estate comprises semi-detached properties with two or three bedrooms. Council housing on nearby estates such as Tinshill and Moor Grange is built with bricks, as opposed to being prefabricated, and so generally fetches a higher price on the property market.

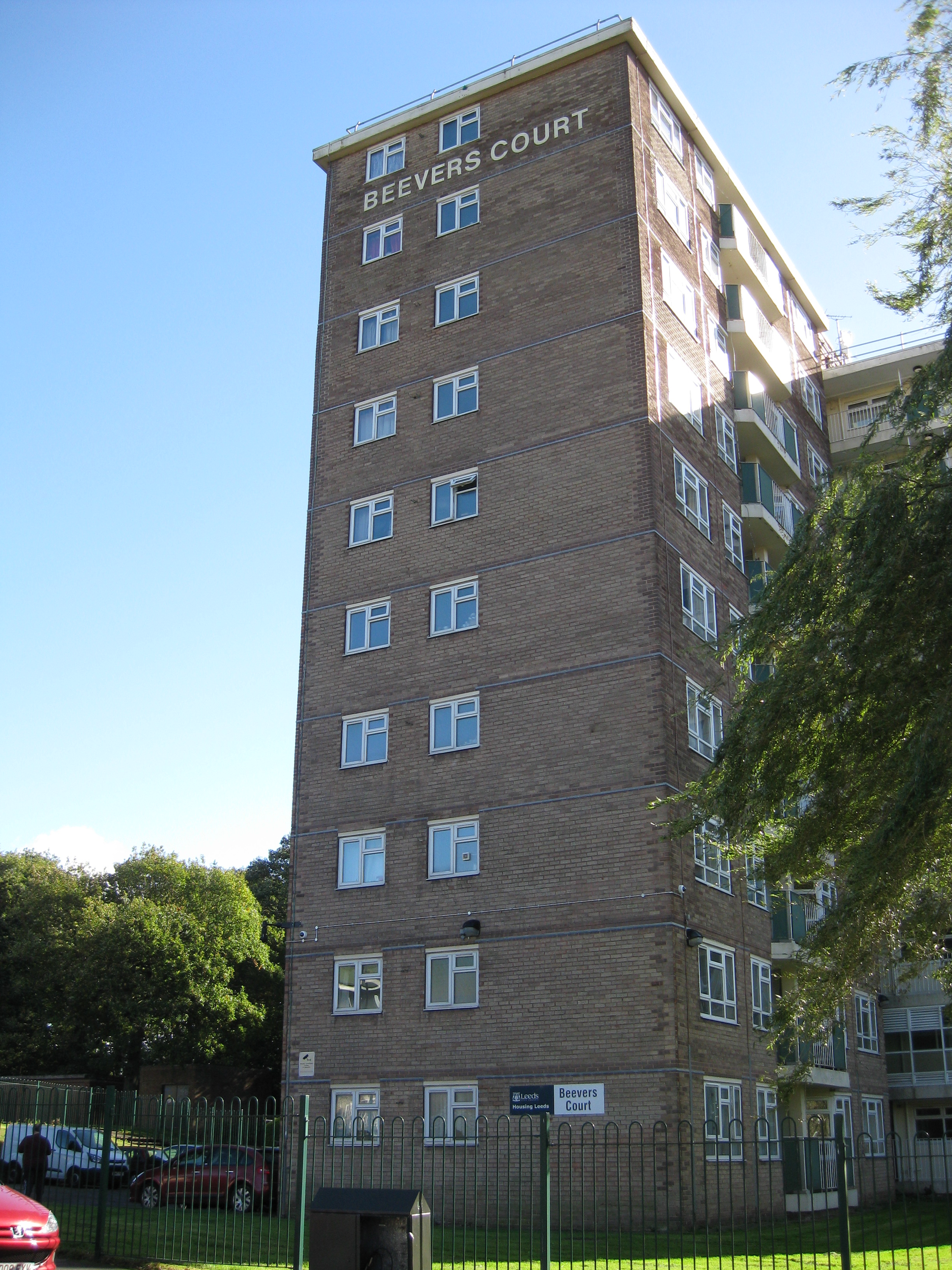
Beevers Court (flats)

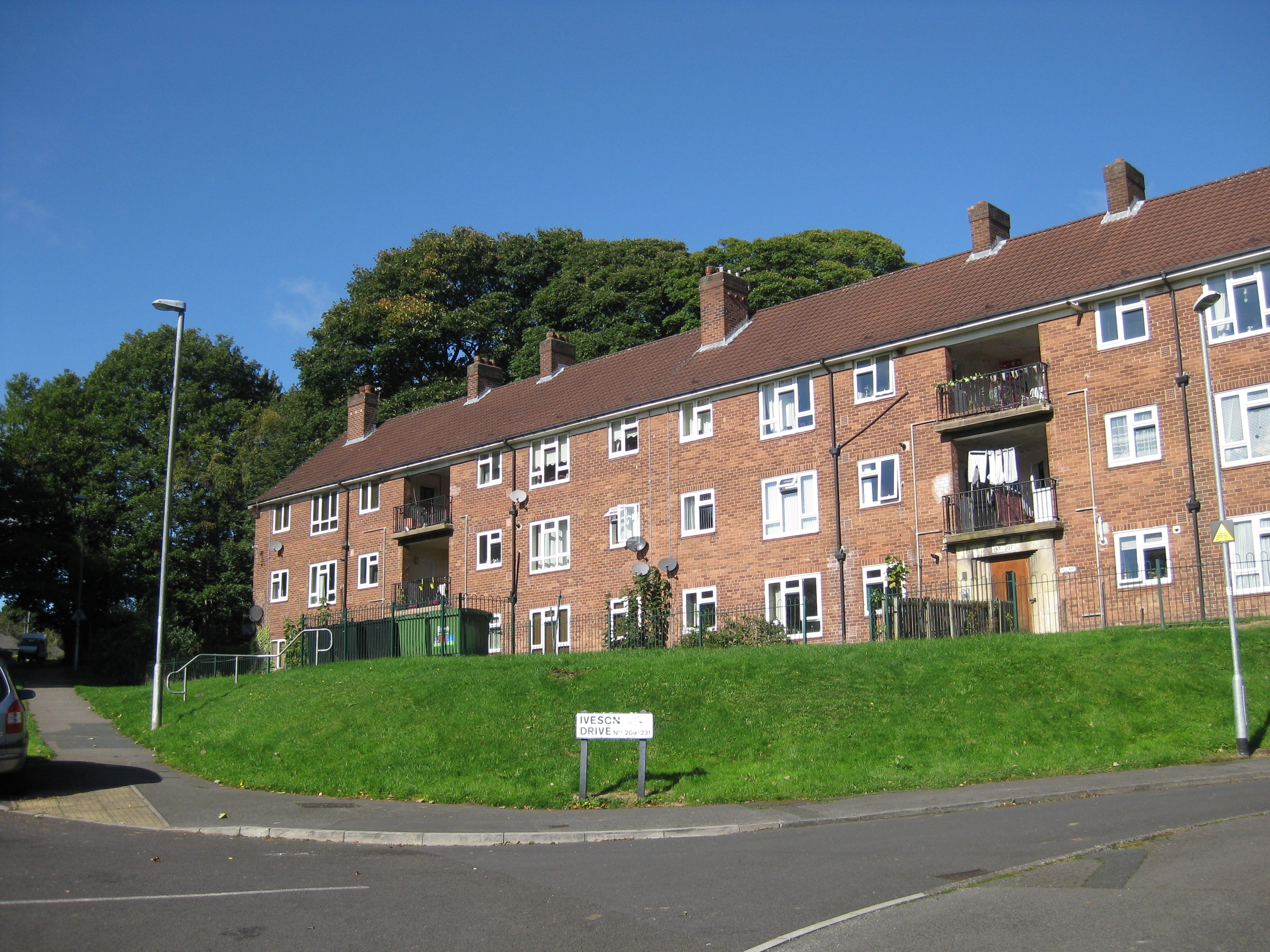
Low rise flats

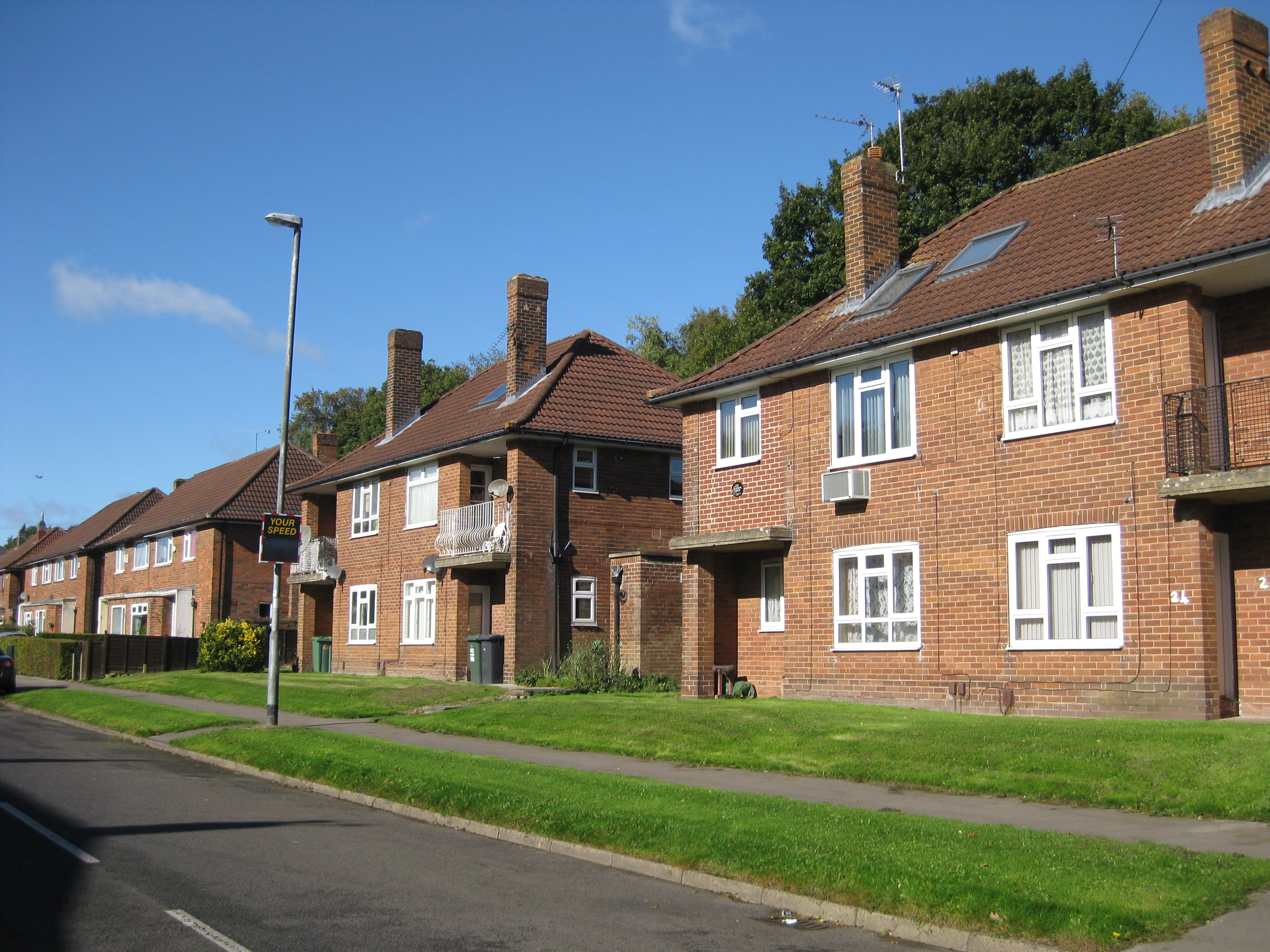
Brick houses and two-storey flats

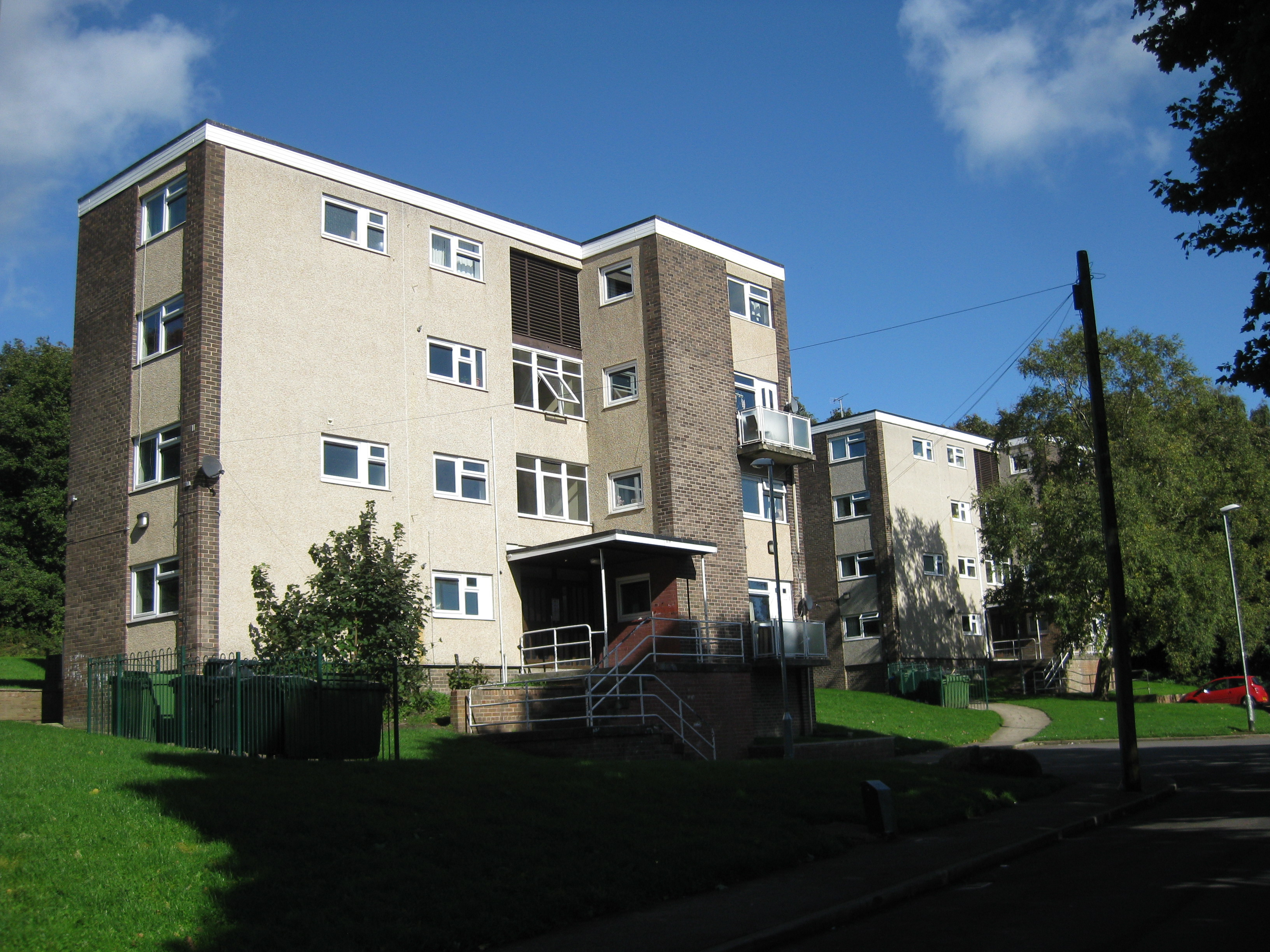
More recent flats

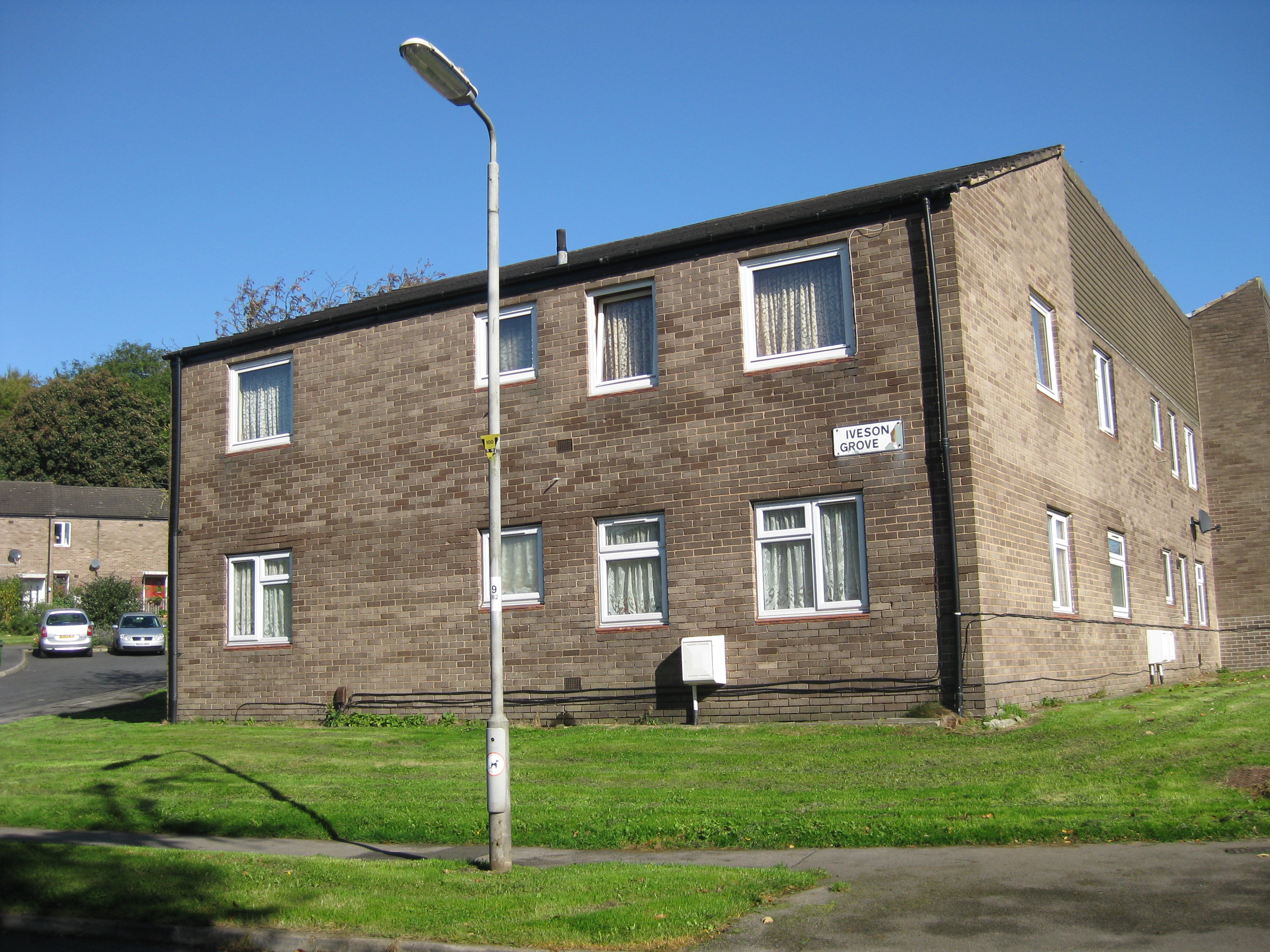
More recent flats

== Amenities ==
The area has Ireland Wood Surgery and Pharmacy, three schools, Iveson Primary School, Ireland Wood Primary School and a Catholic primary school called Holy Name School, as well as three parades of shops, the main one on Iveson Approach next to the Beever's Court Flats, one on Otley Old Road and a further parade on Raynel Approach which contains Kidz in Kampz charity shop, Best-One Convenience Store and the hair, tanning and beauty salon 'LS Sixteen'. The row of shops on Otley Old Road contains Ireland Wood Post Office. Holy Name Church (Roman Catholic) and St Paul's (Church of England) are both situated on Otley Old Road, the latter at its junction with Raynel Drive. St Paul's Church is octagonal in form and its construction was funded by the Leeds Church Extension Society.

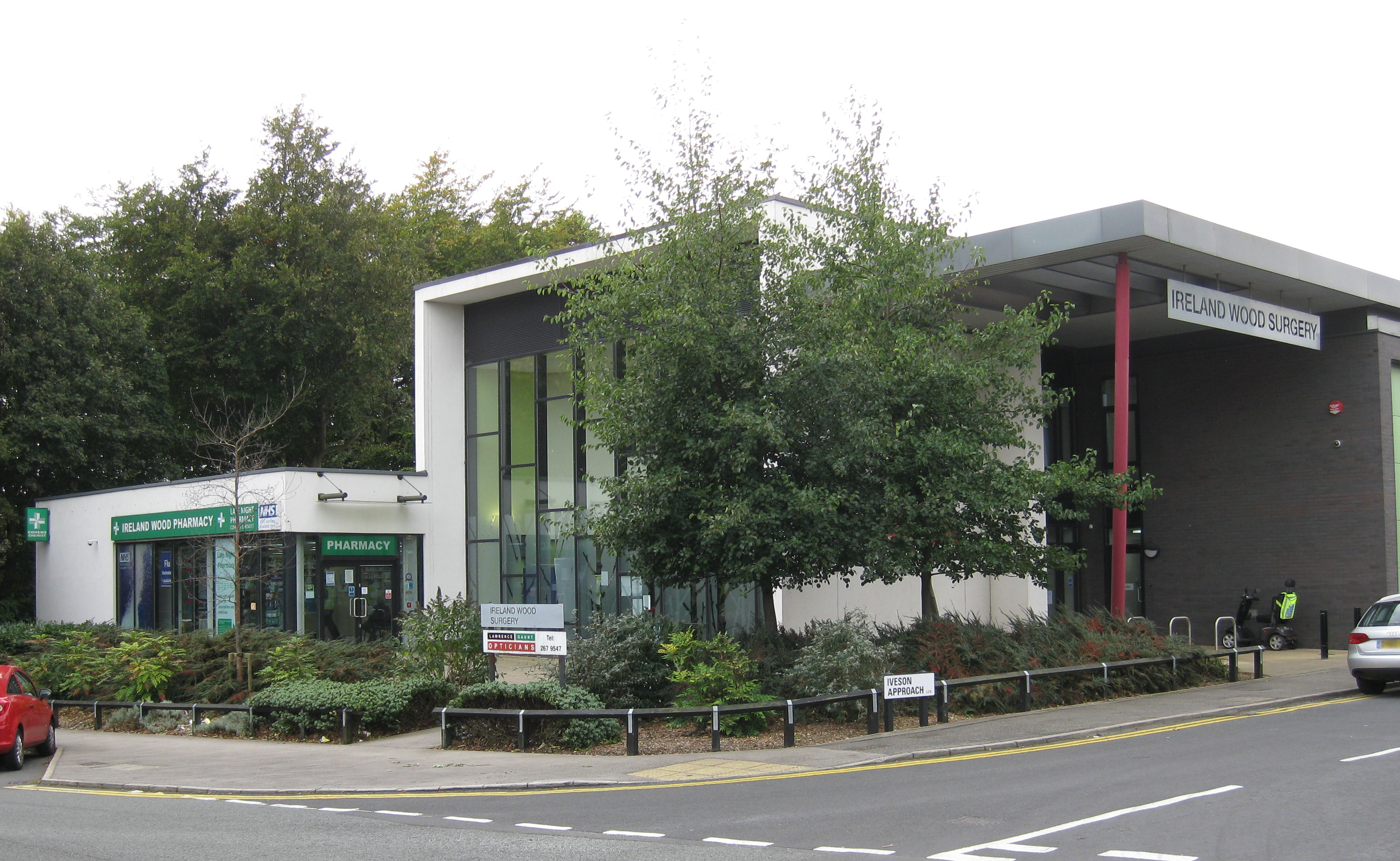
Surgery and Pharmacy

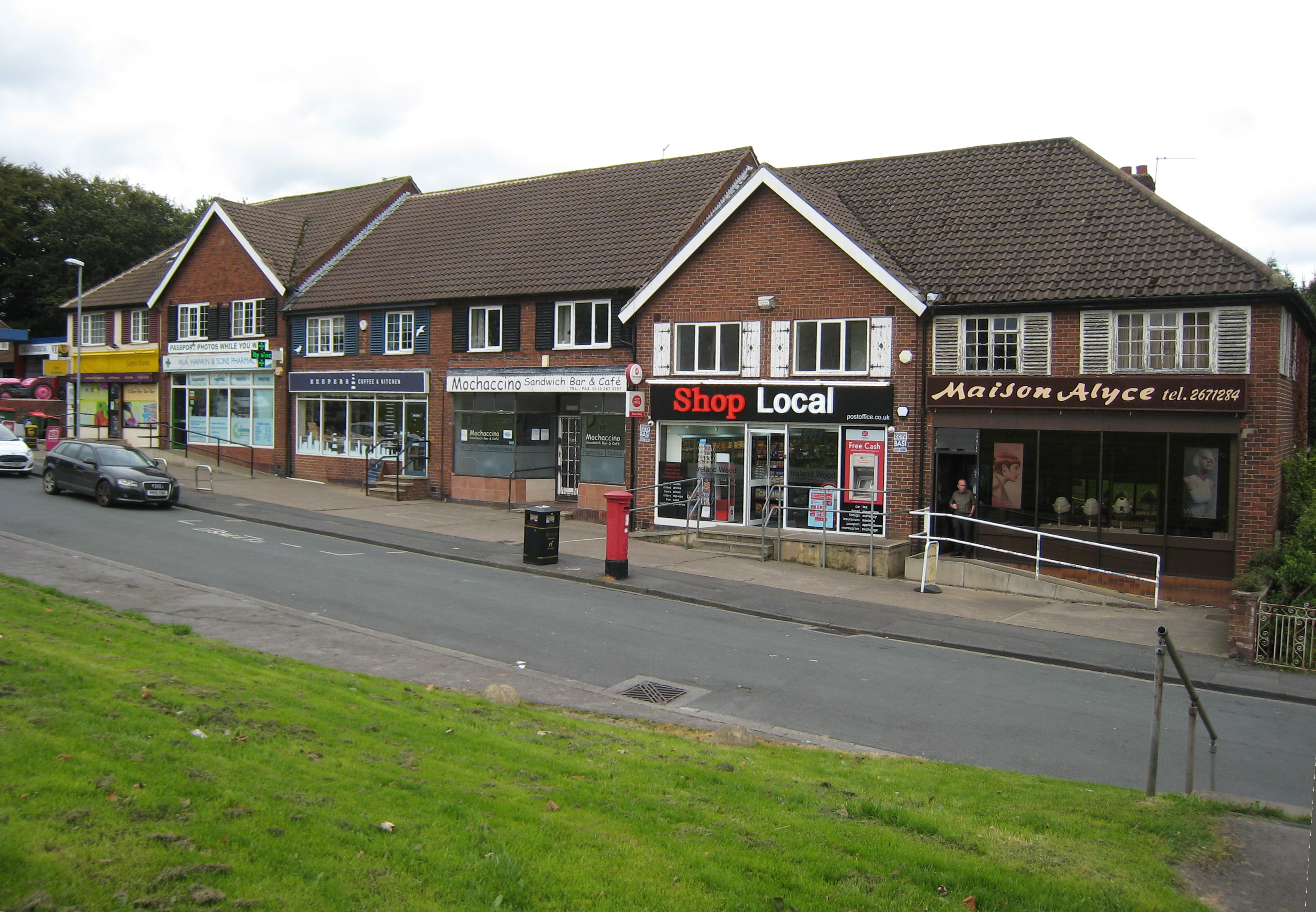
Post Office and shops on Otley Old Road

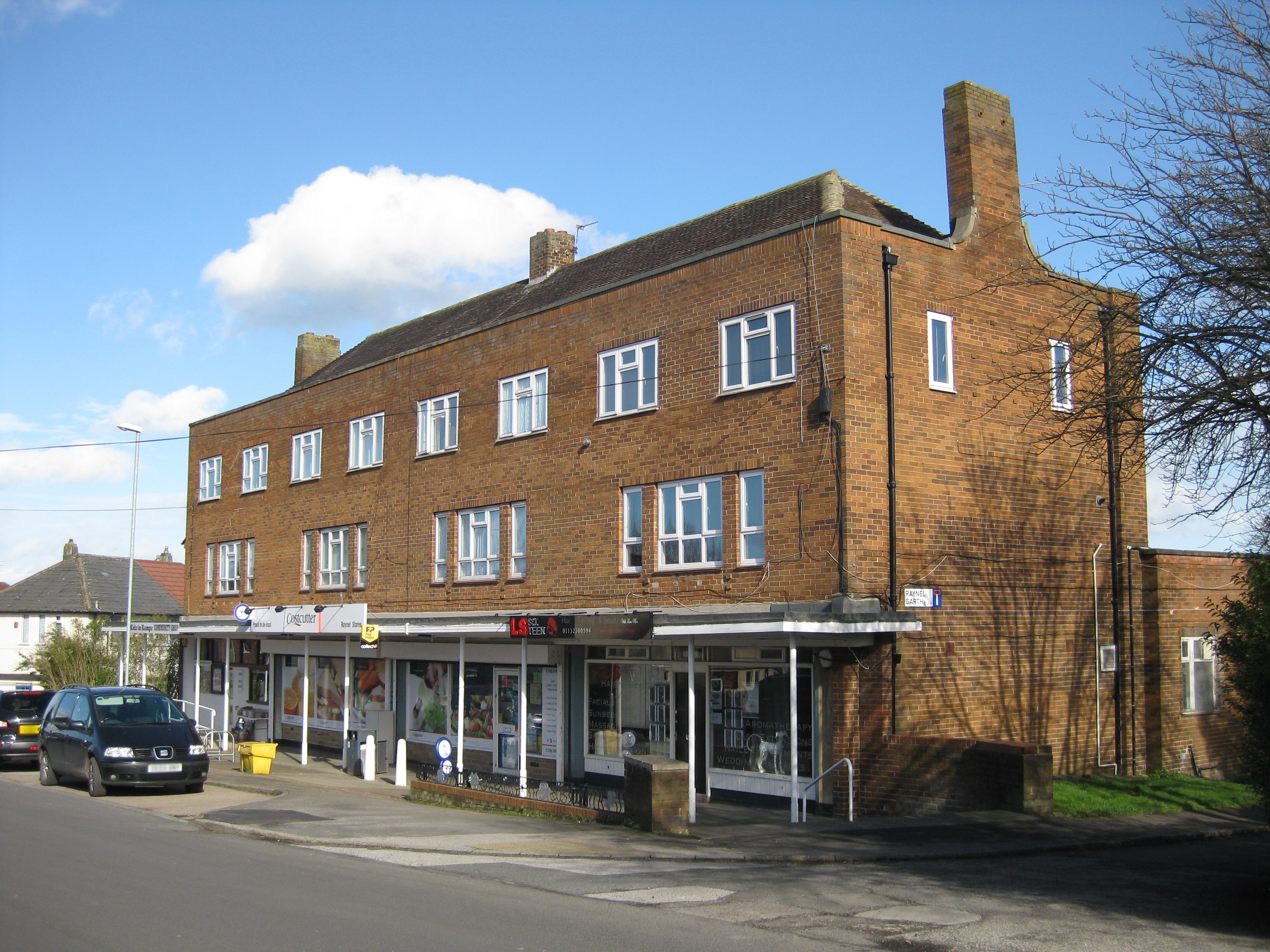
Shops on Raynel Approach

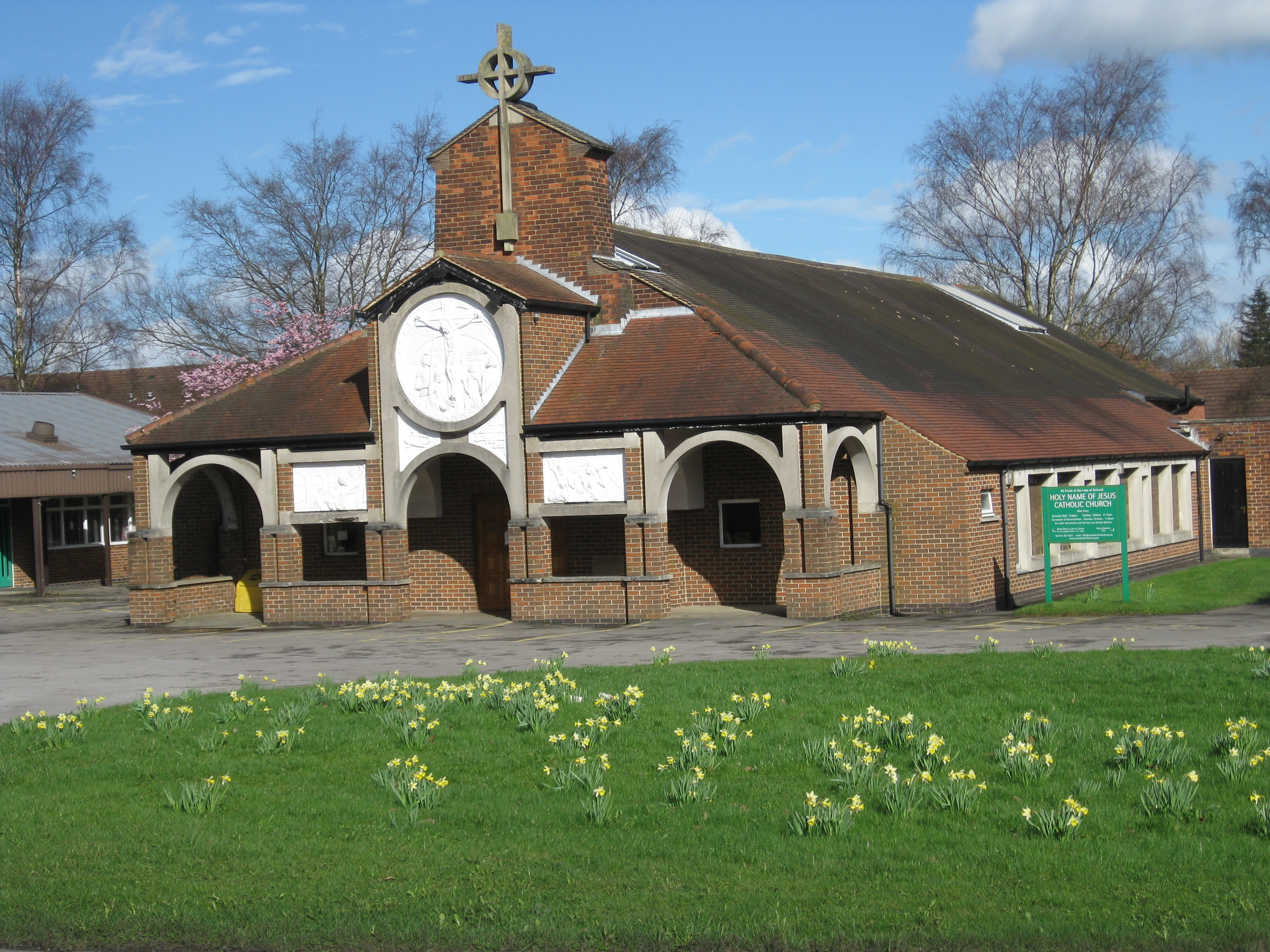
Holy Name of Jesus church

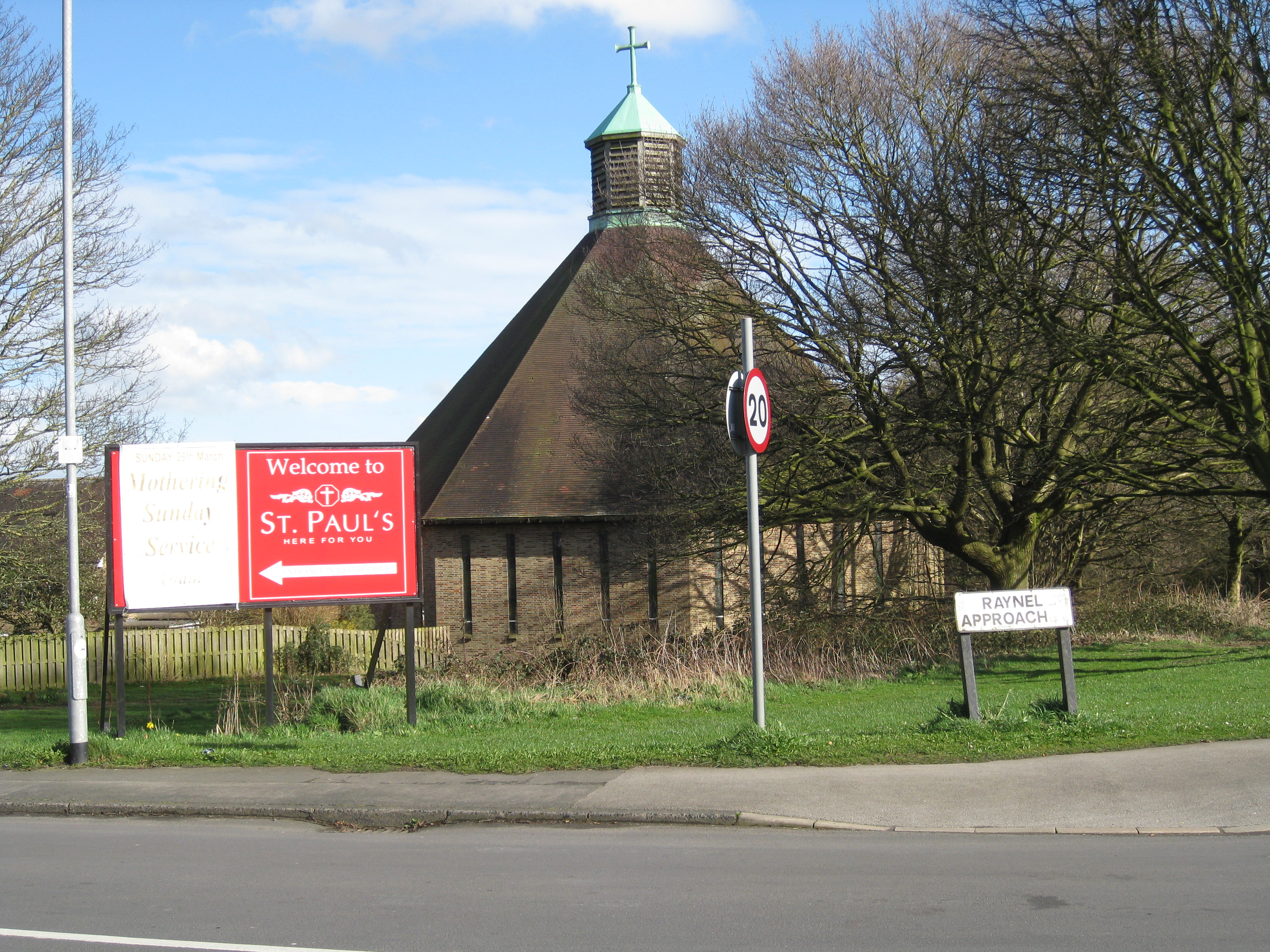
St Paul's Church

== Natural amenities ==
Ireland Wood is 7.6 hectares of 50% oak and 20% birch Secondary woodland which has a category A rating for its exceptional popularity. In addition, residents have access to several other woods including Clayton Wood which contains two large ponds and an ancient stone circle, and a large open area of the former Woodside Quarry.

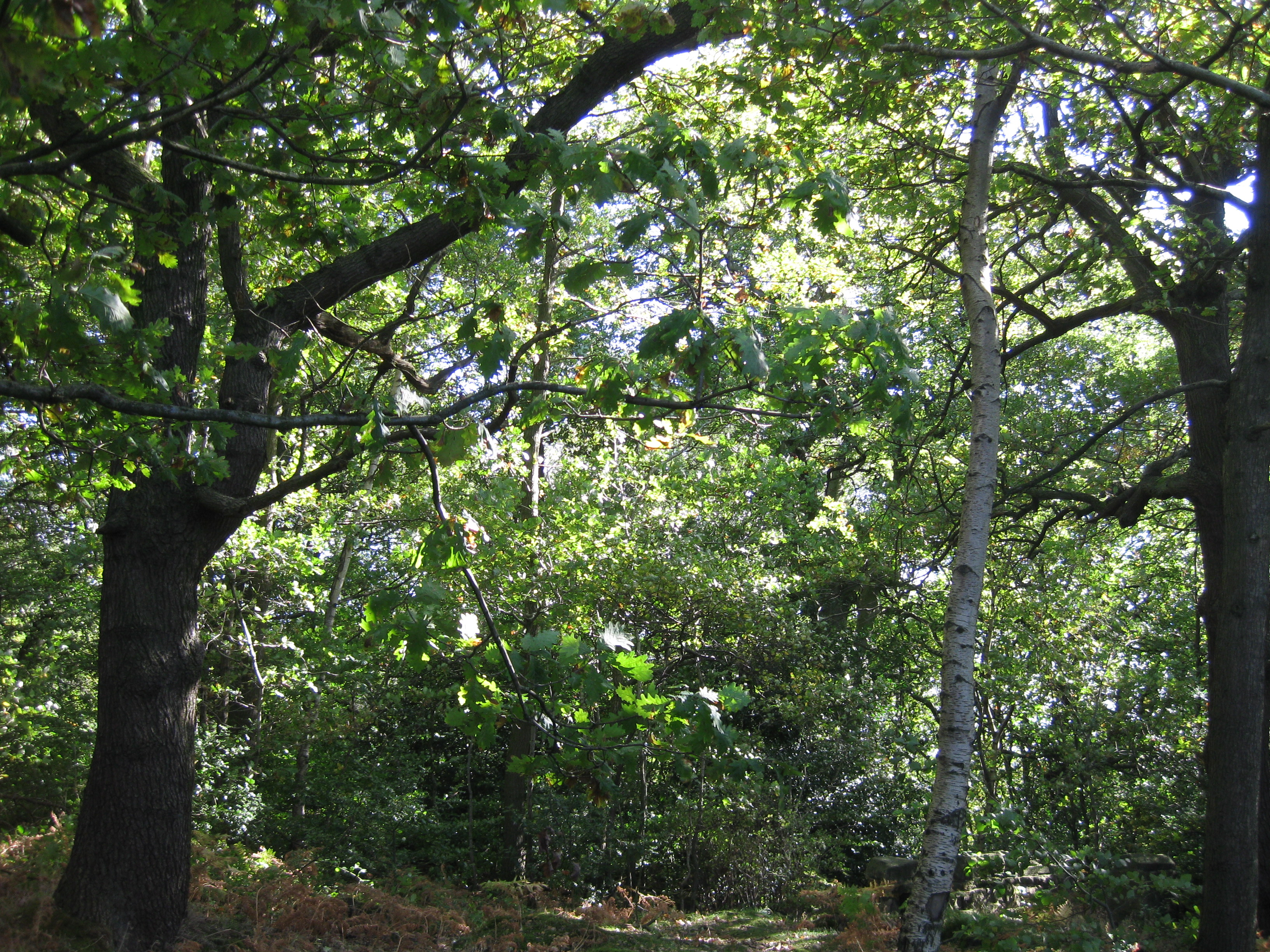
Oak and Birch trees

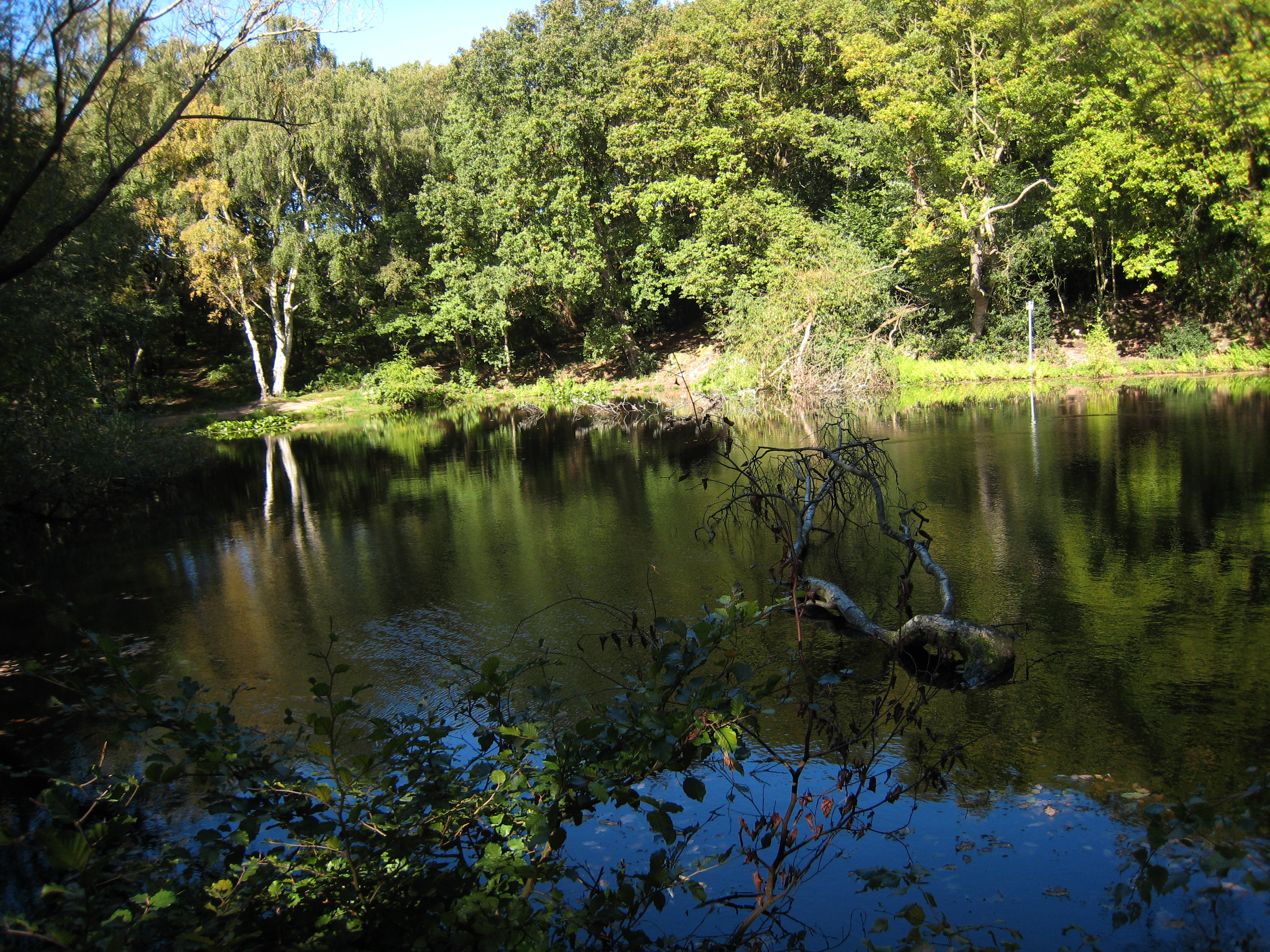
Pond in Clayton Wood

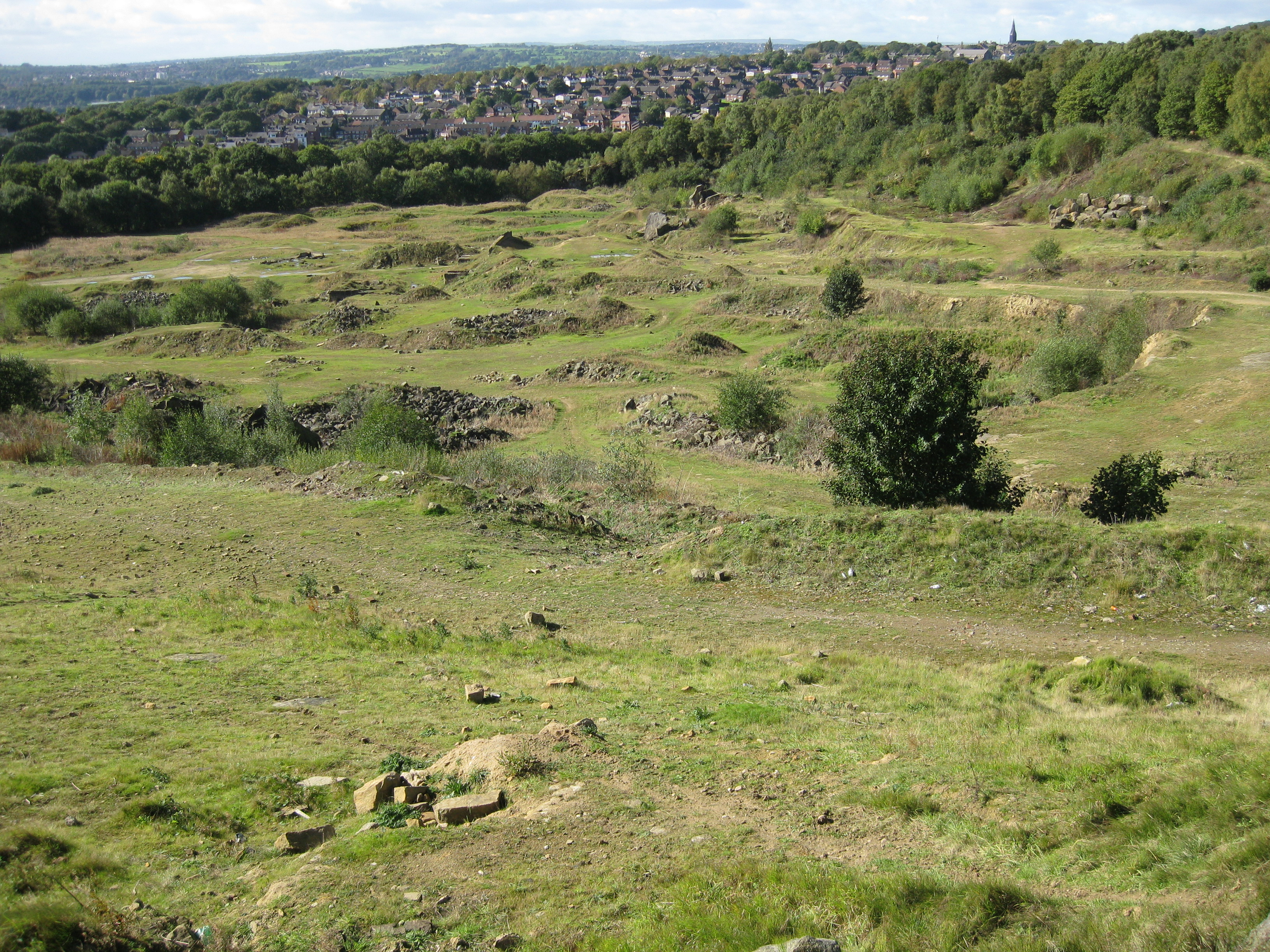
Woodside Quarry looking towards Horsforth

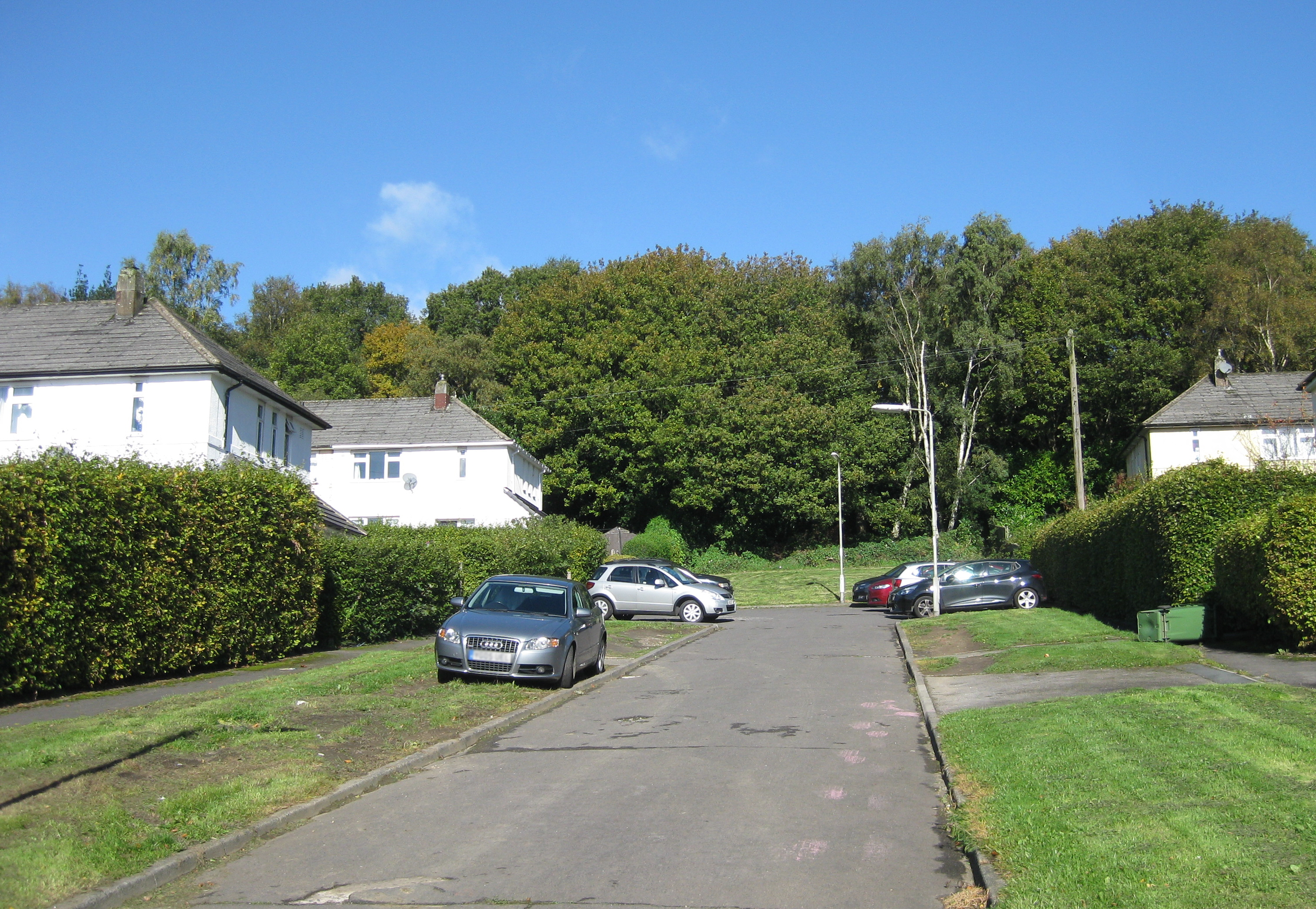
Ireland Wood approached from Iveson Green

== Transport ==
The main bus services with routes through Ireland Wood are the First Leeds City 23, linking the area with Holt Park, Horsforth railway station, Headingley and Leeds city centre and the First Bus Pink Line (19 & 19A) which connects the area with Kirkstall, Burley and Leeds city centre then Colton and Garforth.
