= Ainsty, Wetherby =

Area of Wetherby, West Yorkshire, England

Coordinates: 53.9382°N 1.3914°W

Ainsty
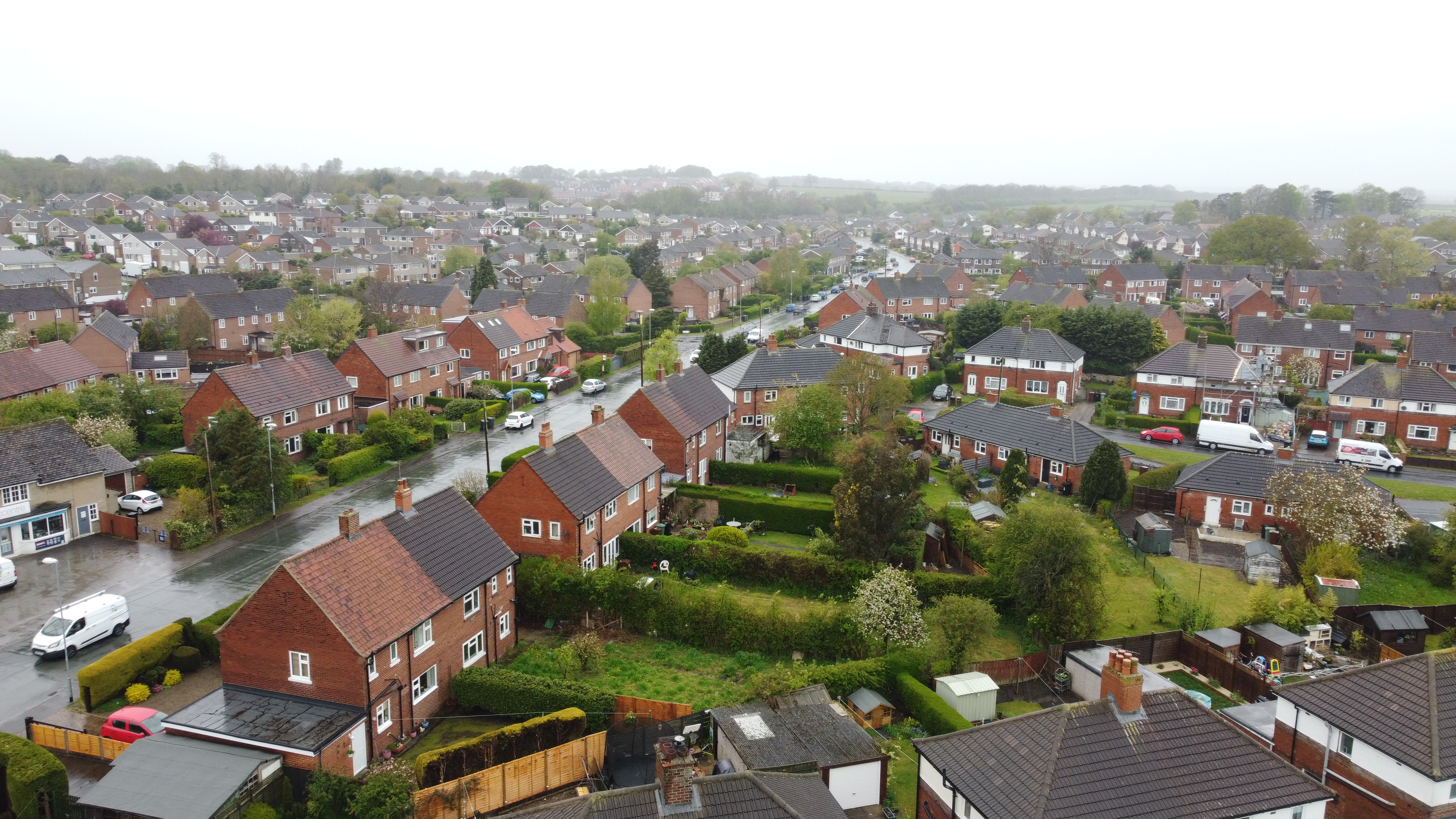
- Aerial view showing Ainsty Road and Ainsty Drive

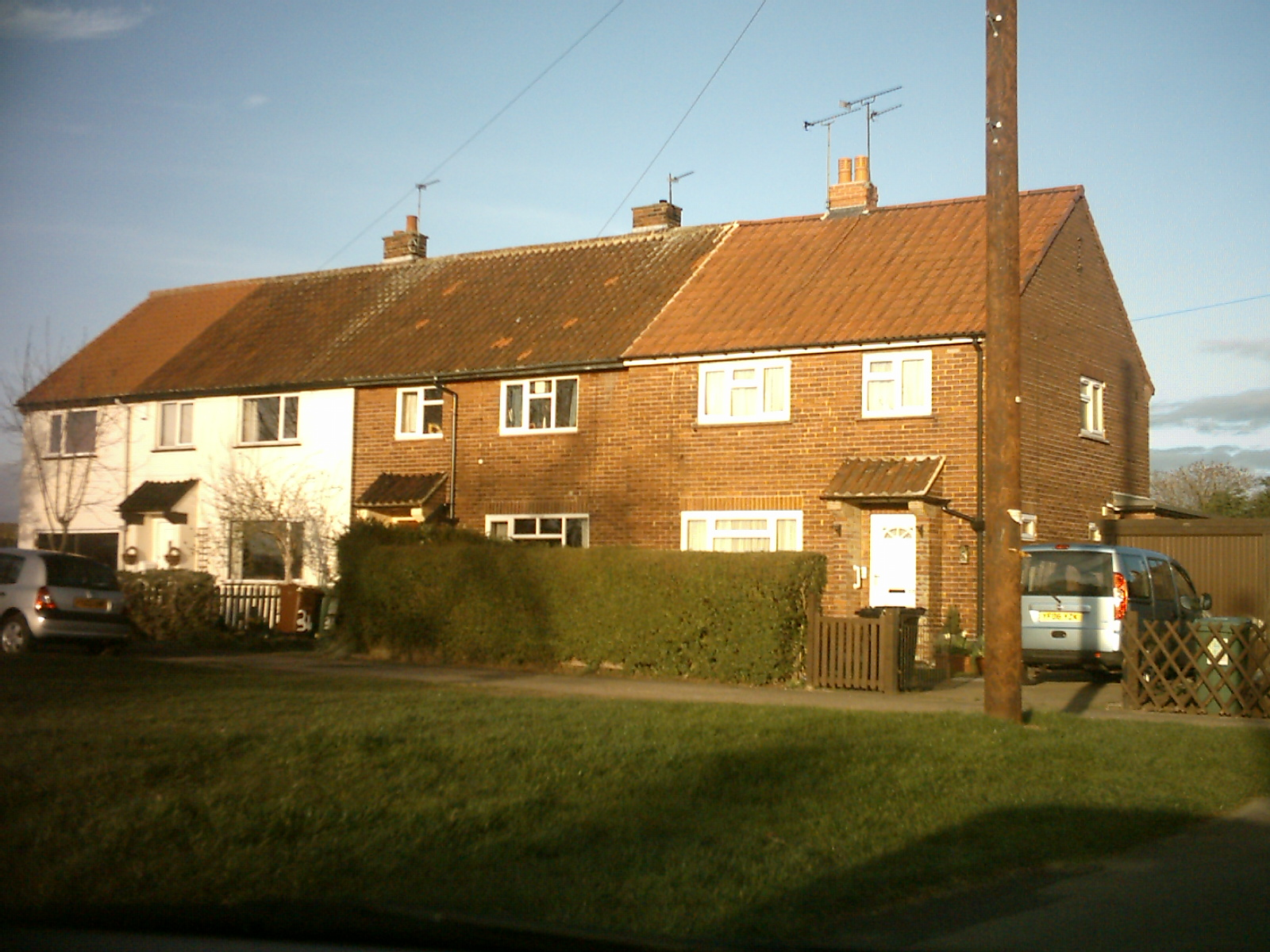
- Former council houses on Ainsty Crescent

- Location within West Yorkshire
- Metropolitan borough: City of Leeds
- Metropolitan county: West Yorkshire
- Region: Yorkshire and the Humber
- Country: England
- Sovereign state: United Kingdom
- Post town: WETHERBY
- Postcode district: LS22
- Dialling code: 01937
- Police: West Yorkshire
- Fire: West Yorkshire
- Ambulance: Yorkshire
- UK Parliament: Elmet and Rothwell

Ainsty is an area of Wetherby, West Yorkshire, England. Ainsty is in the north of Wetherby and runs as far as the border between North and West Yorkshire, to the north of this is Kirk Deighton.

== Location ==
Ainsty lies close to Deighton Bar, generally accepted to include areas along Deighton Road and the Badgerwood Estate. Ainsty, by most definitions, generally encompasses the estates around Ainsty Road, Aire Road, Nidd Approach, Oakwood Road and the northern section of Barleyfields Road. The area nearing the end of Aire Road is sometimes known as Priest Hill.

== History ==
Ainsty developed over many years, the earliest houses being built in the early 1950s and the latest of the houses being built in the mid-1990s by Bryant Homes. Ainsty contains a mix of private and council houses. The council housing as well as private housing around Coxwold Hill was built first, then in the 1960s, developer Ashtons built many houses (both semi detached and detached). Ashtons built many houses around West Yorkshire in this era, not only in Wetherby, but also in Holt Park, Knottingley and Mirfield.

== Amenities ==
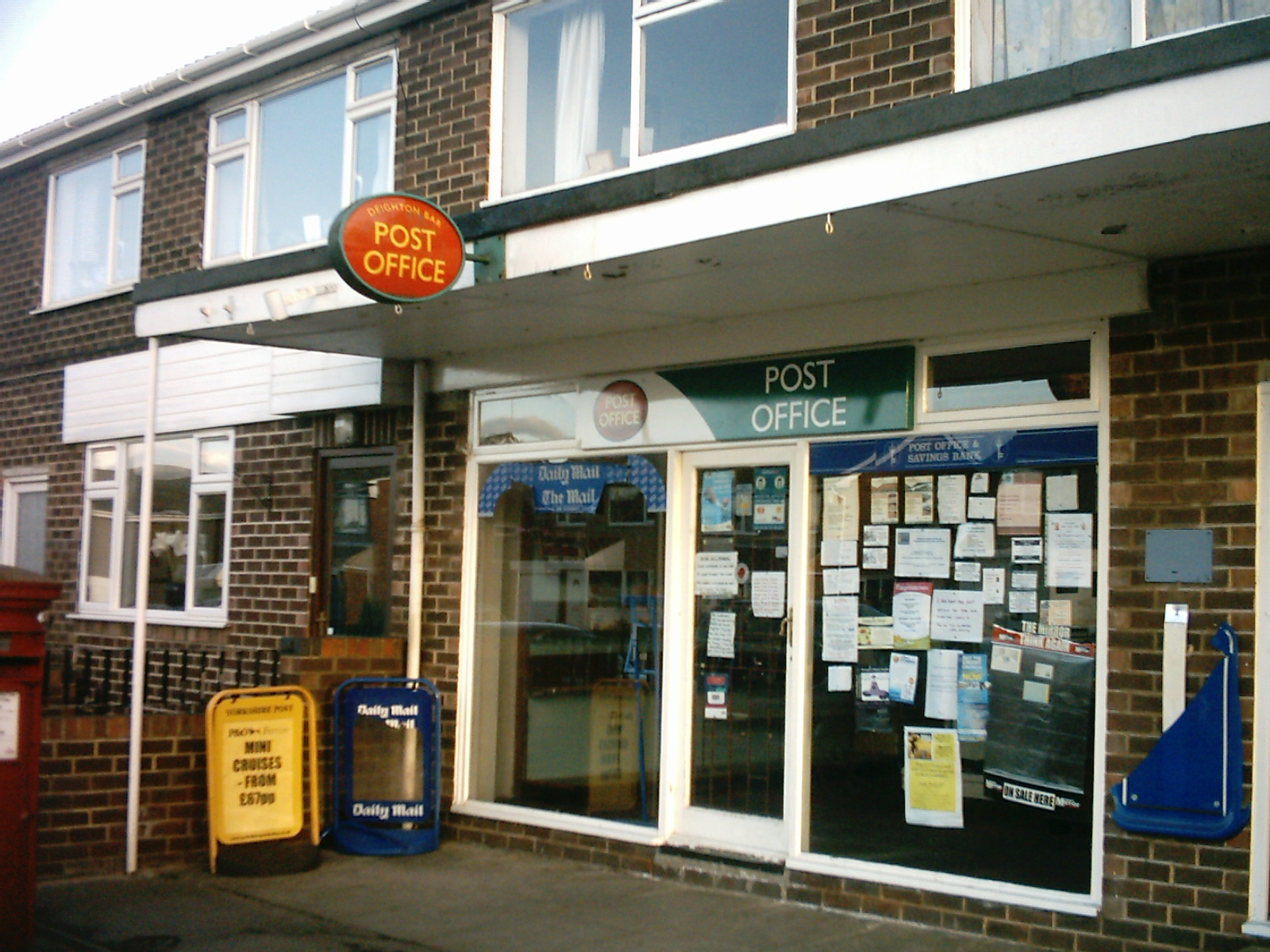
Deighton Bar Post Office on Aire Road

Currently Ainsty has a decorating centre situated on the lower end of Ainsty Road, a Co-operative convenience store which opens late into the night further down Ainsty Road, a Post Office on Aire Road, named Deighton Bar post office. Ainsty also boasts a junior school (Deighton Gates primary school) and areas of open recreation. The Co-op was formerly a parade of shops and has had in the past between one and four shops on it at any time, with shops expanding into each other and then being divided up again to suit the owners. In the past this parade has had a launderette, tool hire shop, newsagent (Ainsty News), Nisa, Happy Shopper and independent convenience shop (Harves and Green Grocers). The decorating centre for many years was a sandwich shop, while the parade of shops on Aire Road (all except the Post Office are now flats) has had a hairdresser, sports shop (Sports Zone) and other businesses in the past. There is no public house on the estate, however there is a working men's club on the Sandbeck Industrial estate, only a short walk from the estate, while the Bay Horse public house in Kirk Deighton serves residents in the area.

== Transport ==
The estate lies close to junction 46 of the A1(M) and Wetherby service station. The First Leeds X98 bus service (Leeds City Square to Wetherby Deighton Bar) links the estate with Wetherby bus station, Linton, Collingham, Seacroft, Oakwood, Harehills and Leeds city centre. The estate is also linked to Knaresborough by Connexionsbuses service 780.

== Gallery ==
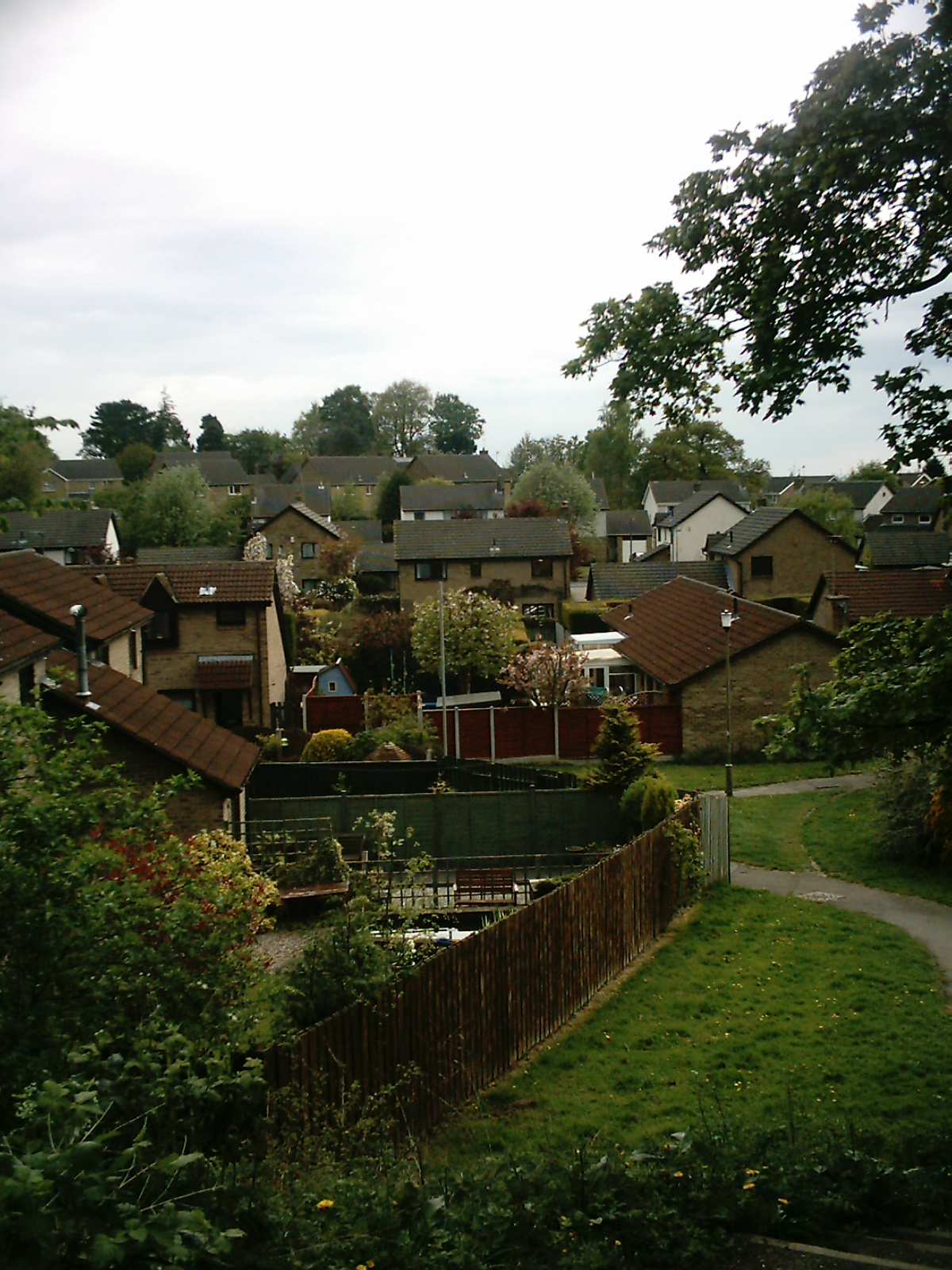
1980s private housing in Ainsty

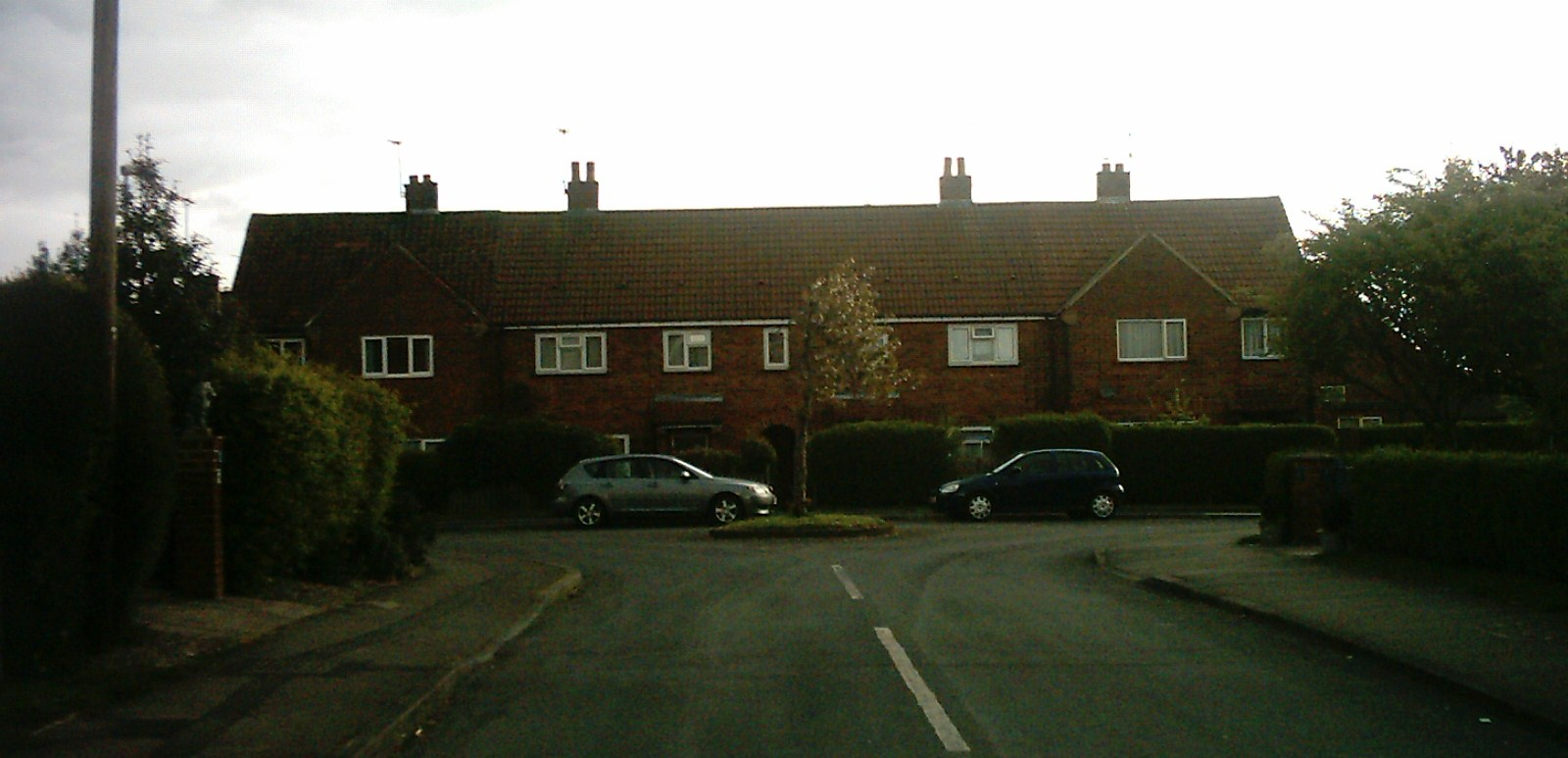
Council housing on Ainsty Crescent

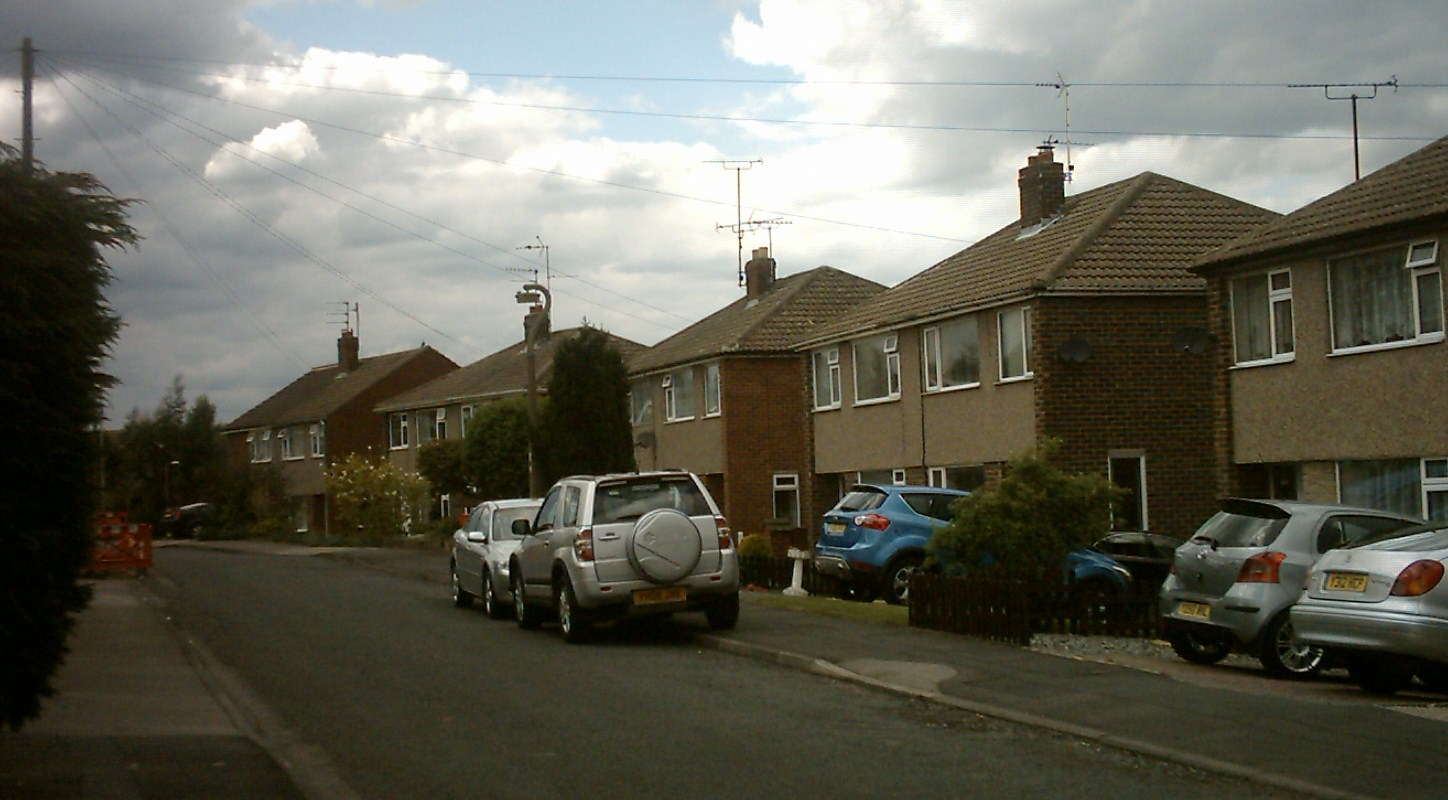
Ashtons semi-detached houses on Poplar Avenue

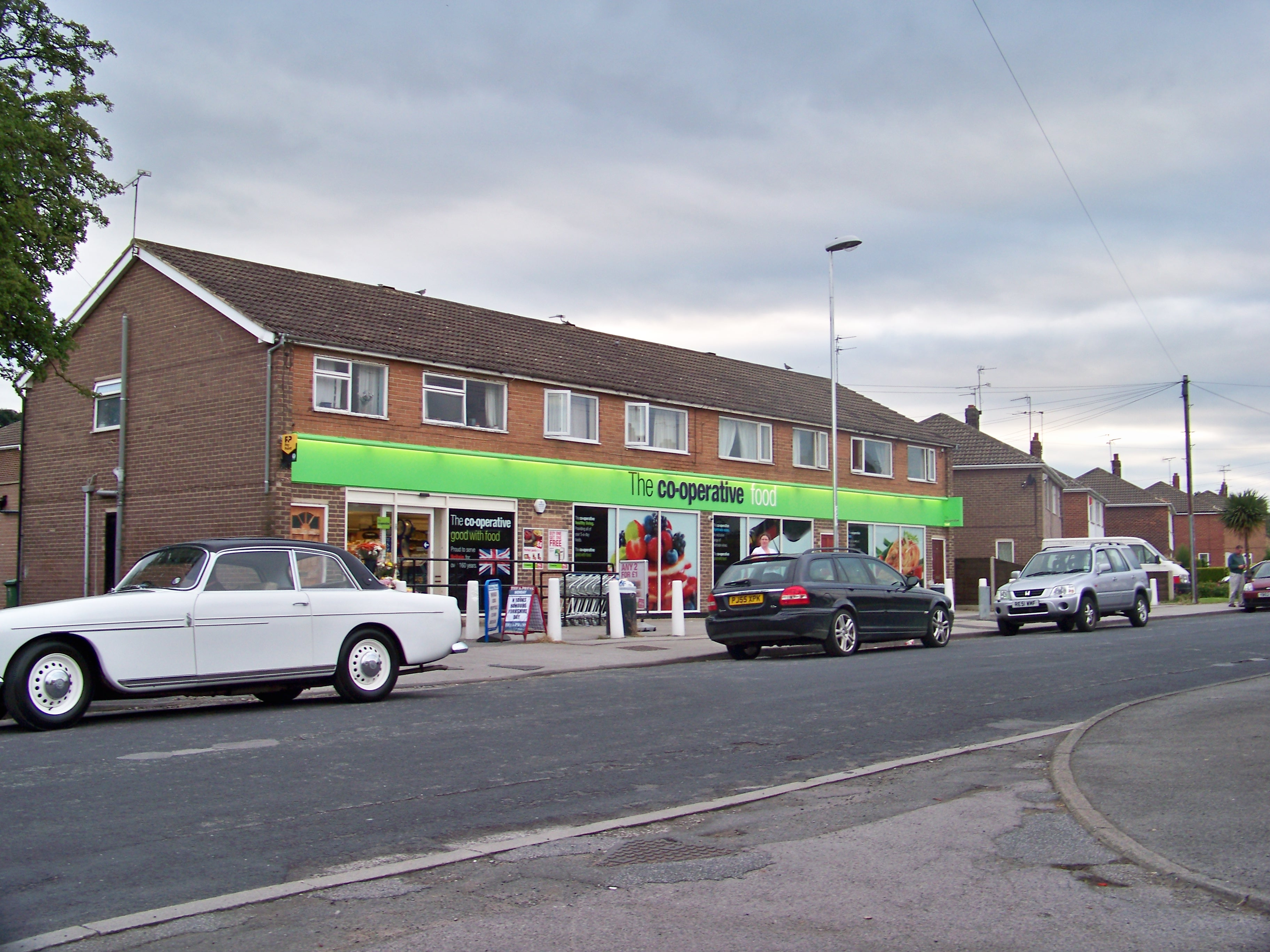
The Co-op on Ainsty Road

== See also ==
- Ainsty of York
