= Tinshill =

District of Leeds, West Yorkshire, England

Coordinates: 53.851°N 1.618°W

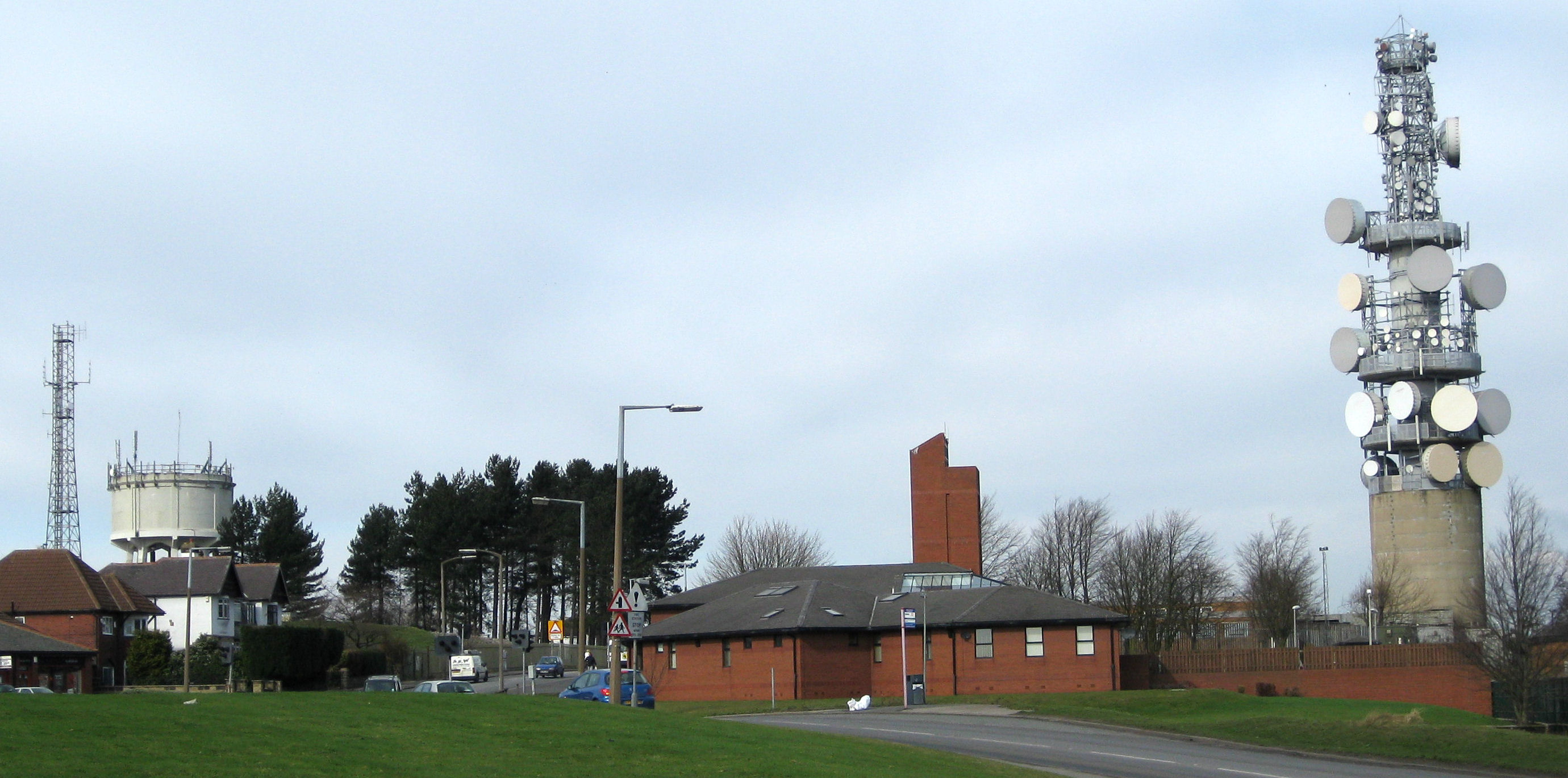
The high point on Otley Old Road, showing (left) Tinshill Water Tower, (middle) Cookridge Fire Station, (right) Tinshill BT Tower

Tinshill (pronounced Tins-hill) is a district of Leeds, 4 miles (7 km) north of Leeds city centre, West Yorkshire, England. Tinshill was named "Tyndr's Hyll" by the Danes in the 9th century.

The district is in the Weetwood ward of Leeds City Council and lies between Horsforth and Cookridge. When the estate was planned in the 1940s it was known as the "Cookridge Tower Estate". The estate predated surrounding estates such as Ireland Wood and Moor Grange. Holt Park came many years later and provided many facilities such as an Asda supermarket, shopping centre, leisure centre and secondary school. The area was mainly made up of social housing, although a growing number of these houses are privately owned. The landmark Tinshill BT Tower, also known as the Cookridge Tower, is one of the highest points in Leeds.

== Transportation ==
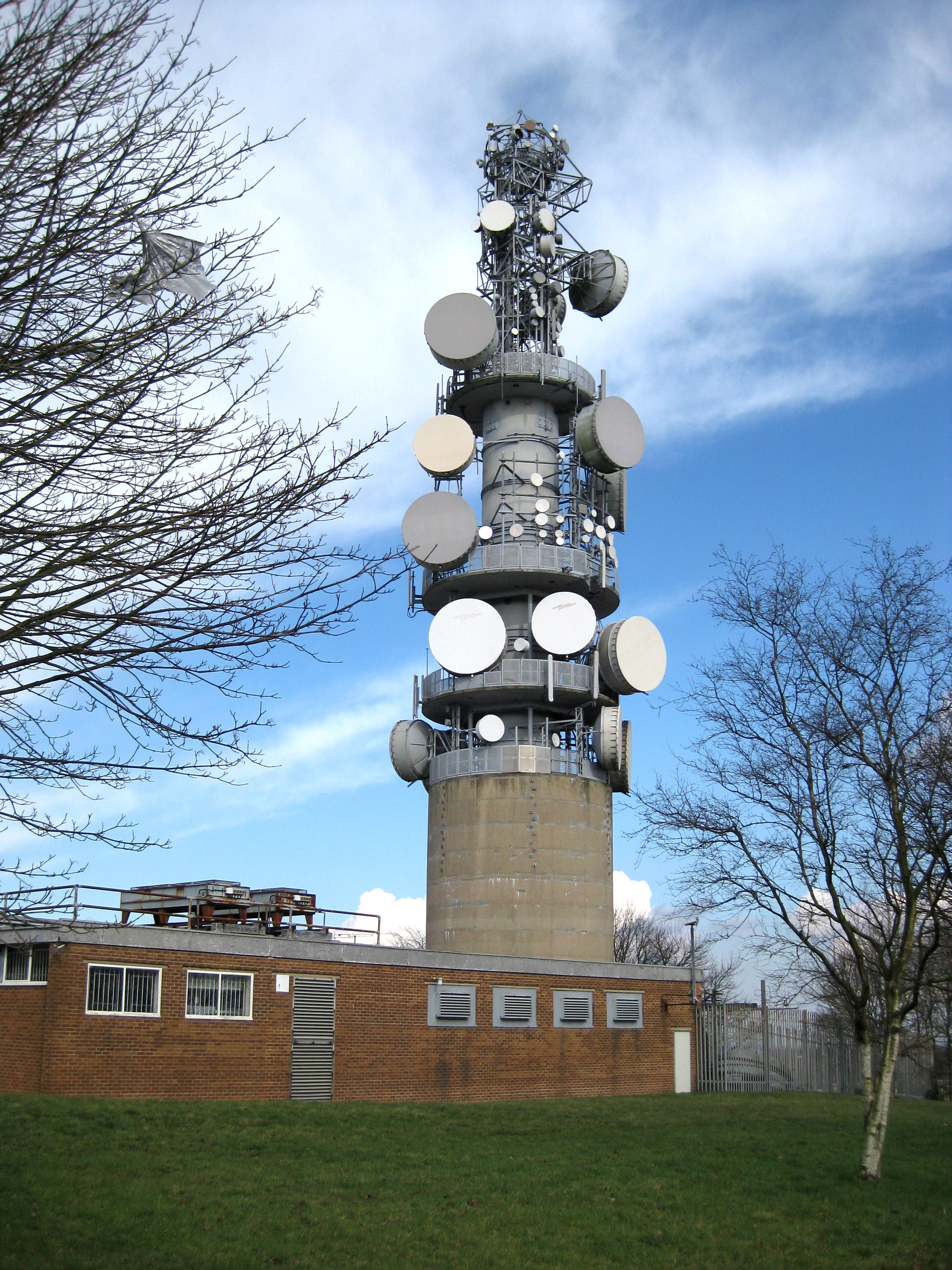
Tinshill BT Tower

Horsforth railway station, at the eastern edge of Horsforth, serves Tinshill; the station is on the Cookridge side of the Moseley Beck.

Tinshill & Cookridge Social Club & Institute, a Working Mens Club on Woodnook Drive, is the terminus of the First Leeds bus service 19a, a route promoted as the "Pink Line". Route 19a runs via - Headingley Stadium - Leeds city centre - York Road to Colton. The "Sky Blue Line", bus route 6, runs from Holt Park - Cookridge - Tinshill - Weetwood - Headingley - University of Leeds to Leeds City bus station.

== Housing ==
Housing in Tinshill consists of former and current local authority housing and privately-owned houses constructed around the time that the Tinshill estate was developed. Blocks of brick-built council flats were constructed around the same time.

== See also ==
- Listed buildings in Leeds (Weetwood Ward)
