= Horsforth Woodside railway station =

Proposed railway station in West Yorkshire, England

Horsforth Woodside

General information
- Location: Horsforth, City of Leeds; England
- Coordinates: 53.8391°N 1.6160°W
- Grid reference: SE253381
- Managed by: Northern
- Transit authority: West Yorkshire (Metro)
- Platforms: 2 (intended)

Other information
- Fare zone: 2

Key dates
- 1852: Opened
- 1864: Closed
Location

Horsforth Woodside was a proposed railway station that was to be built on the site of Woodside Quarry near Horsforth in West Yorkshire, England. It would have been located on the Harrogate Line near the current Horsforth station, which would also stay open. Horsforth Woodside was also the name of a very early station on the Leeds-Northallerton railway, which was closed completely in 1864. The fact that both the old closed station and the proposed new station have the same name has caused confusion when railway historical matters in this area are being discussed. The proposed station would have served a planned housing development at the former Woodside Quarry, as well as providing a park and ride service for Leeds city centre.

A turn-back facility was built in 2012 at nearby Horsforth station which allows for future timetabling improvements. That was related to the intention of opening the new station at Horsforth Woodside.

In a 2014 feasibility study, the West Yorkshire Combined Authority decided not to pursue with Horsforth Woodside for a number of reasons: the opening of Apperley Bridge and Kirkstall Forge stations on the Airedale Line (which are in the same area), its proximity to Horsforth railway station, and the proposal for a park and ride facility at nearby Boddington. It was argued, however, that with plans to build 2000 homes near the site of the proposed station, it was still needed.
