= Ashtons =

House builder in Yorkshire, 1933 to 1972

Norman C Ashton
- Industry: Housebuilding
- Founded: 1933
- Defunct: 1972
- Fate: Acquired
- Successor: Persimmon plc
- Headquarters: Leeds, West Yorkshire, England

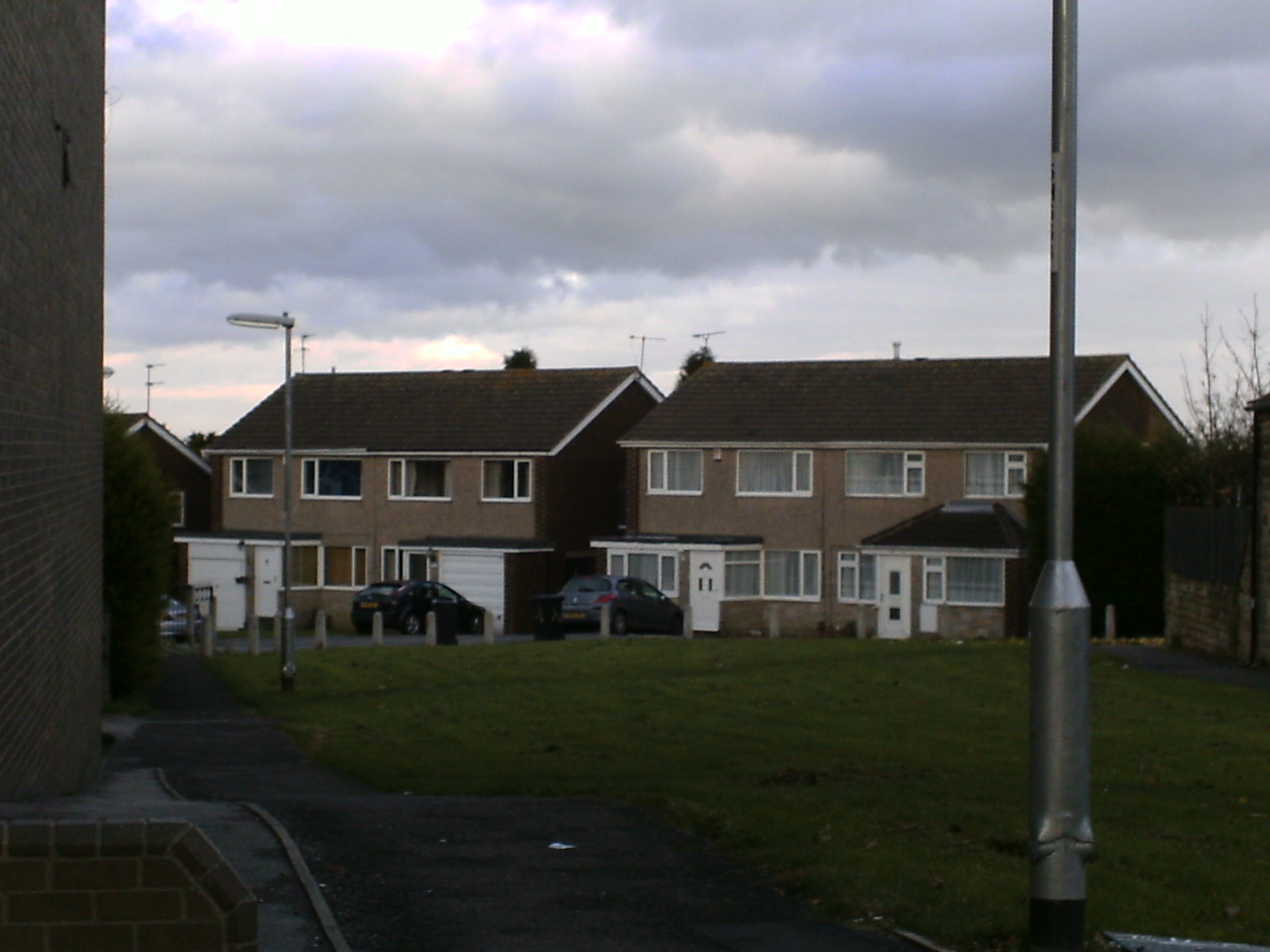
Ashton semi detached houses in Holt Park, Leeds, built in the early 1970s.

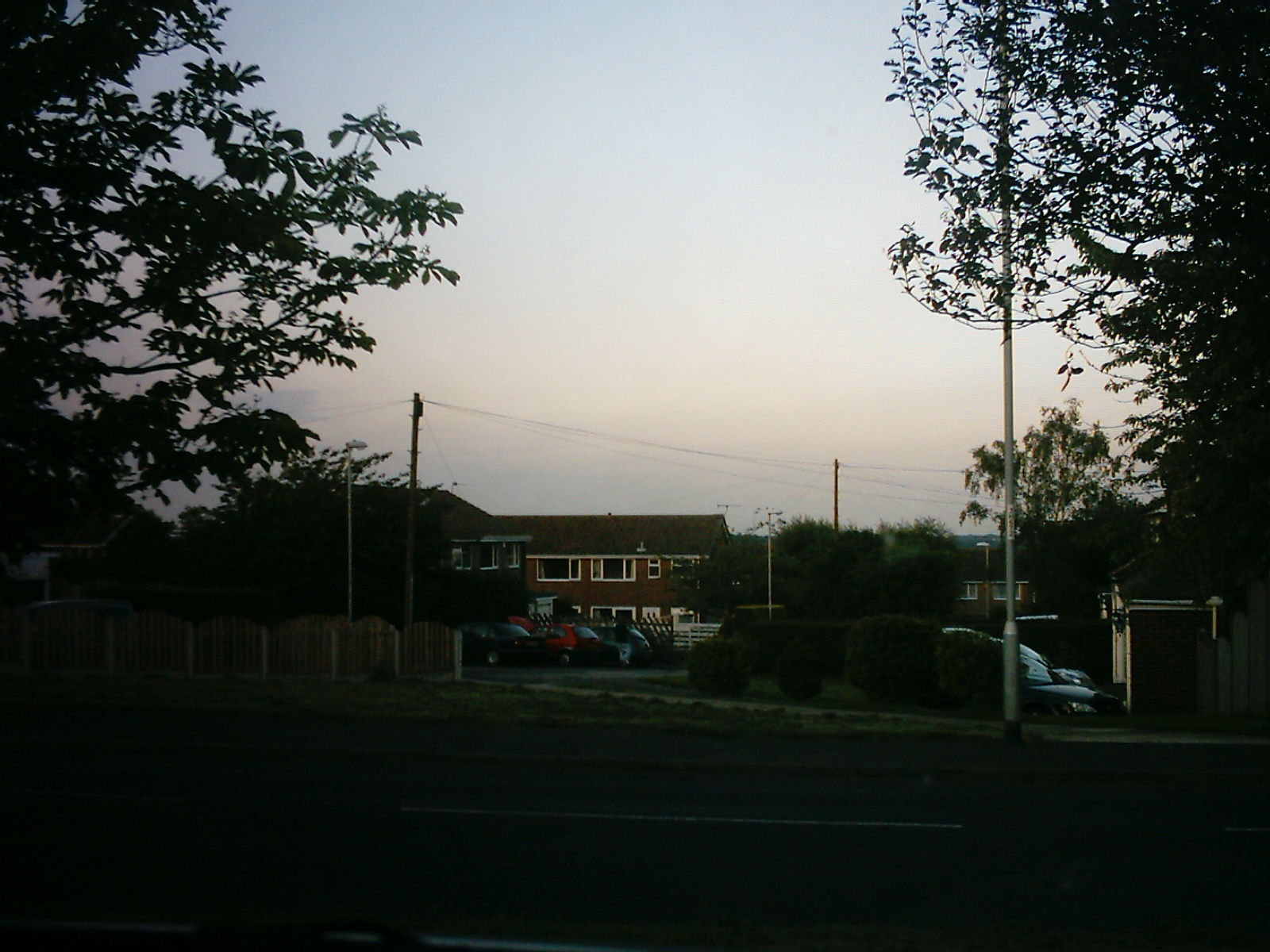
Ashtons Housing in Holt Park, Leeds

Ashtons was a housebuilder in Yorkshire in the 1950s, 1960s and 1970s.

== History ==
Norman Ashton started his Leeds-based housebuilding business in 1933, and it was incorporated in 1938 as Norman C Ashton Ltd. Following the outbreak of war in 1939, the company was restricted to contracting for local authorities; it also established a motor repair business. Private housebuilding resumed after the war and when Ashton was floated in 1964 it claimed to be one of the largest housebuilders operating in the West Riding. Growth was only modest thereafter and Ashton was acquired by Orme in 1972.

The company constructed many homes in northern England during the 1960s and 1970s. It was one of several pioneers of the British three bed semi, a style of house used frequently from the 1940s until the 1970s, they also built many four and five bedroomed detached houses. Most Ashtons housing were built in close proximity with council housing; Holt Park in Leeds was a joint project between Ashtons and Leeds City Council. Ainsty in Wetherby is also a large mixed development with many Ashtons and Leeds City Council houses. Knottingley, Mirfield and Washington also include many Ashtons houses.

== Controversies ==
The company was at the centre of a controversy concerning a covenant on one of their early developments in 1956. This resulted in the Bell v Norman C. Ashton Ltd (1956) P&CR 359 case which came before the Leeds Courts. Ashton had purchased land with a covenant that meant they could not build on it.
