= Holt Park =

Housing estate in Leeds, England

Coordinates: 53.858°N 1.601°W

Holt Park (Leeds)

Holt Park is a medium-sized low-rise 1970s housing estate in the northwest suburbs of Leeds, West Yorkshire, England. It is approximately 6 miles (10 km) from Leeds city centre situated between Tinshill, Cookridge and Adel, and is at the edge of the Leeds urban fringe, bordering the green belt which makes up two thirds of the metropolitan borough of the City of Leeds. The nearby Tinshill BT Tower dominates the skyline.

Holt Park is in the Leeds North West constituency; its Member of Parliament is Labour's Katie White. It is part of the Adel & Wharfedale ward of Leeds City Council.

== Housing ==
One half of Holt Park was built as a council estate; the other half as private housing, built to typical British 1970s design by the well-known property developer Norman C. Ashton Limited (similar/identical architecture and build can be found in other areas in Leeds and West Yorkshire, including Otley, Ainsty in Wetherby, Ferrybridge and Knottingley), comprising a mixture of detached and semi-detached housing, and several apartments. This came about after an agreement between Norman Ashton (an experienced developer) and Leeds City Council to create a new 'village' within the city, which would include a mixture of private and council housing stock with shops and leisure facilities.

The farm was sold to the developers by The Co-op, who purchased the land in 1920 as one of five dairy farms in Leeds. The earlier housing was completed before the farm was closed, and the farmer took advantage of this delivering milk to all the new residents in the early years.

The council housing is a mixture of two-story terraced houses, end-bungalows and flats with bedroom numbers ranging from one to four. These are set in cul-de-sacs within, off and on the periphery of Holtdale Approach, connected by various alleyways and footpaths. Some of this stock is now privately owned, but much of it remains under the control of the Council. Several blocks of flats, set over three storeys, also exist, albeit owned/managed by a housing association. At the same time two schools (Holt Park Middle School and Ralph Thoresby High School), a sports centre (Holt Park Leisure Centre), a library (Holt Park Library, which was annexed to and therefore part of the High School) were built and a shopping centre were built.

== Ralph Thoresby School ==
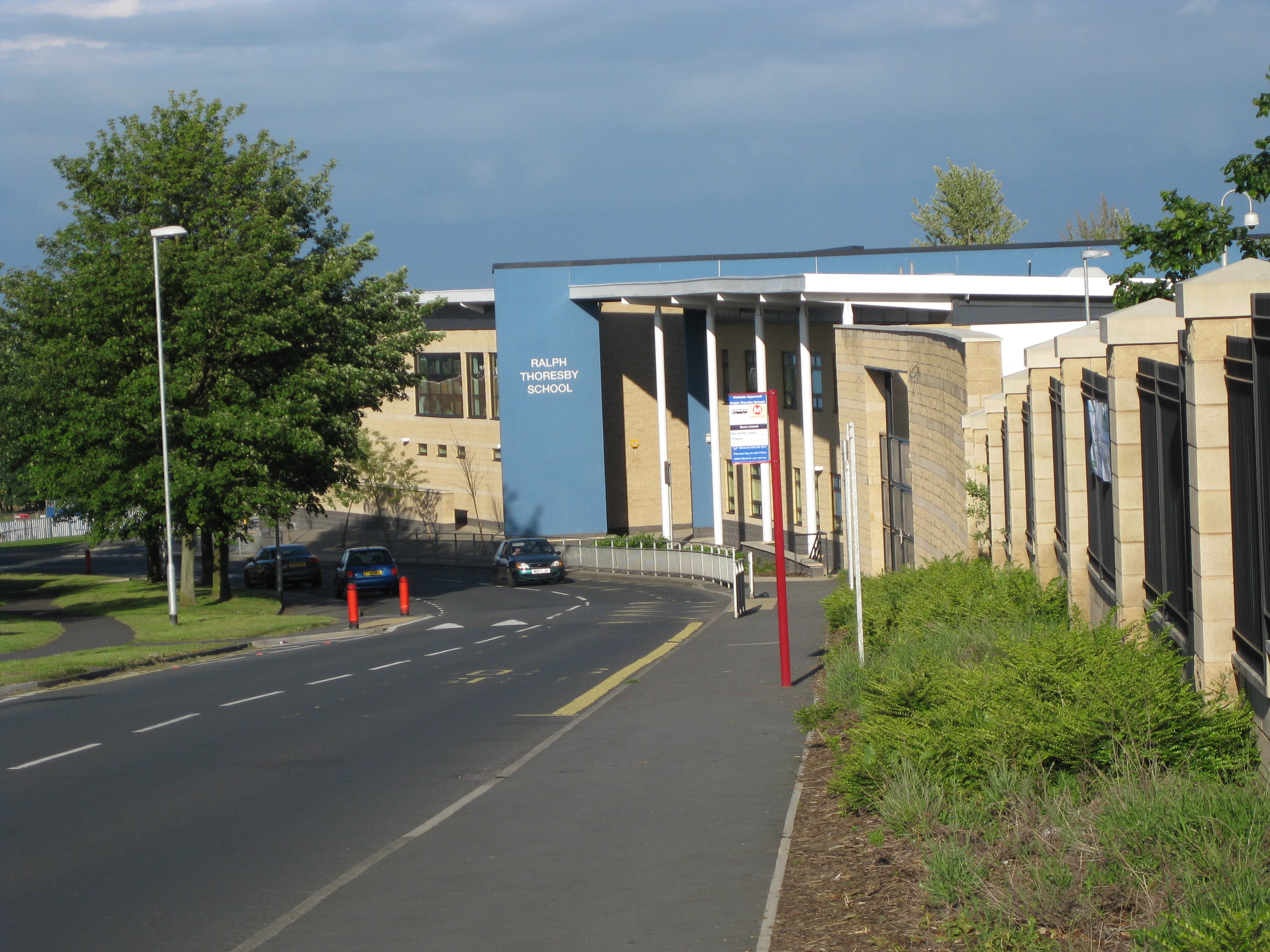
Ralph Thoresby School 2009.

The original Ralph Thoresby buildings were built around 1975 and remained the school's premises until September 2007. It was strategically built as part of the district centre and so the leisure centre and the library were fully accessible to the public and part of the school's premises.

Holt Park Library and Ralph Thoresby High School were rebuilt on a new site off Holtdale Approach (south), with the opening in September 2007. This is one in a long line of North Leeds secondary schools to be rebuilt, following Lawnswood School and Roundhay School to name but two.

== Holt Park District Centre ==
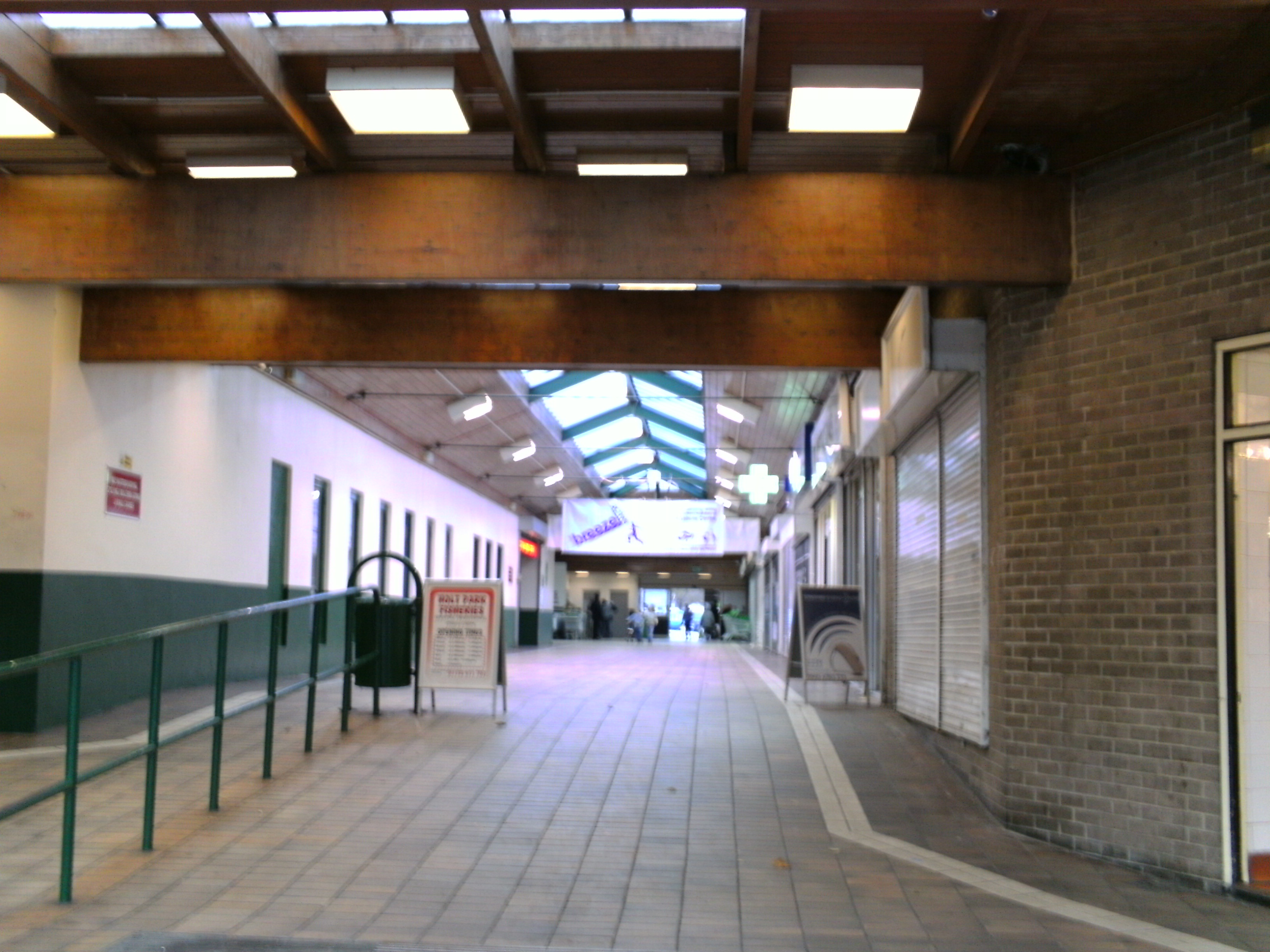
The Interior of the Holt Park District Centre.

The shopping centre began to decrease in character from the late 1990s, with many businesses occupying the units either closing or relocating. The Asda supermarket that has been the main anchor of the centre since it opened in the early 1970s, has enlarged its floor space by taking over some of the empty shop units. A complete redevelopment of the district centre has been discussed for many years. In 2005, a planning application was submitted to Leeds City Council for a complete rebuild of the shopping centre and a standalone Asda superstore with a petrol station to be built next to it. The plans were ultimately rejected. However, discussions remain ongoing.

Adjacent to the shopping centre is High Farm, the farm which the estate was originally built on and around, and later converted into a public house. The building itself is known to date back to the 17th century and the interior of the pub still contains period features such the original oak beams. The shopping centre also contains the area's bus 'station'. In many ways the district centre is similar (although smaller) to many new town shopping centres such as those in Newton Aycliffe and Cumbernauld.

=== Public houses ===
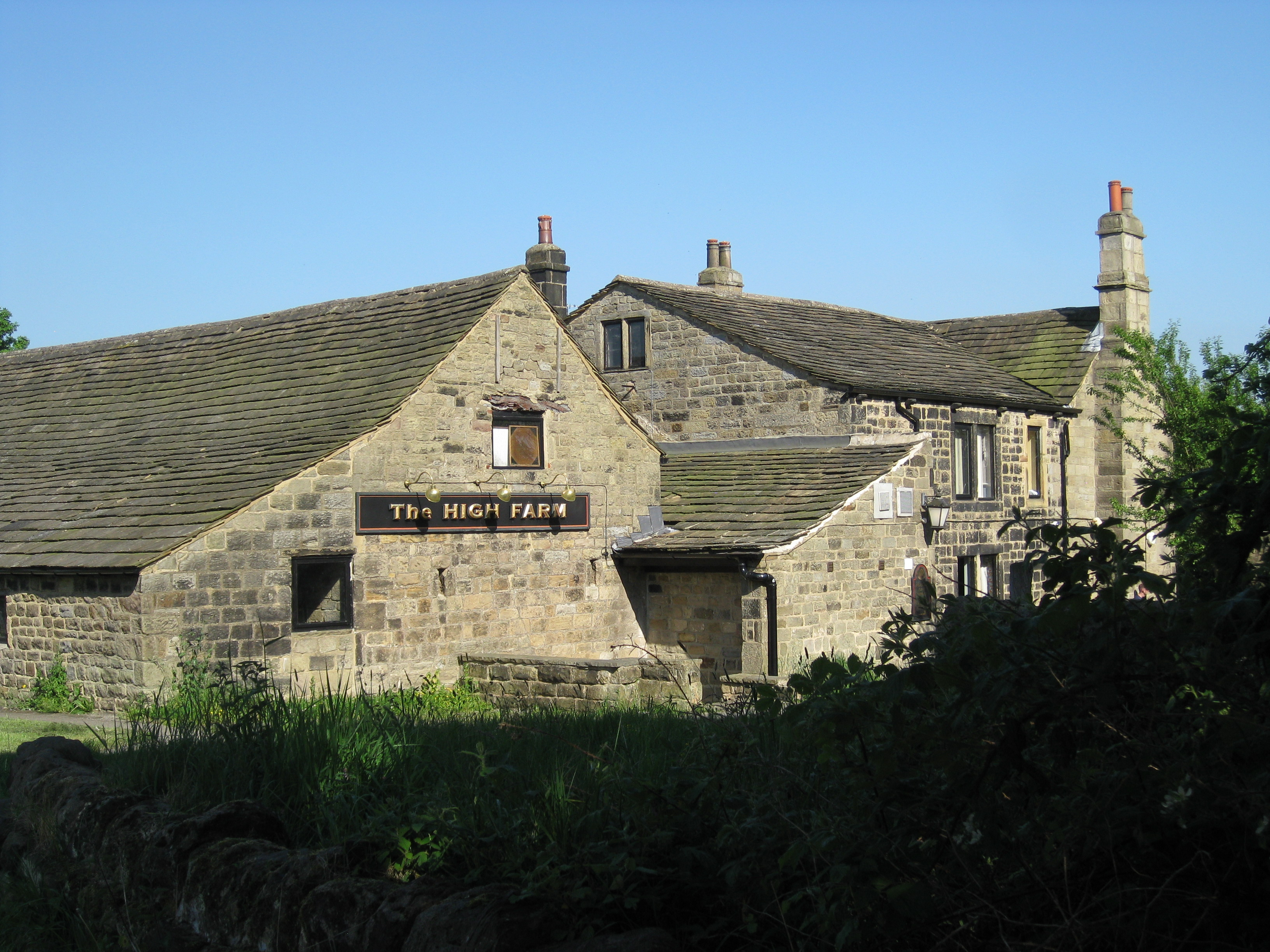
The High Farm public house

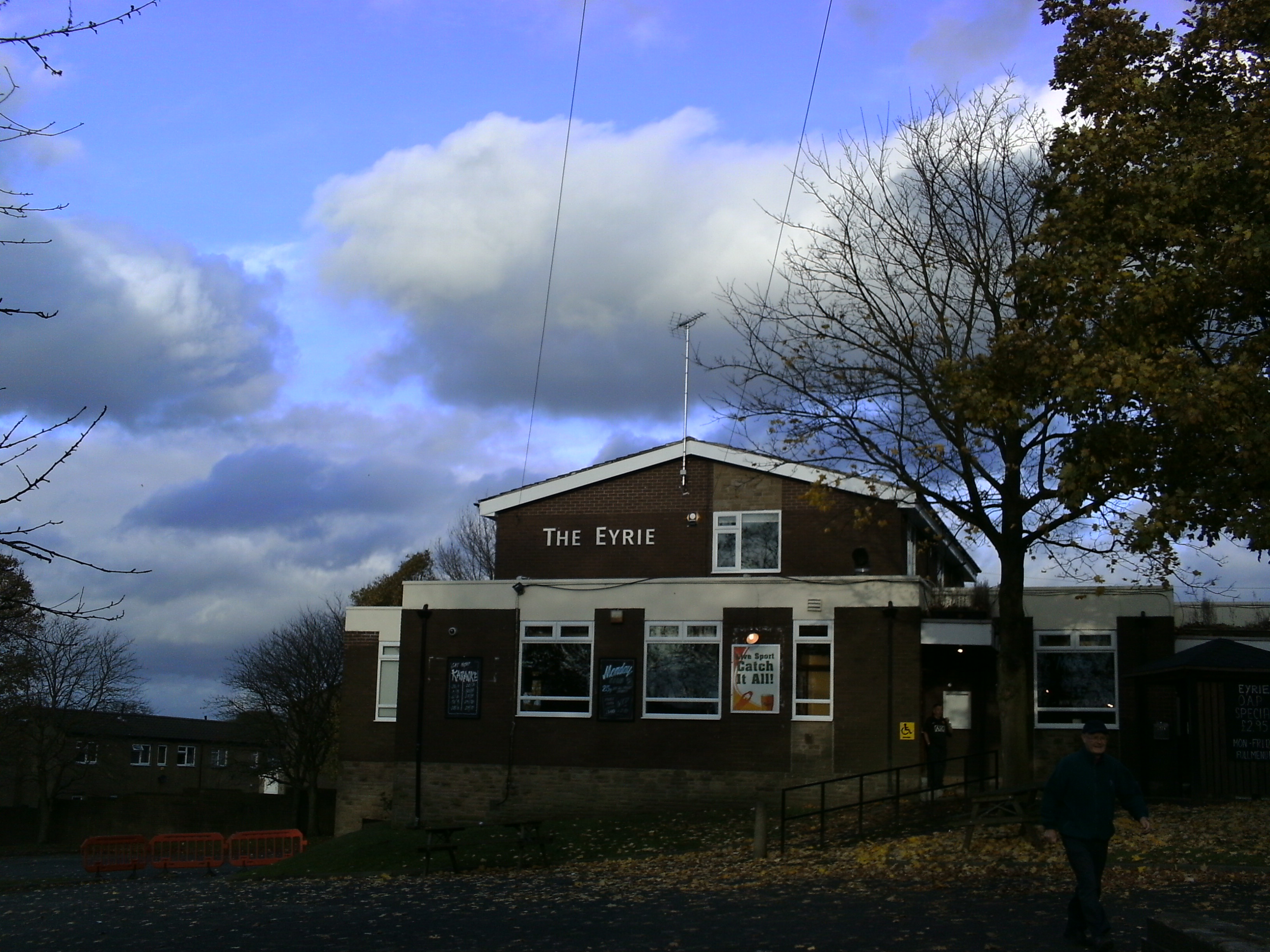
The Eyrie public house

There is now just one public house in Holt Park, The High Farm, adjacent to the shopping centre, is situated in the old farm buildings and won awards when converted into a pub in the 1970s. The High Farm pub was formerly tied to Hull based brewery North Country Breweries and latterly the Mansfield Brewery. It has a function room in an original barn with beams dating back to the 16th century.

== Transport ==
Holt Park has bus services operated by First Leeds (formerly Yorkshire Rider), particularly Route 24 (formerly the 1 "Brown Line") which runs from the shopping centre, through Weetwood, Headingley, Leeds University, Leeds city centre and terminates in the South Leeds area of Beeston. The original terminus of the Route 1 in Holt Park was the roundel where Heathfield meets Holt Lane. The first public-service bendy-buses in the United Kingdom were pioneered on this route in 1999. By 2009, withdrawals had begun on these vehicles, and the last set of FTR Bendybuses for First Leeds were withdrawn in 2016 when they were replaced with new 16 plate Wrightbus Streetdeck double deckers.

The Route 23 (formerly the 6 "Sky Blue Line" and the 96 "Sky Line") bus service runs through Cookridge, Tinshill, Weetwood, Headingley and Leeds University to Leeds City bus station. The original 96 route ran to and terminated at Cookridge. In the late 2000s, the route was extended to Holt Park via Cookridge, before being renumbered as the number 6 in August 2010 and 23 in October 2024.

Route 940 (operated by Connexionsbuses) also runs from the shopping centre to Otley, via Bramhope and Pool-in-Wharfedale.

Routes 31 and 32 operate from Holt Park Shopping Centre to Horsforth Green on circular routes. These are run by Squarepeg Buses.

All buses are governed by West Yorkshire Metro (and The West Yorkshire Combined Authority).

The nearest railway station to Holt Park is Horsforth situated on the Leeds-Harrogate-York Line.

== Gallery ==
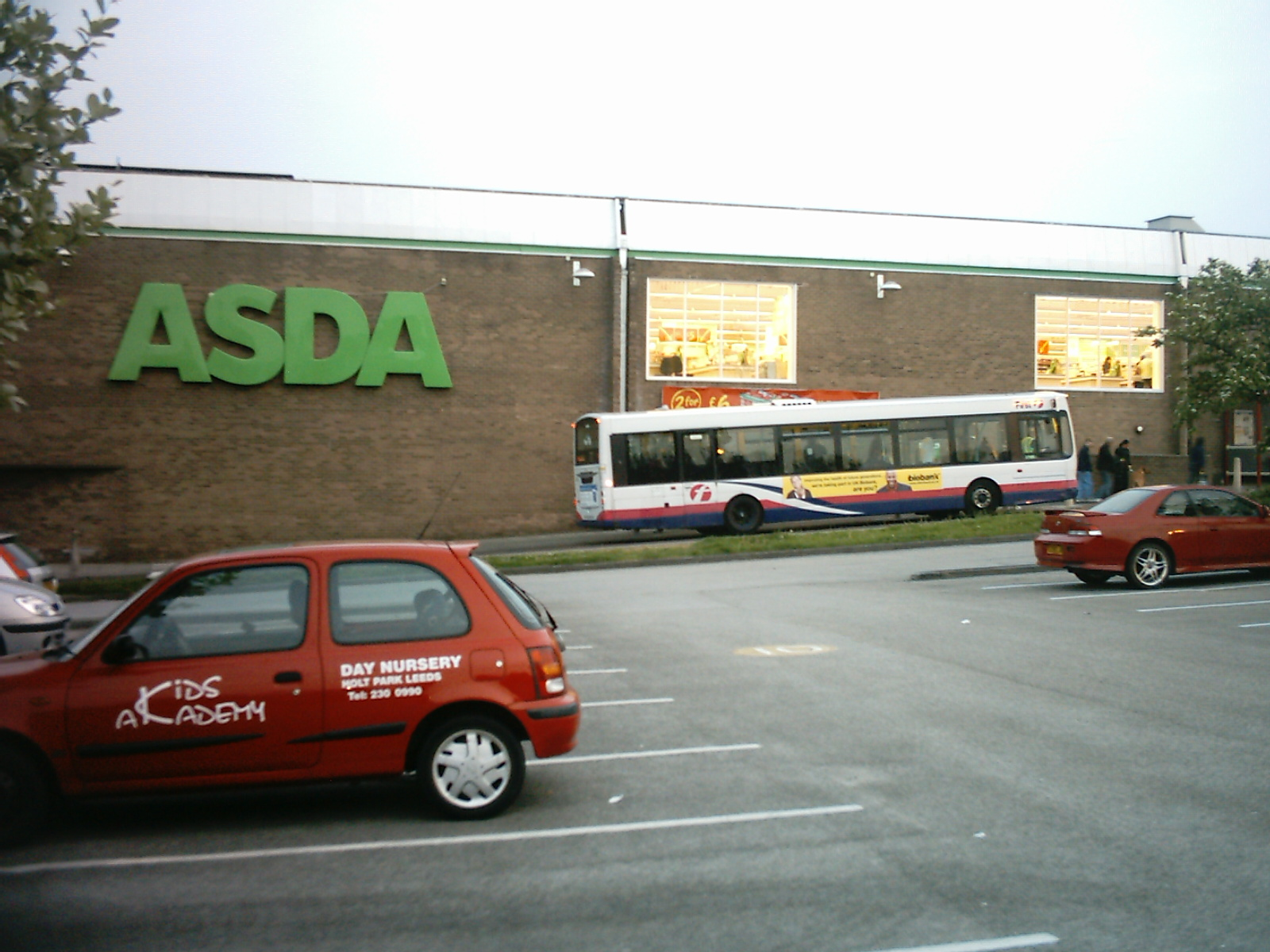
A bus outside the Asda Supermarket at Holt Park
