= Horsforth railway station =

Railway station in West Yorkshire, England

Horsforth
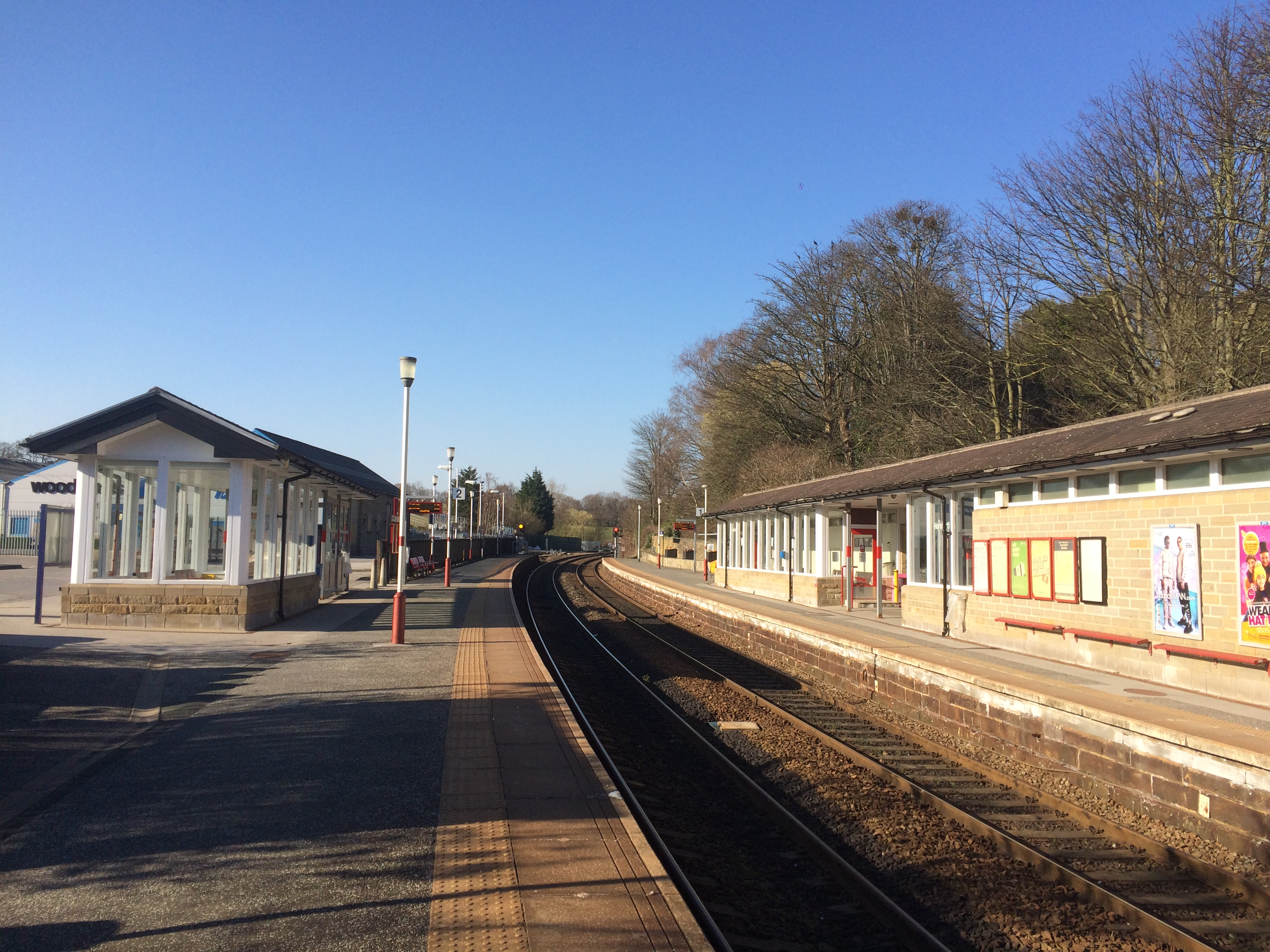
- View of both platforms

General information
- Location: Horsforth, City of Leeds; England
- Coordinates: 53.8476°N 1.6302°W
- Grid reference: SE244391
- Managed by: Northern
- Transit authority: West Yorkshire (Metro)
- Platforms: 2

Other information
- Station code: HRS
- Fare zone: 2
- Classification: DfT category F1

History
- Opened: 1849

Passengers
- 2020/21: ▼0.159 million
- Interchange: 208
- 2021/22: ▲0.561 million
- Interchange: ▲958
- 2022/23: ▲0.668 million
- Interchange: ▲2,567
- 2023/24: ▲0.740 million
- Interchange: ▲3,104
- 2024/25: ▲0.890 million
- Interchange: ▲3,995
Location
Notes
- Passenger statistics from the Office of Rail and Road

Horsforth railway station serves the town of Horsforth in West Yorkshire, England. It is a stop on the Harrogate Line, 5.75 miles (9 km) north-west of Leeds, and is the final stop in the West Yorkshire Metro regulated area towards Harrogate.

== History ==
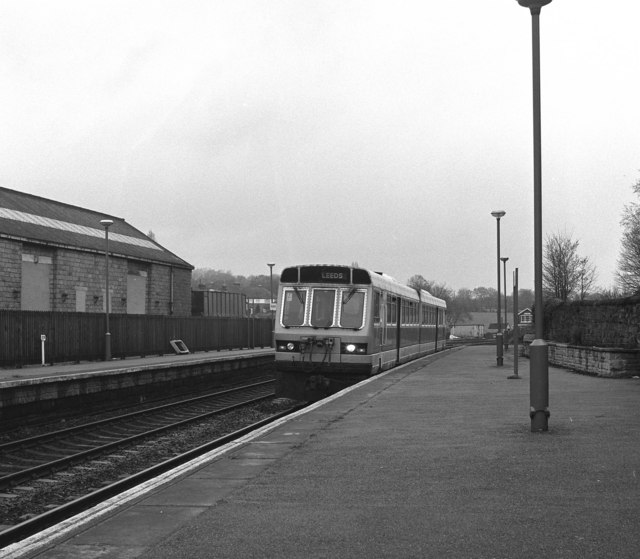
The station in 1988

The station, accessed from Station Road, serves Horsforth, Cookridge and Tinshill, and was opened in 1849. In 1969, staff were removed and all the buildings demolished, as part of the general retrenchment of railways in West Yorkshire at that time. However the goods shed still survives but it is incorporated in the larger DIY store. The nearby North Eastern Railway signal box survived until 2013.

Growing traffic congestion in Leeds caused an increase in patronage from Horsforth in the 1990s, and in 2002-3, Horsforth station was extensively redeveloped to better cater for the greater number of passengers. New waiting rooms were built on both platforms, along with a ticket office on the Leeds (Up) platform, which opened on 16 July 2003. The car park was extended, using land formerly occupied by the two sidings; they still remain, in a truncated form. The station is staffed from 06:10–19:00 Mon–Sat and 09:30–16:30 Sun. Ticket machines are also provided, along with a long-line P.A system and digital information screens. Step-free access is available to both platforms.

The station is roughly 45 minutes by foot from Leeds Bradford International Airport and roughly five minutes by road, but there are no direct public transport links between the two places.

There were plans for a neighbouring station, Horsforth Woodside, to be built on the same line just south of Horsforth. However, a West Yorkshire Transport Feasibility Study, published in 2015, stated that the authority would not continue with plans for the new station. A turn-back facility was constructed at Horsforth station in 2012, which will permit future timetabling improvements on the line.

== Services ==
Monday to Saturday daytimes is generally a half-hourly service stopping southbound to Leeds and the same half-hourly service northbound to York.

In peak hours, there are extra services to and from Leeds.

In the evenings there is an hourly service in each direction. As of the December 2017 timetable change, Sundays see a very frequent service. Services to York and to Leeds are now every half an hour during the day, and into the evening.

Every day there are six through London North Eastern Railway services to London King's Cross every two hours in each direction.

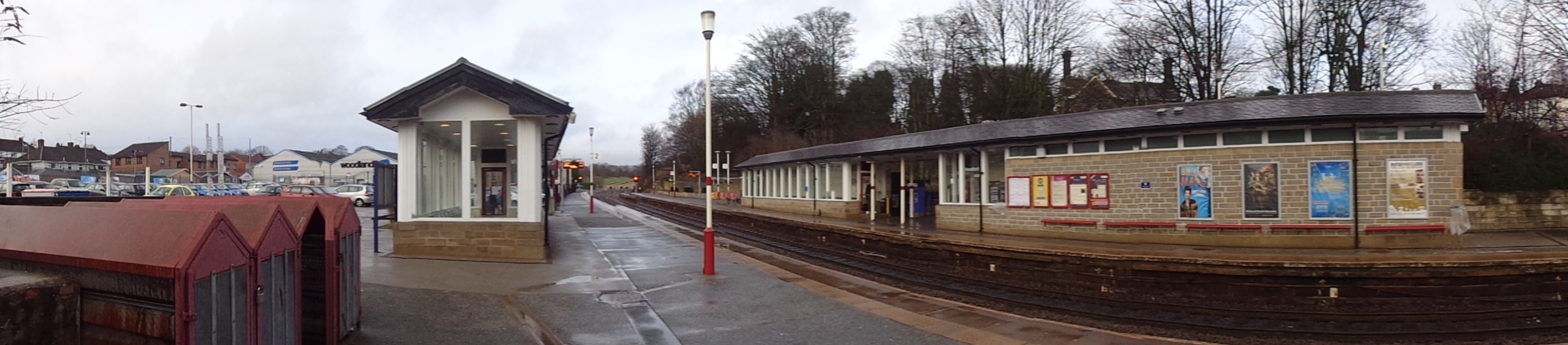
Panorama of Horsforth station

== See also ==
- Leeds-Northallerton Railway

Preceding station	National Rail	Following station
Headingley	Northern; Harrogate Line	Weeton
Leeds	London North Eastern Railway; London to Harrogate	Harrogate
