= Meanwood Valley Trail =

Walking route in Leeds, England

Coordinates: 53.8115°N 1.5568°W

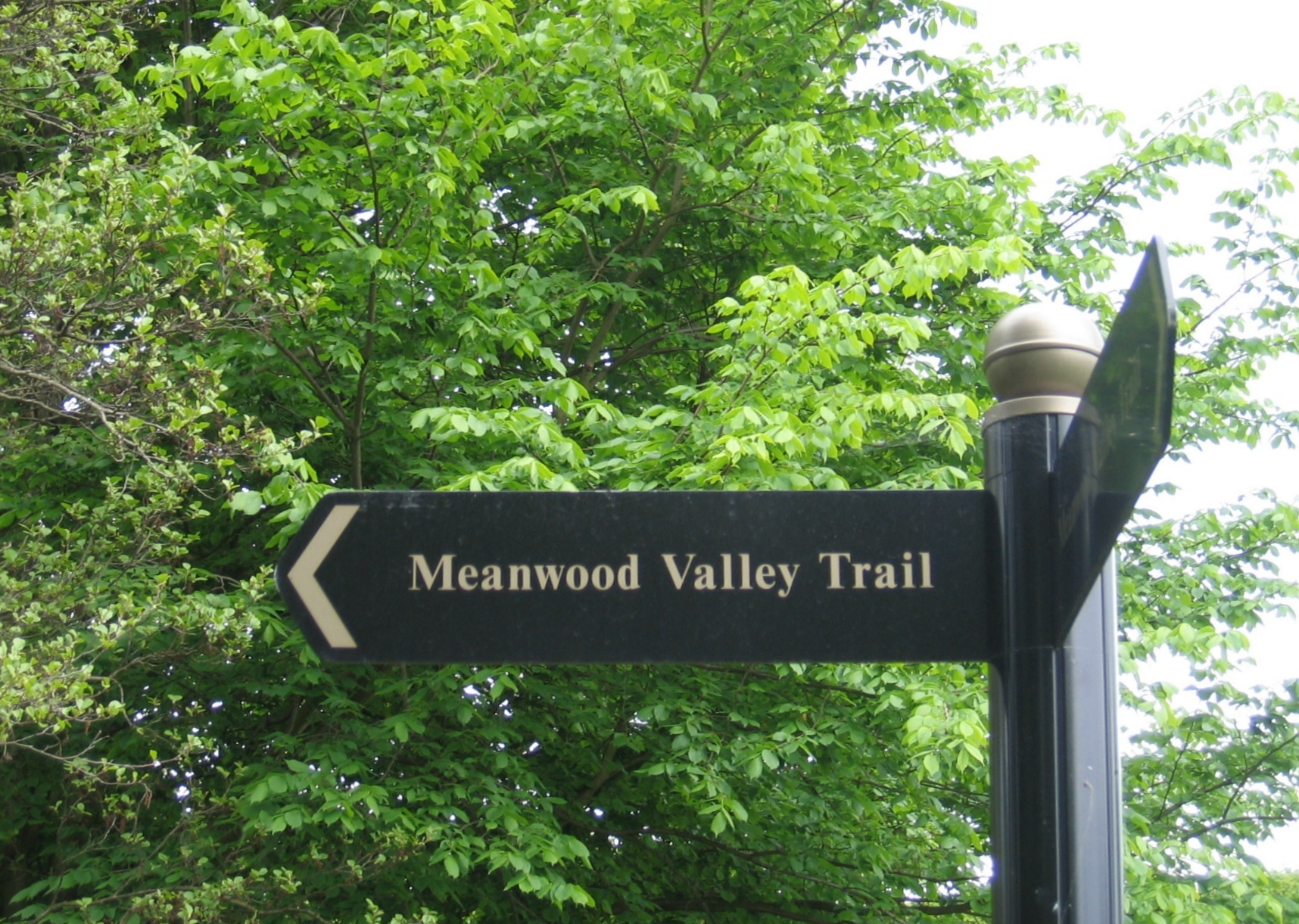
Signpost on the Meanwood Valley Trail

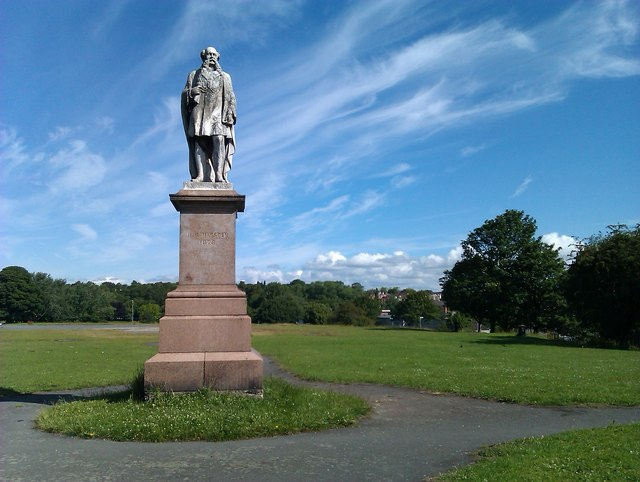
H. R. Marsden statue at the south end of the Meanwood Valley Trail

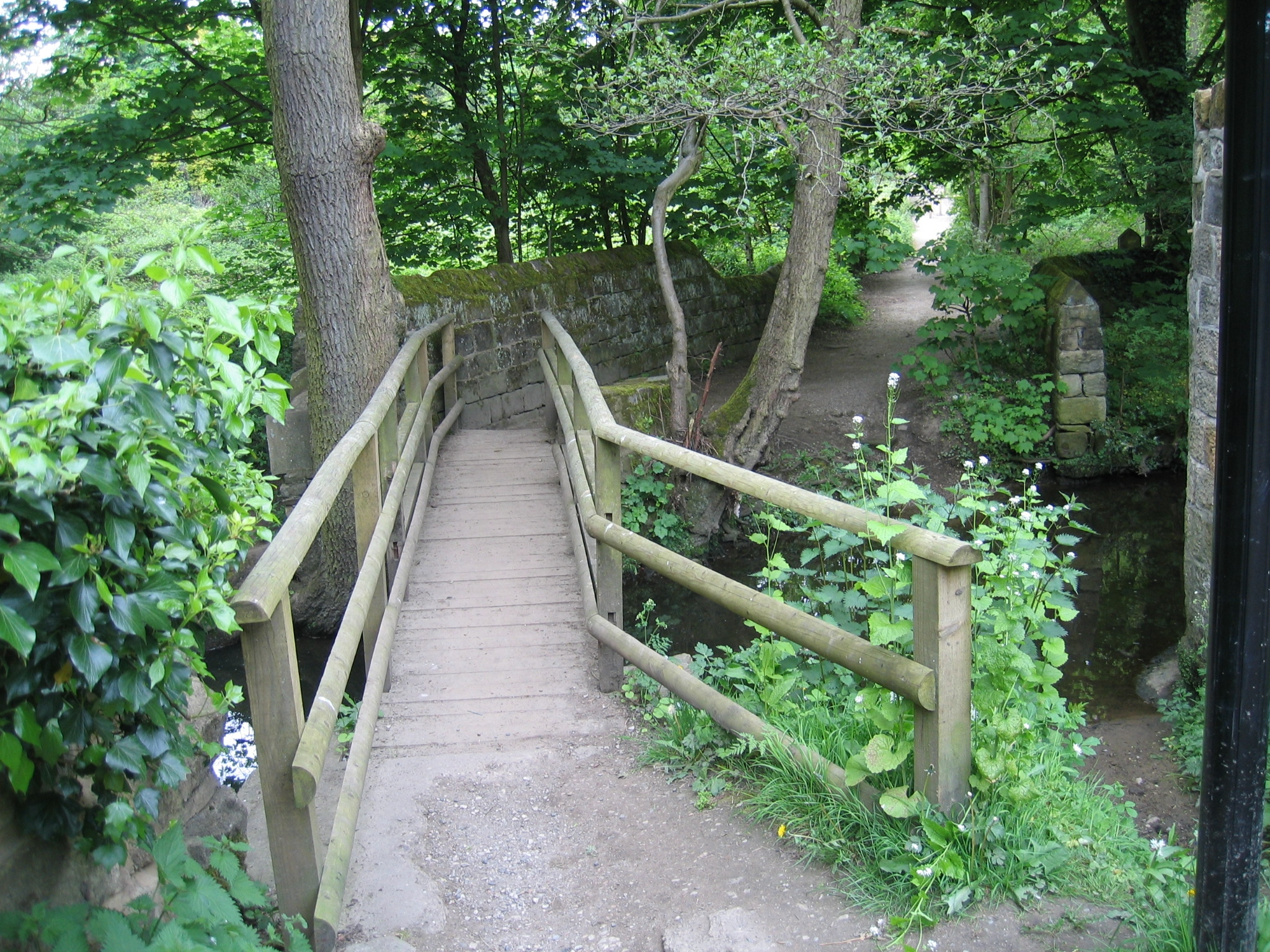
Footbridge over Meanwood Beck

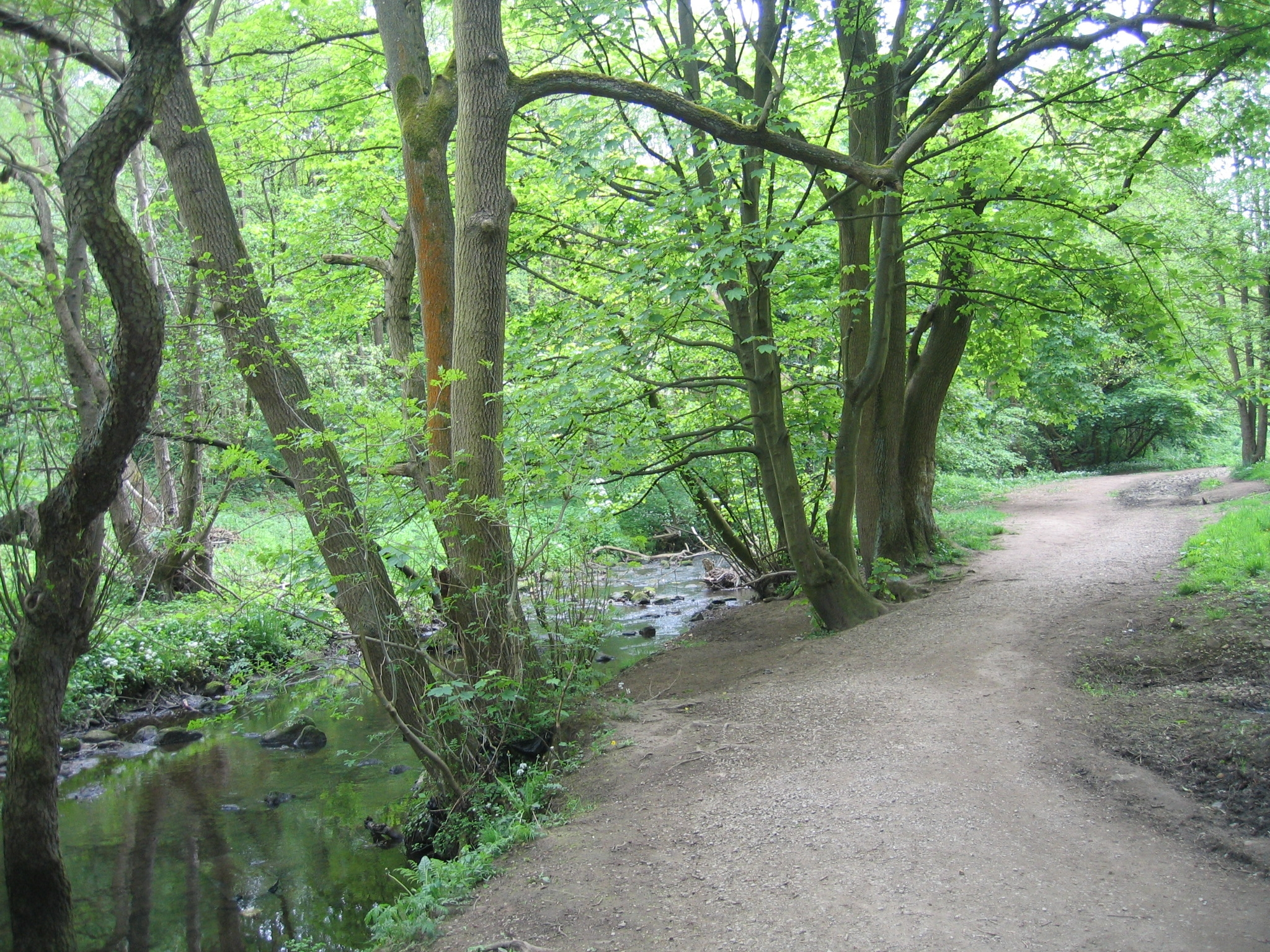
Woodlands

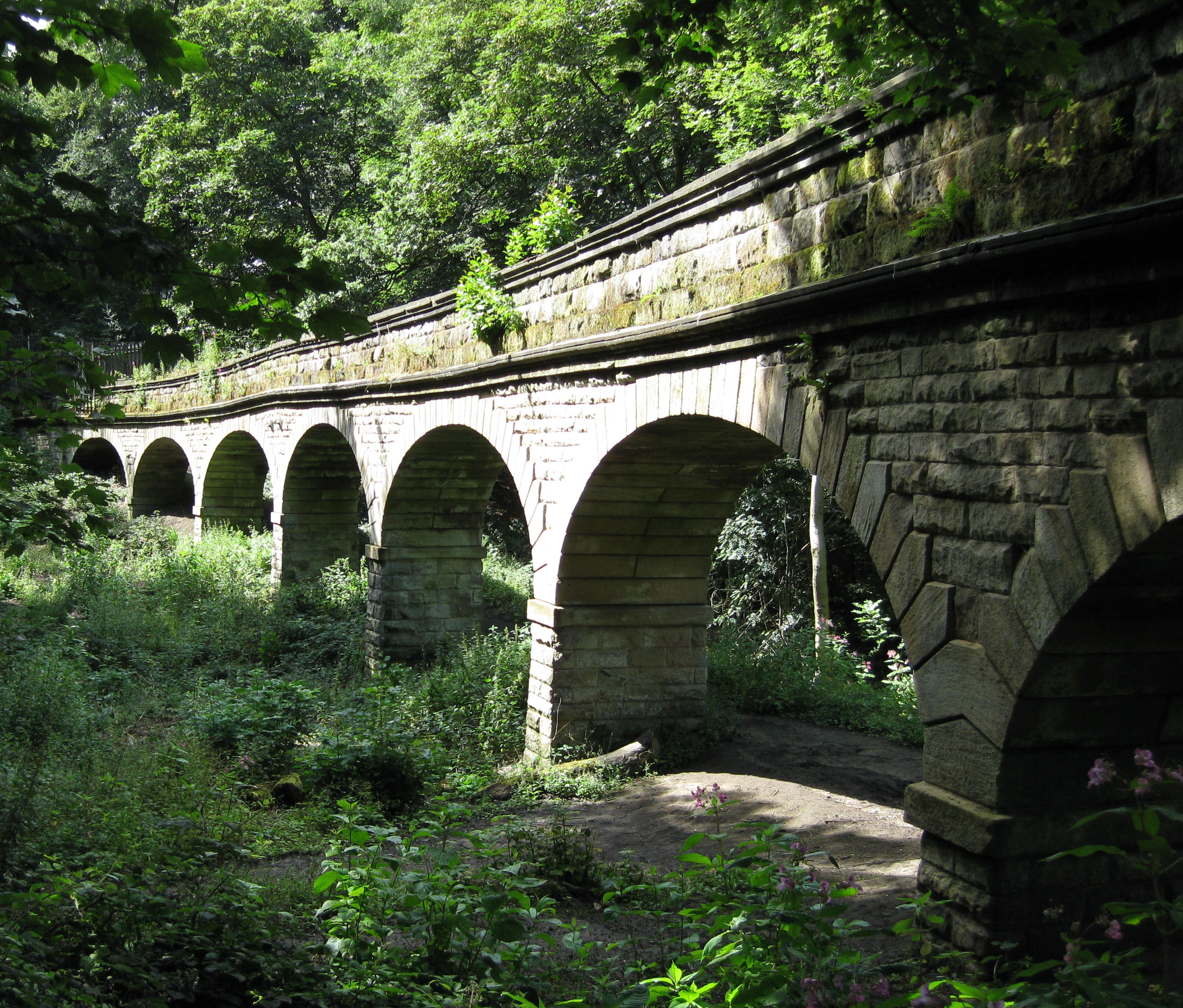
Seven Arches Aqueduct

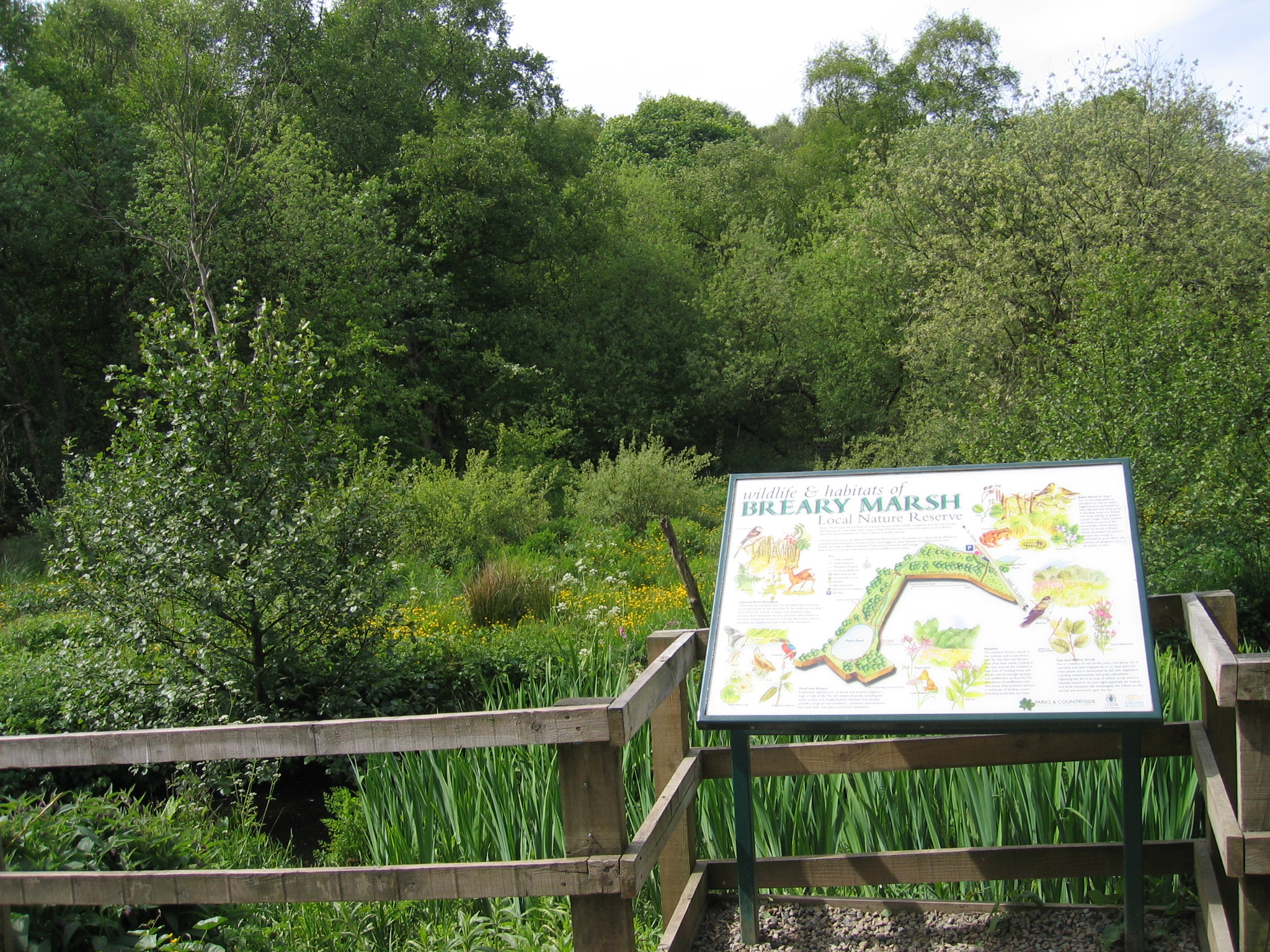
Sign at Breary Marsh at the north end of the Meanwood Valley Trail

The Meanwood Valley Trail is a waymarked footpath and the title of an annual (March/April) footrace that takes place on parts of the trail in Leeds, West Yorkshire, England. It runs for a distance of 7 miles (11 km) from the statue of (former Leeds mayor) Henry Rowland Marsden, 1878, on Woodhouse Moor, close to the University of Leeds, through Headingley, Meanwood and Adel to Breary Marsh, Golden Acre Park, where it meets the Leeds Country Way. For most of its route (to King Lane) it is the official Leeds link to the Dales Way. Along the way are signs giving information about the local wildlife. The first stages of the White Rose Way follow part of the trail also before continuing to Scarborough.

Some of the upper reaches of the trail are used for an annual trail running race each March/April, organised by local running club the Valley Striders. This race has over 300 participants each year and is part of the Airedale Triple, which also includes the Baildon Boundary Way and the Guiseley Gallop.

== Route ==
The path is waymarked in both directions and can be started at any point, but is described here northwards from the Marsden Statue on Woodhouse Moor divided into parts and sections which correspond with the old edition of the official map a new one which includes minor route changes was produced in 2013.

The path starts at the statue of Henry Marsden on Woodhouse Moor. It follows Woodhouse Ridge to Meanwood Beck, passes Meanwood Tannery, now converted to residential flats and some allotments, then reaches the picnic area of Meanwood Park. The path goes through the park and along the beck, to reach the Ring Road. It takes a tunnel under the Ring Road and enters Scotland Woods, where the stone remains of Scotland Mill's dam can be seen, and continues to the Seven Arches Aqueduct and passes near Adel Crag. The path follows Stairfoot Lane and King Lane to reach Golden Acre Park, where the path reaches the lake and goes either left or right around the lake to reach an underpass which goes under the Otley Road to Breary Marsh local nature reserve, the end of the trail.
