= Breary Marsh =

Nature reserve in Leeds, West Yorkshire, England

Coordinates: 53.8705°N 1.5960°W

Breary Marsh is a Local Nature Reserve and Site of Special Scientific Interest situated adjacent to Golden Acre Park in Leeds, West Yorkshire, England, grid reference SE264416.

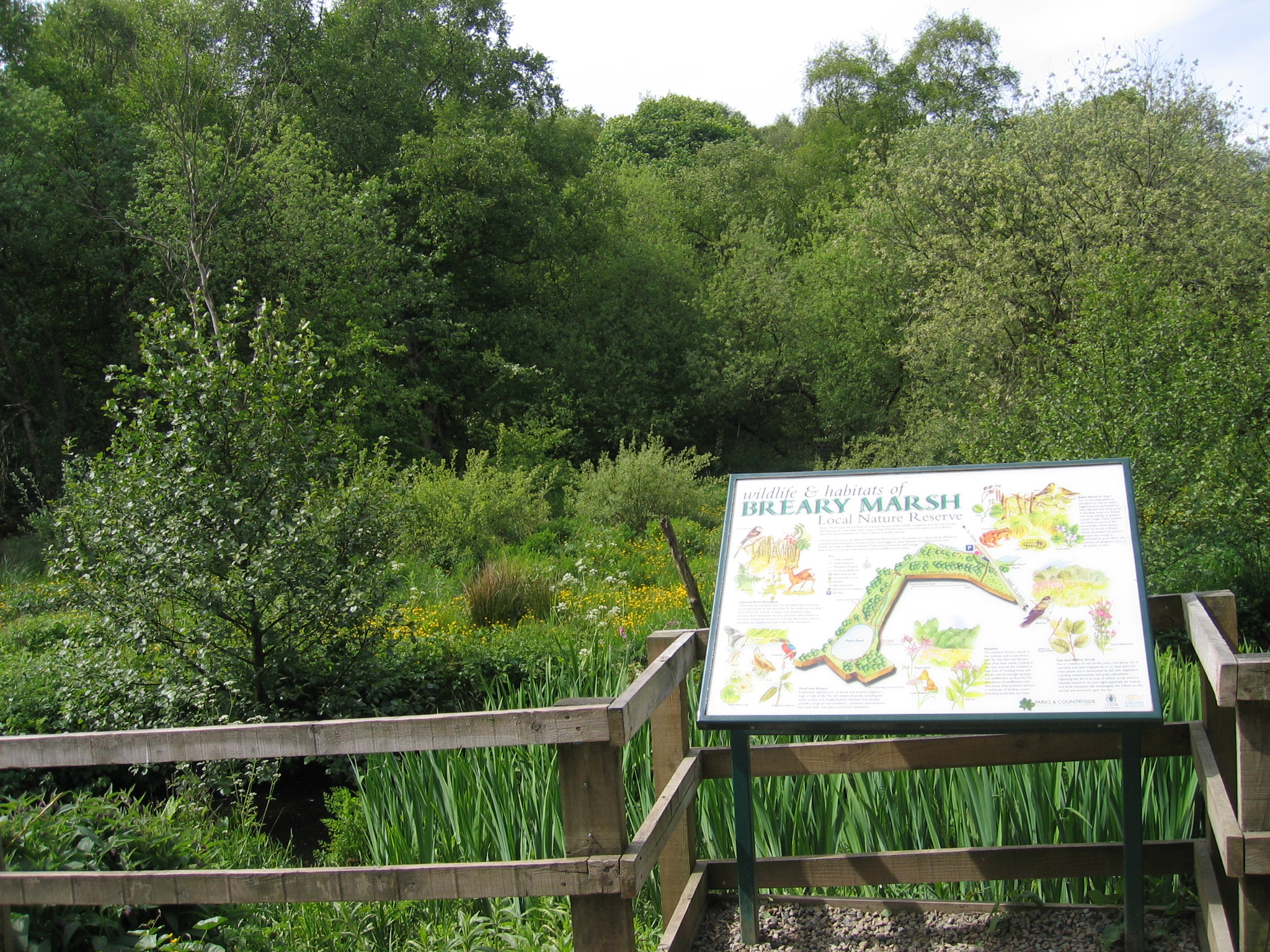
Breary Marsh

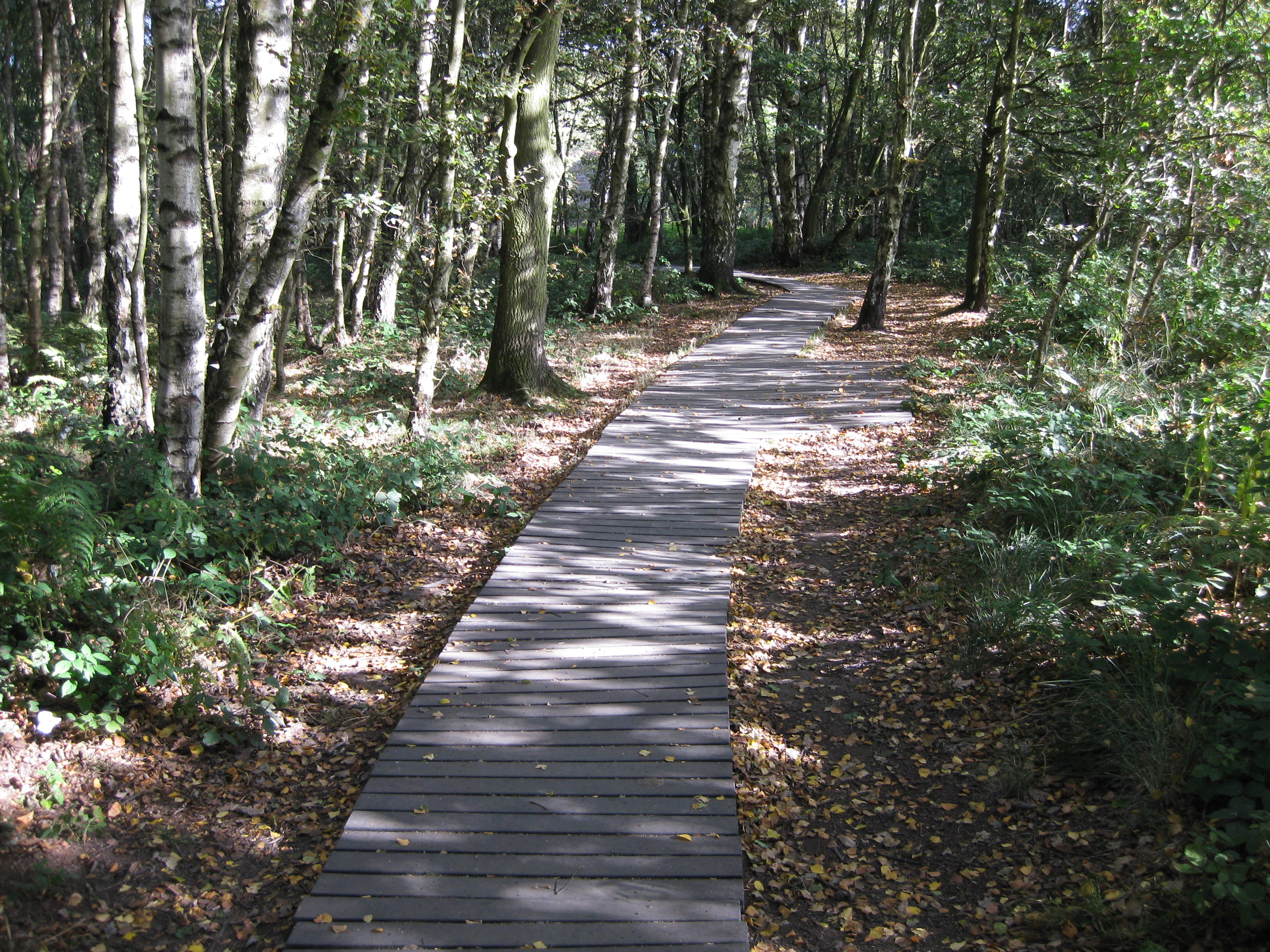
Wooden walkway

== Geography ==
As the name suggests, it includes an area of marshland, but also a wet alder valley wood and former birch coppice. It is said to be "a representative example of a wet valley alderwood and associated flood plain fen communities and is the most diverse example known in the county". Wooden walkways are provided over marshy areas. It is part of the Leeds Country Way and the north end of the Meanwood Valley Trail.

A lake at the southern end of the reserve, known as Paul's Pond, was formerly a fish pond belonging to the nearby Cookridge Hall estate. It is named after William Paul, who bought the estate in 1890.

The site is situated between Lawnswood and Bramhope off the A660 Otley Road. The adjacent park has a large car park and buses run close by from Leeds, Skipton and Otley.

== Etymology ==
The place-name Breary is first attested in the twelfth century, in the forms Brerehag, Brerehagh, and Brerehage. The early forms come from the Old English words brēr ('briar') and haga ('enclosure, hedge'). However, later forms, including the modern name, show replacement of the second element with a related word of similar meaning: Old English hæg ('fence, enclosure'). In both variants, the name meant 'enclosure characterised by briars'. For a time the western part of the settlement so named was called West Breary, first attested in 1549 as 'West Brerry'.

== Land ownership ==
All land within Breary Marsh SSSI is owned by the local authority.
