= Leeds Country Way =

Long-distance footpath, West Yorkshire, England

Coordinates: 53.871°N 1.593°W

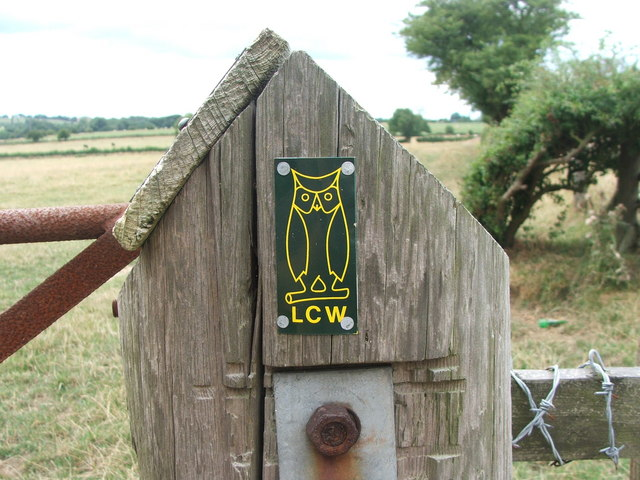
- LCW waymarker near Wike
- Length: 62 mi (100 km)
- Location: Leeds, West Yorkshire, England
- Trailheads: Circular walk, accessible by bus or train at many points
- Use: Hiking, running
- Difficulty: Easy: some short hills and can be muddy in places
- Season: All year
- Hazards: Crosses some busy roads

The Leeds Country Way (LCW) is a circular long-distance footpath of 62 miles (100 km) around Leeds in West Yorkshire, England. It is never more than 7 miles (11 km) from the city centre of Leeds, but is mainly rural with extensive views in the outlying areas of the Leeds metropolitan district. It follows public rights of way including footpaths, bridleways and minor lanes, with a few short sections along roads. It can be walked in sections, accessed from roads with public transport links, but has also been completed by a runner in less than 11 hours.

== History ==
A route was first devised by Fred Andrews of the Ramblers Association, and then developed by West Yorkshire County Council in the early 1980s. This council was abolished in 1986, and the path is now under the care of the countryside section of Leeds City Council. The Leeds Country Way was realigned in 2006, using a route devised by Bob Brewster, to bring it entirely within the boundary of the Leeds metropolitan district (previously it crossed the boundary into Wakefield district), and the path was officially relaunched on 26 September 2006 with a revised set of map leaflets and improved waymarking.

The Leeds Country Way was mentioned in the House of Commons when Colin Burgon gave his maiden speech as the newly elected MP for Elmet: he said "Some hon. Members use their maiden speeches to boost the tourism prospects of their constituencies. I advise a walk along the Leeds Country Way, which criss-crosses my constituency; people would soon realise how pleasant Elmet is."

As of 2025 the fastest known time for completion of the Leeds Country Way is 10 h 41m 18s, by runner Chin Yong on 7 May 2021, running unsupported but having cached bottles of water and energy food along the route.

== Route ==
The path extends to 62 miles (100 km) in an orbital route around Leeds, never more than 7 miles (11 km) from the city centre. It is waymarked in both directions and can be started at any point, but the city council's documentation describes it in a clockwise direction, starting the A660 road at Golden Acre Park (grid reference SE267417), and the description below follows that pattern, dividing the route into four parts of about 15 miles (24 km), each subdivided into three sections ending at points with road access.

=== Part 1: Golden Acre to Barwick-in-Elmet ===
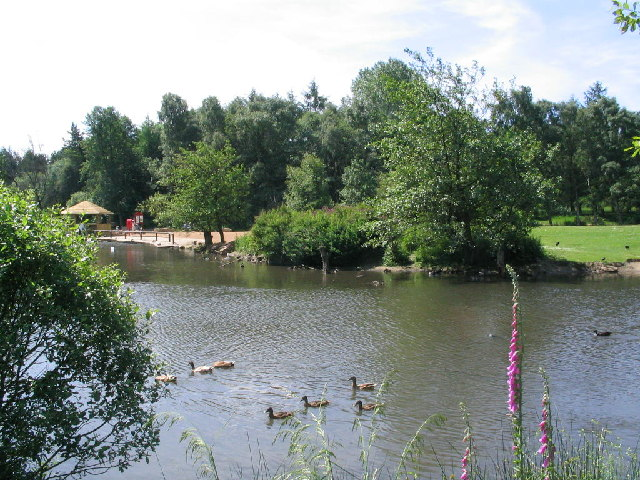
Golden Acre Park

Section 1: the path crosses Golden Acre Park and passes the Yorkshire Wildlife Trust's Adel Dam Nature Reserve, following the route of the Meanwood Valley Trail. It coincides briefly with the Leeds link to the Dales Way north of Eccup Reservoir, before crossing the Ebor Way and entering the Harewood House estate. Here there is a glimpse of what looks like a small village, not marked on any map, but which is actually the set for the TV series Emmerdale. Walkers may also see red kites which have been successfully reintroduced in this area.

Section 2: after crossing the A61 road, the path passes north of Wike and reaches the village of Bardsey with its Anglo-Saxon church tower and the Bingley Arms public house, which claims to be the oldest in England. The path turns south, crossing the A58, to Scarcroft.

Section 3: the path continues through Thorner, crossing the A64 road before entering Barwick-in-Elmet (SE398376) with England's tallest maypole, a Norman motte and an Iron Age fort.

=== Part 2: Barwick-in-Elmet to Carlton ===
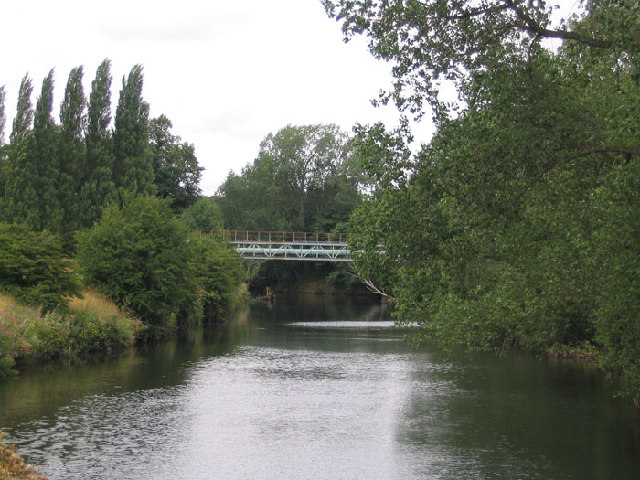
River Aire at Swillington

Section 1: from Barwick the path passes the southern corner of Scholes, then crosses the M1 motorway and enters Garforth.

Section 2: it leaves Garforth along the disused Garforth-Kippax railway line (part of the North Eastern Railway and earlier the Leeds, Castleford and Pontefract Junction Railway), then approaches Swillington and passes Little Preston Old Hall. It skirts St Aidan's Country Park, and crosses the River Aire at Swillington Bridge. The path follows the river downstream, past the marina at Fleet Bridge.

Section 3: the path continues along the river, here forming the Aire and Calder Navigation, to Mickletown, and then turns south to Methley. It swings eastward, crosses the A642 road and continues to Carlton (SE337272), in the West Yorkshire Rhubarb Triangle.

=== Part 3: Carlton to Cockersdale ===
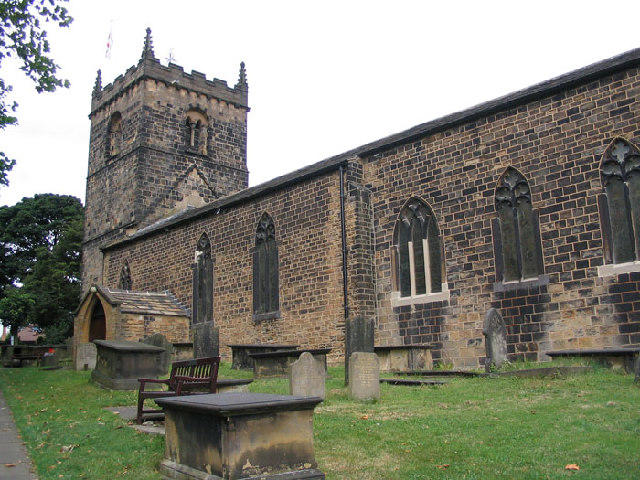
Woodkirk church

Section 1: from Carlton the path crosses fields before briefly joining the A61 road and recrossing the M1 motorway south of Robin Hood. It turns south across the M62 motorway, follows the valley of Dolphin Beck, and reaches East Ardsley on the A650 road.

Section 2: from here the path skirts south of West Ardsley, and reaches Woodkirk with its historic church, on the A653 road. It passes the ruins of Howley Hall (built 1590 for Sir John Savile) before dropping down to reach Scotchman Lane.

Section 3: a track through Birkby Brow Wood, just inside the Leeds-Kirklees boundary, leads to the A643 road, which is followed to recross the M62. The path's longest section of road walking follows the A650 through Gildersome, then a series of field paths leads to Cockersdale (SE233297), on the A58 road near Tong.

=== Part 4: Cockersdale to Golden Acre ===
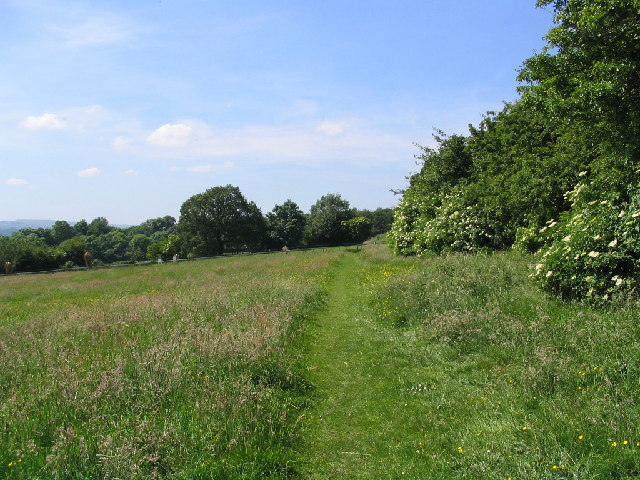
LCW near Horsforth

Section 1: the path follows the valley of Cockersdale, and then goes along Tong Beck, below Fulneck Moravian Settlement, skirting the south of Pudsey. At this point Tong Beck forms the Leeds-Bradford boundary. The path crosses the Leeds to Bradford railway and meets the busy A647 road at Thornbury.

Section 2: passing playing fields and old quarries, the path crosses the Woodhall Hills and follows Fagley Beck to cross the Leeds and Liverpool Canal and the River Aire at Apperley Bridge, then follows the river past Woodhouse Grove School before climbing up to meet the A65 road south of Rawdon.

Section 3: from here the path skirts Horsforth, follows for a time the southern boundary of Leeds Bradford Airport, and goes round the northern edge of Cookridge, before crossing Breary Marsh, a local nature reserve, to return to Golden Acre Park (SE267417).

== Practical aspects ==
As the route is circular it can be started at any point, but the description in the official leaflets starts and finishes at Golden Acre Park, going clockwise. These divide it into four parts each split into three sections, but walkers can choose to divide it in various ways as there are many bus routes and several railway stations (Woodlesford, Garforth, New Pudsey and Horsforth) on or near the path. West Yorkshire Metro provides information about bus routes serving the path and train services in the area.

Ordnance Survey maps mark and name the route of the path. The sheets covering the route are:

- Landranger 1:50,000 sheet 104 (Leeds: covers almost the whole route) and 105 (York: needed for a short distance near Garforth)
- Explorer 1:25,000 sheets 289 (Leeds: Golden Acre Park clockwise to Scotchman Lane) and 288 (Bradford: Scotchman Lane clockwise to Golden Acre Park).

The route is waymarked with an owl symbol, outlined in yellow, and the letters "LCW" in yellow, on a green background. Owls are included in the coat of arms of Leeds, and are found in many pieces of public art in the city centre.

The original route of the path is used for an annual trail running relay race organised by Kippax Harriers. Teams of twelve, with two runners taking each of six sections, complete the route in about seven hours.
