= Leeds Road (disambiguation) =

Leeds Road is a former football and rugby league stadium in Huddersfield, West Yorkshire, England.

Leeds Road may also refer to:

- A660 road, West Yorkshire, England, between Golden Acre Park and the Otley bypass
- Leeds Inner Ring Road, a motorway in Leeds, West Yorkshire, England
- Leeds Outer Ring Road, a main road around Leeds, West Yorkshire, England
