= Golden Acre Park =

Park in Leeds, England

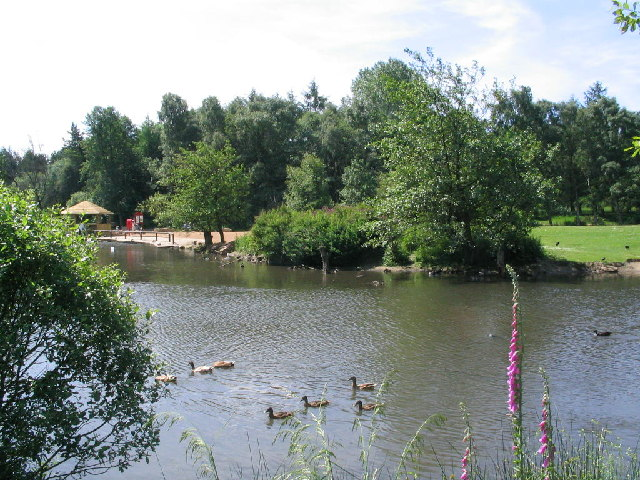
- Wildfowl Lake, Golden Acre Park
- Interactive map of Golden Acre Park
- Type: Parkland, woodland, gardens
- Location: Otley Road, Bramhope, Leeds, West Yorkshire, England
- Coordinates: 53°52′13″N 1°35′28″W
- Area: 179 acres (72 ha)
- Operator: Leeds City Council
- Open: All year
- Website: www.leeds.gov.uk/parks-and-countryside/major-parks/golden-acre-park/

Golden Acre Park is a public park in Bramhope, Leeds, West Yorkshire, England (grid reference SE267417), administered by Leeds City Council. It is on the A660 Otley Road and covers an area of 179 acres (72 ha).

== History ==
The park opened as a privately run amusement park in 1932 with a miniature railway, swimming pool and boating lake, but closed during the Second World War to be used for military training. It was taken over by the Council in 1945. The lake was formed by damming Adel Beck and was larger than at present. The council filled in much of the lake up to the A660 with rubble from demolished buildings in the city and fly ash from Kirkstall power station.

== Location ==
The park is on the east side of the A660 road. On the west side is a car park and Breary Marsh nature reserve, with a pedestrian tunnel under the road joining them to the main park. The Leeds Country Way passes through the park, and the Meanwood Valley Trail links the park to Woodhouse Moor.

== Attractions and facilities ==
The park has a lake with wildfowl, informal gardens, demonstration gardens, and woodland and open spaces. The gardens contain the National Plant Collections of Lilac, Hosta and Hemerocallis.

Facilities include a cafe (with indoor and outdoor seating), a number of benches, a bird feeding shelter and numerous picnic benches. The park is usually well kept all year round.

The Adel Dam nature reserve, owned by the Yorkshire Wildlife Trust, is adjacent to the eastern side of the park.

== Gallery ==
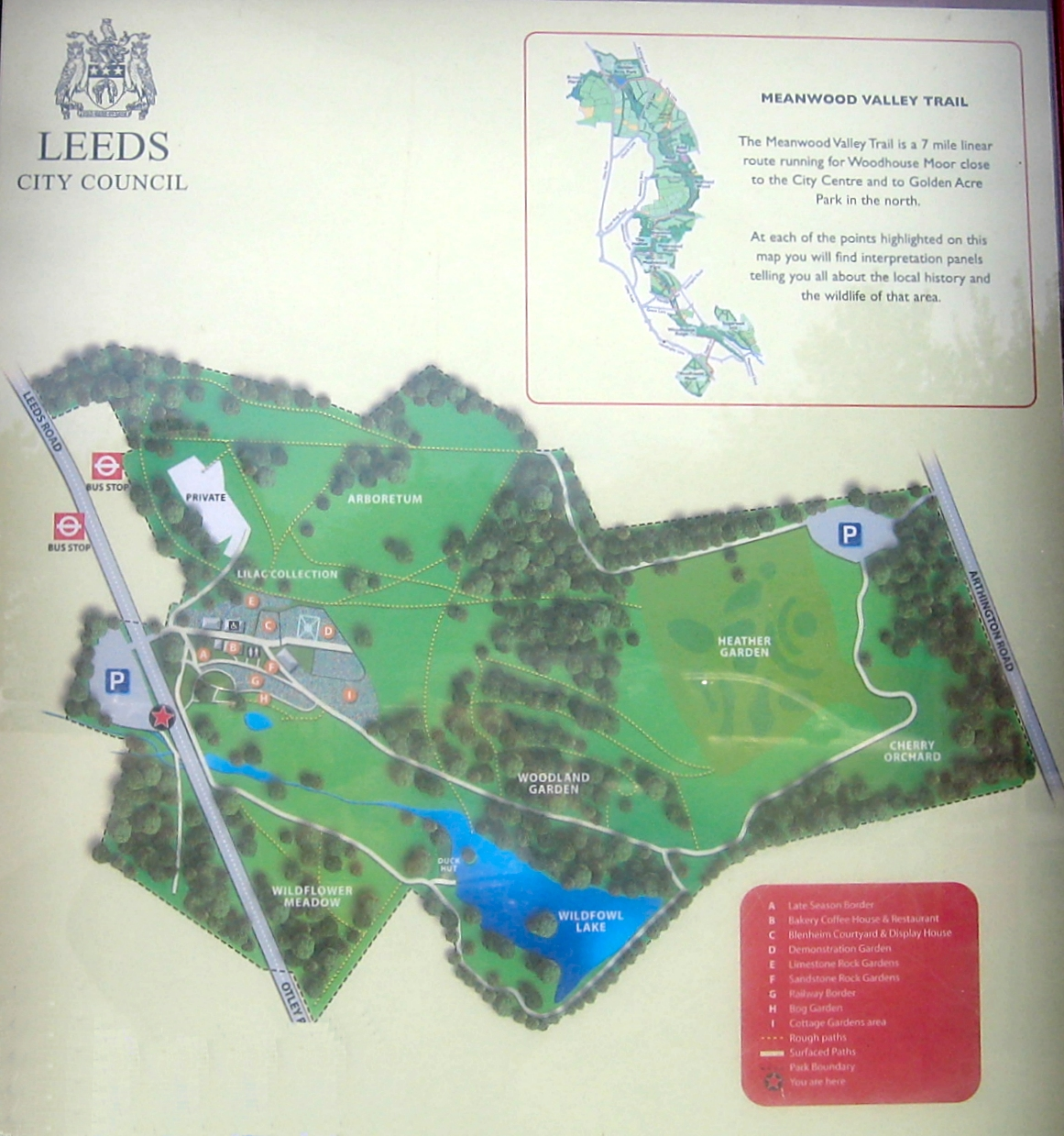
Golden Acre Park map sign

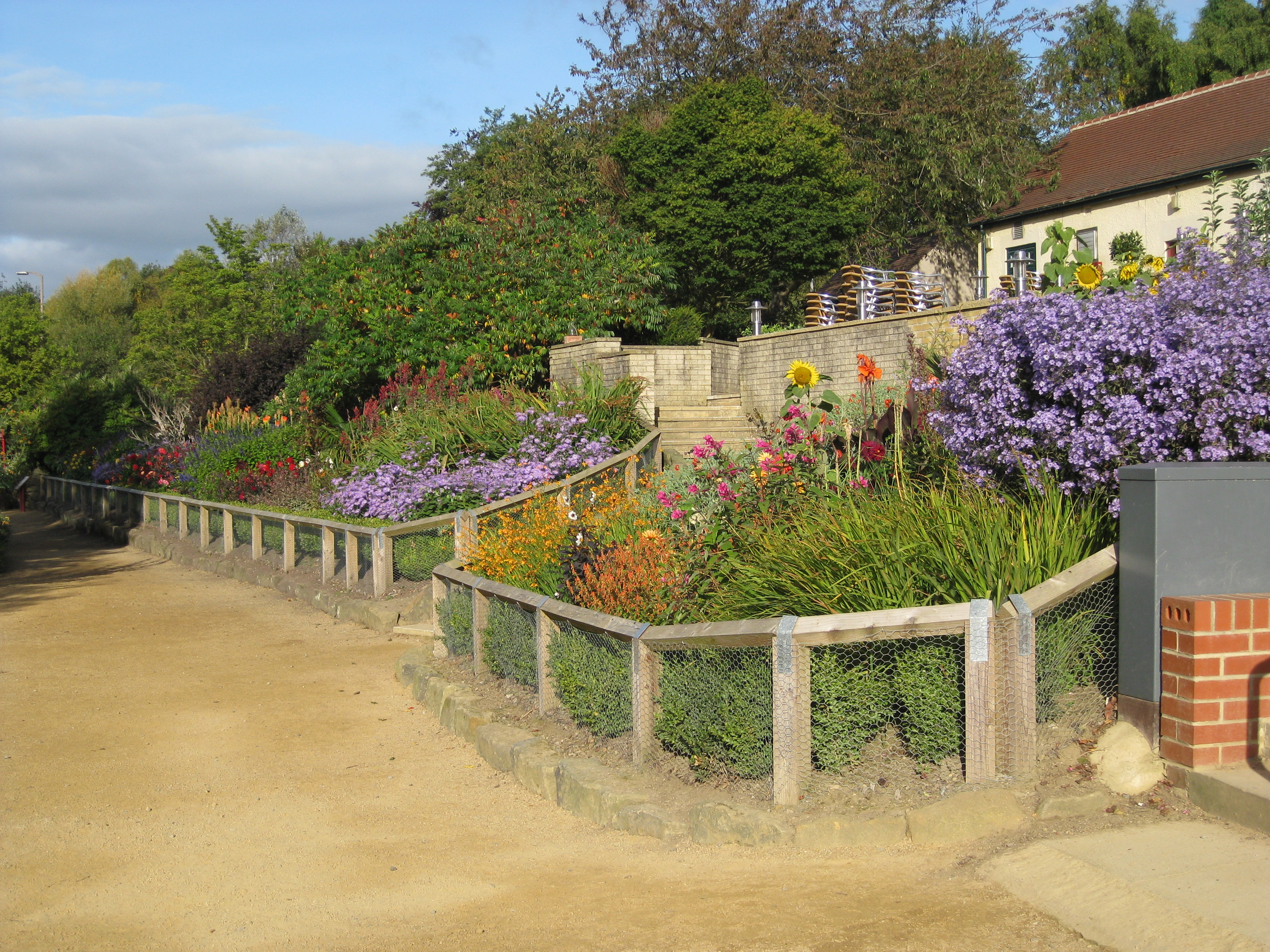
Bakehouse Border

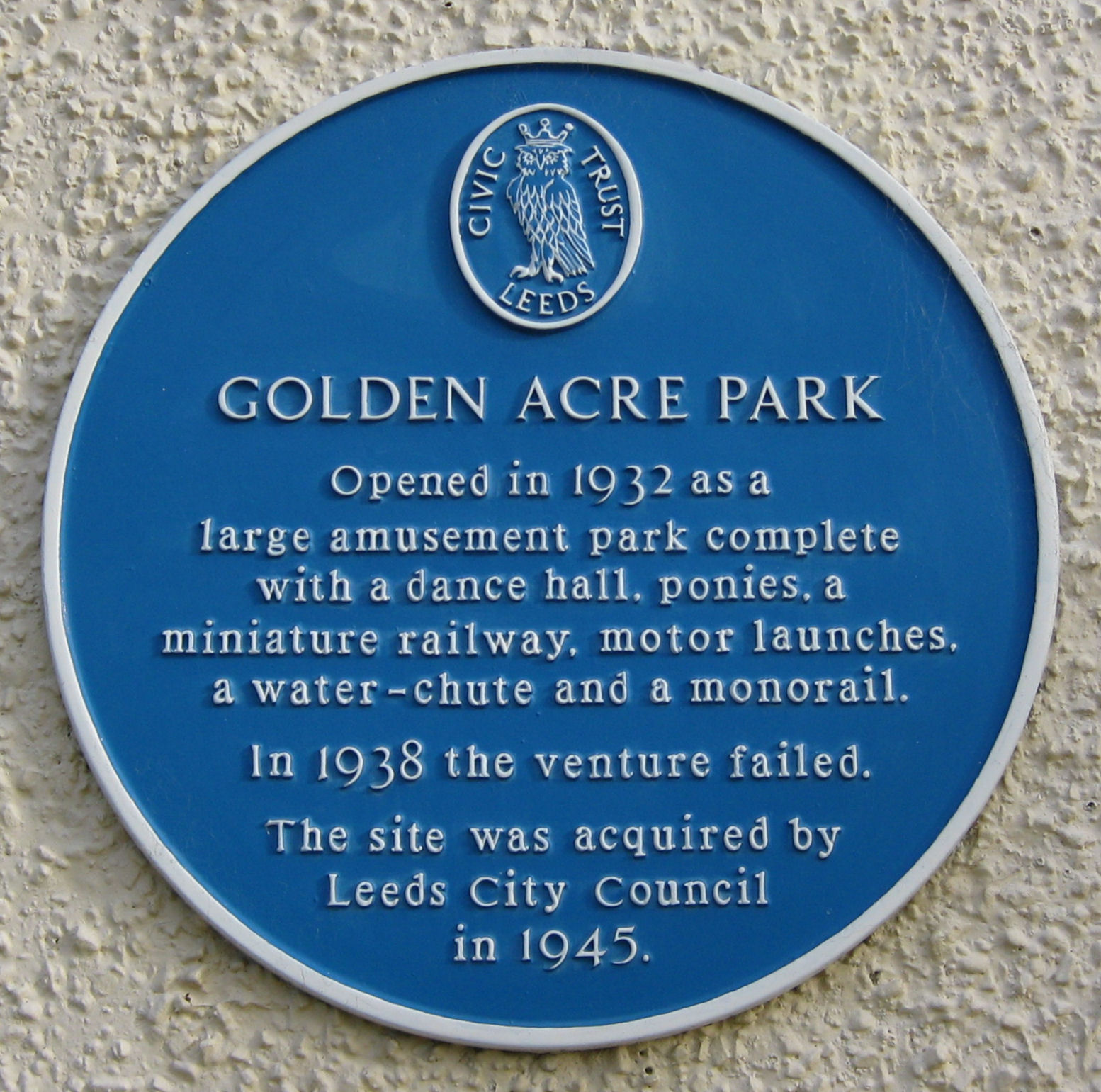
Leeds Civic Trust blue plaque

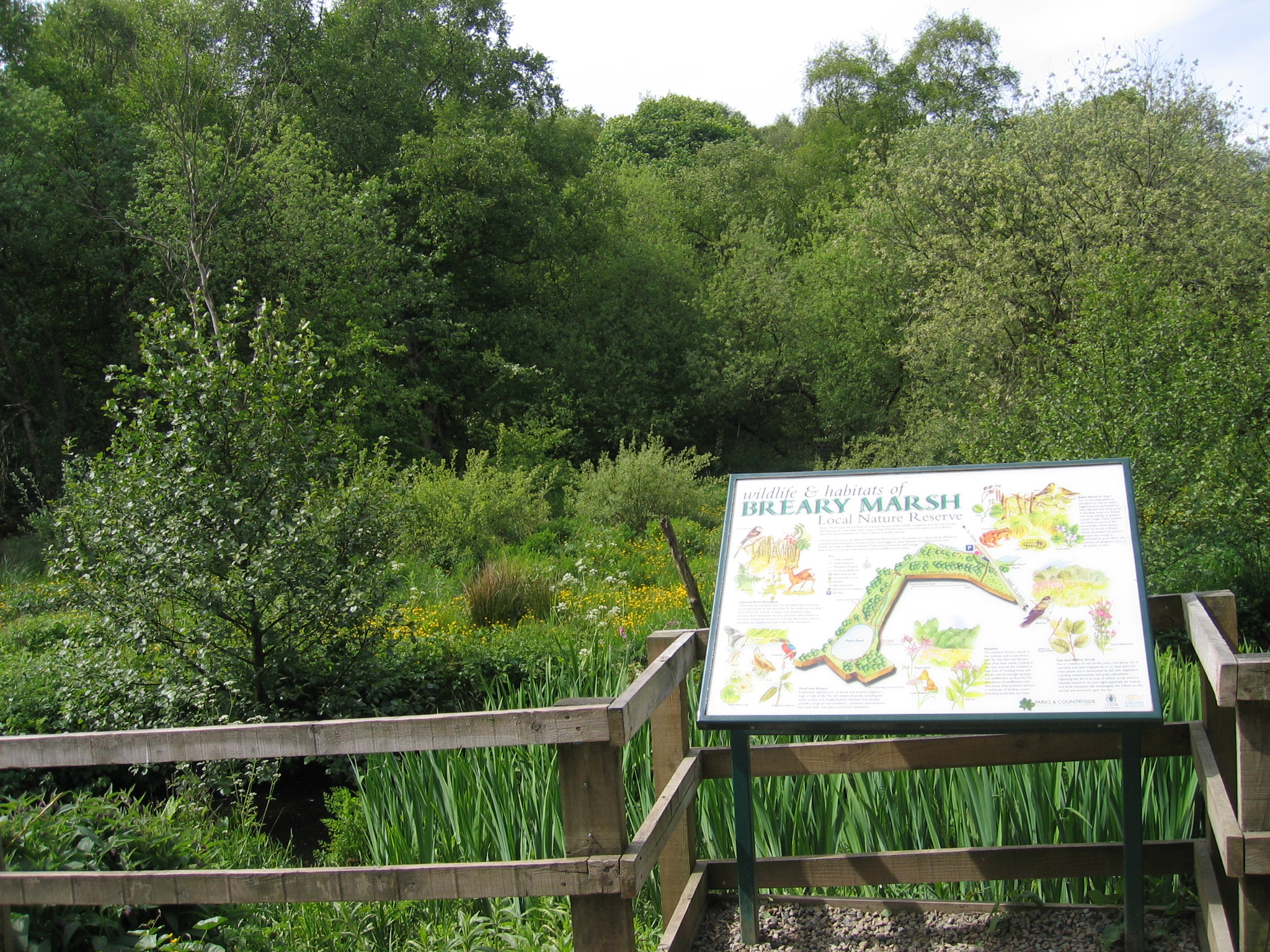
Breary Marsh nature reserve
