= Woodhouse Moor =

Park in Leeds, England

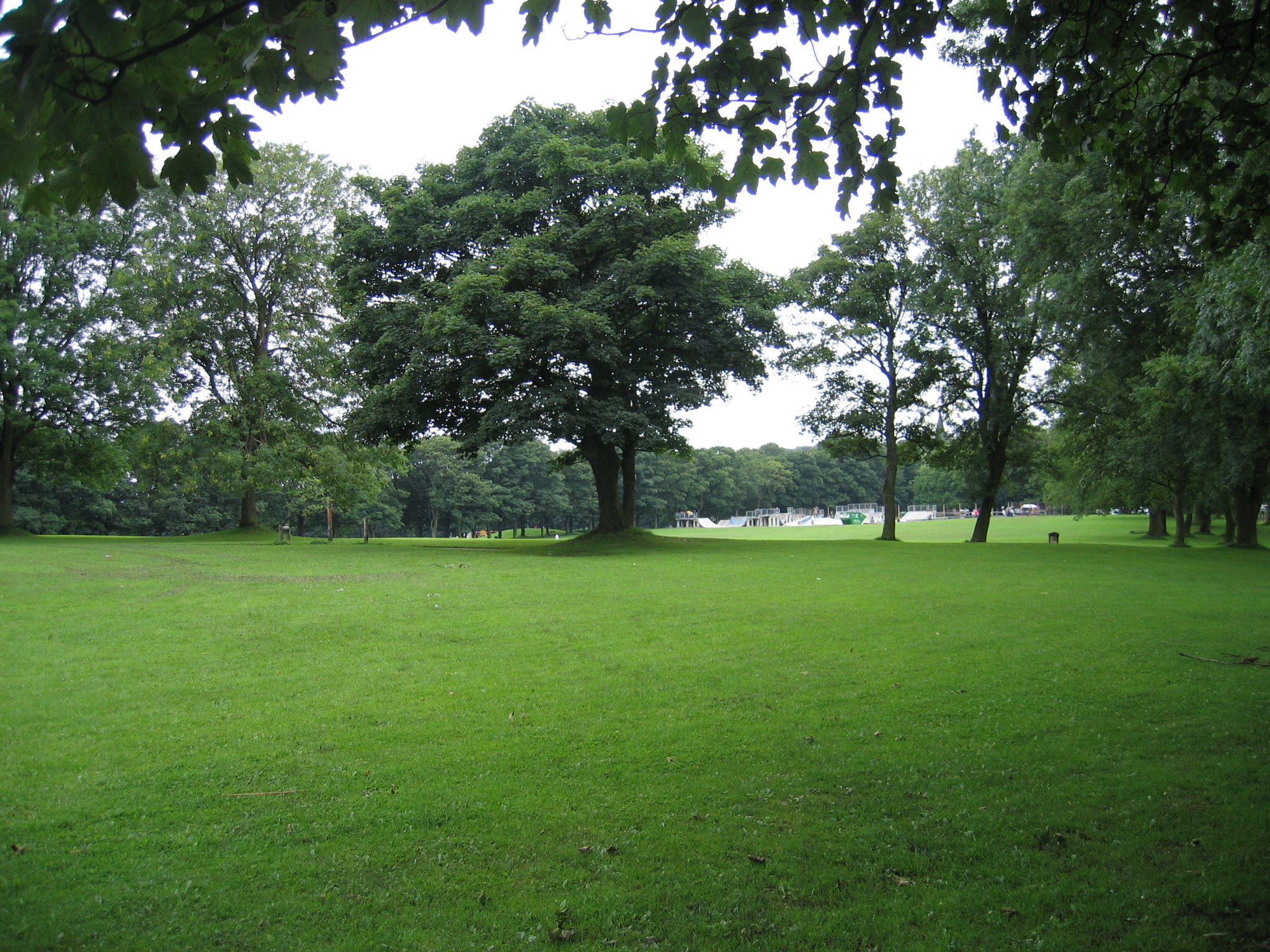
- Woodhouse Moor Park
- Interactive map of Woodhouse Moor
- Type: Parkland, woodland, gardens
- Location: Leeds, West Yorkshire, England
- Coordinates: 53°48′39″N 1°33′40″W
- Area: 26 hectares (64 acres)
- Created: 1857
- Operator: Leeds City Council
- Status: Open all year

Woodhouse Moor is an open space approximately one mile (1.6 km) from Leeds city centre, West Yorkshire, England. Today it consists of 3 parts: a formal park, Woodhouse Moor (often referred to as Hyde Park - see below), of around 26 hectares in area on the west of Woodhouse Lane (the A660), and two other open areas on the east of it. These are known as the Monument More (or Upper) and Cinder More (or Gravel, or Lower) Moors which are used for events such as circuses and sporting matches, and sometimes car parking. Woodhouse Moor is north-west of Leeds city centre and is bounded by Woodhouse, the University of Leeds, Burley, Hyde Park, and Headingley.

As of 2005 the park had just under 3 million visits a year and is the second most popular urban park in Leeds. The park has five main paths which meet in the centre, each is tree-lined and they divide the park into different areas of usage.

In the New Year Honours 2009, Head Gardener John Egan was awarded an MBE for services to the community.

== History ==
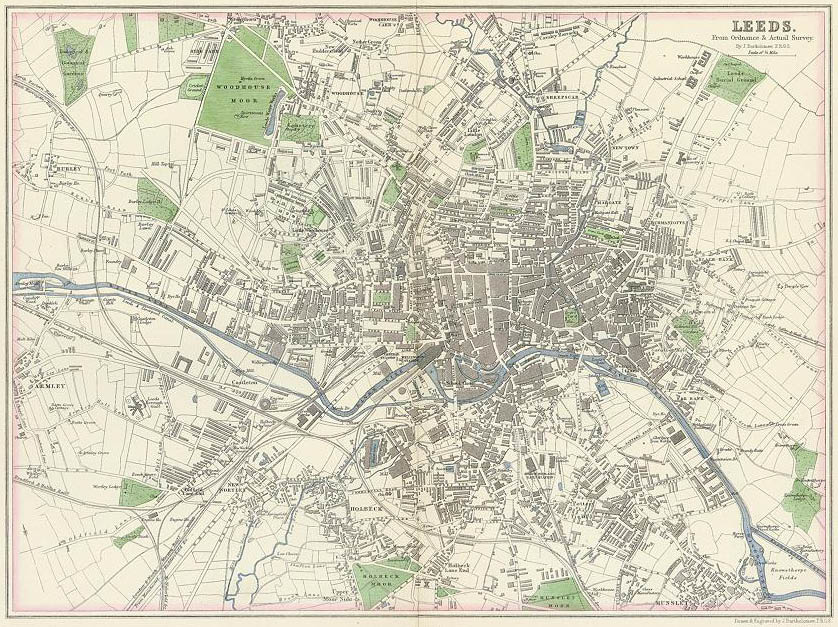
1866 Leeds Map showing Woodhouse Moor top left

The park was once part of a much larger moor of the same name, including land now occupied by the University of Leeds. At a relatively high position above Leeds, it has been a military rallying point, and Rampart Road is named after the ramparts which were once there. During the English Civil War, in 1642, Parliamentary forces led by Thomas Fairfax massed on Woodhouse Moor before taking Leeds from the royalists. The plague broke out in Leeds, in 1644, where it raged for a year and 20% of its population died. Many of the inhabitants fled from the town, to cabins hastily built on Woodhouse Moor and other open grounds, to escape the ravages of the disease.

The land was acquired by Leeds Corporation for the sum of £3,000 on 19 May 1857. Clarendon Road, which runs alongside Woodhouse Moor, used to be Reservoir Street because of a reservoir belonging to Leeds Corporation Waterworks. The reservoir was begun in 1837, after cholera epidemics swept Leeds in 1832, and was covered over in 1863. Two stone lodges were built alongside the reservoir in 1840; one still stands (The Keepers Lodge) near the Victoria Monument); the other was converted into an observatory in 1906, and subsequently demolished.

In 1858 Queen Victoria, in Leeds for the opening of the Town Hall, visited the Moor and listened to 26,000 Sunday School children sing hymns as the teachers tried to control them using placards with instructions such as 'Prepare to Cheer', 'Sing', 'Silence', and 'Dismiss'.

The road north of Woodhouse Moor Park is called Hyde Park road, indicating the former name. As with Hyde Park, London this was a place where crowds would gather to hear public speakers, on specially built platforms.

In the beginning of the 20th century, there were extensive pleasure gardens and features such as a bandstand and (from 1919) a First World War tank. With the Second World War, the tank was melted down and the Moor given over to more utilitarian purposes such as air raid shelters and allotments (some of which still exist). In 1937 some statues were moved from the centre of Leeds, to the Moor, including those of Queen Victoria and Sir Henry Marsden.

The Moor was one of the locations of the Festival of Britain in 1951, opened by the Princess Royal (Mary, Princess Royal, the daughter of King George V and aunt of the future Queen Elizabeth II).

== Statues ==
There are several Victorian statues in the park: near the Woodhouse Lane, Clarendon Road junction is the Victoria Monument, by George Frampton, which was originally placed at Leeds Town Hall. Near Hyde Park corner is a statue of Sir Robert Peel by William Behnes and at the opposite corner where Moorland Road meets Clarendon road is a statue of the Duke of Wellington by Carlo Marochetti. The statue on Monument Moor, on the opposite side of the A660 Woodhouse Lane to the main body of the Moor, is of Henry Rowland Marsden, a Liberal Mayor of Leeds for 1875-6. These statues are regularly the subject of pranks, and can often be seen with paint on them or traffic cones on their heads.

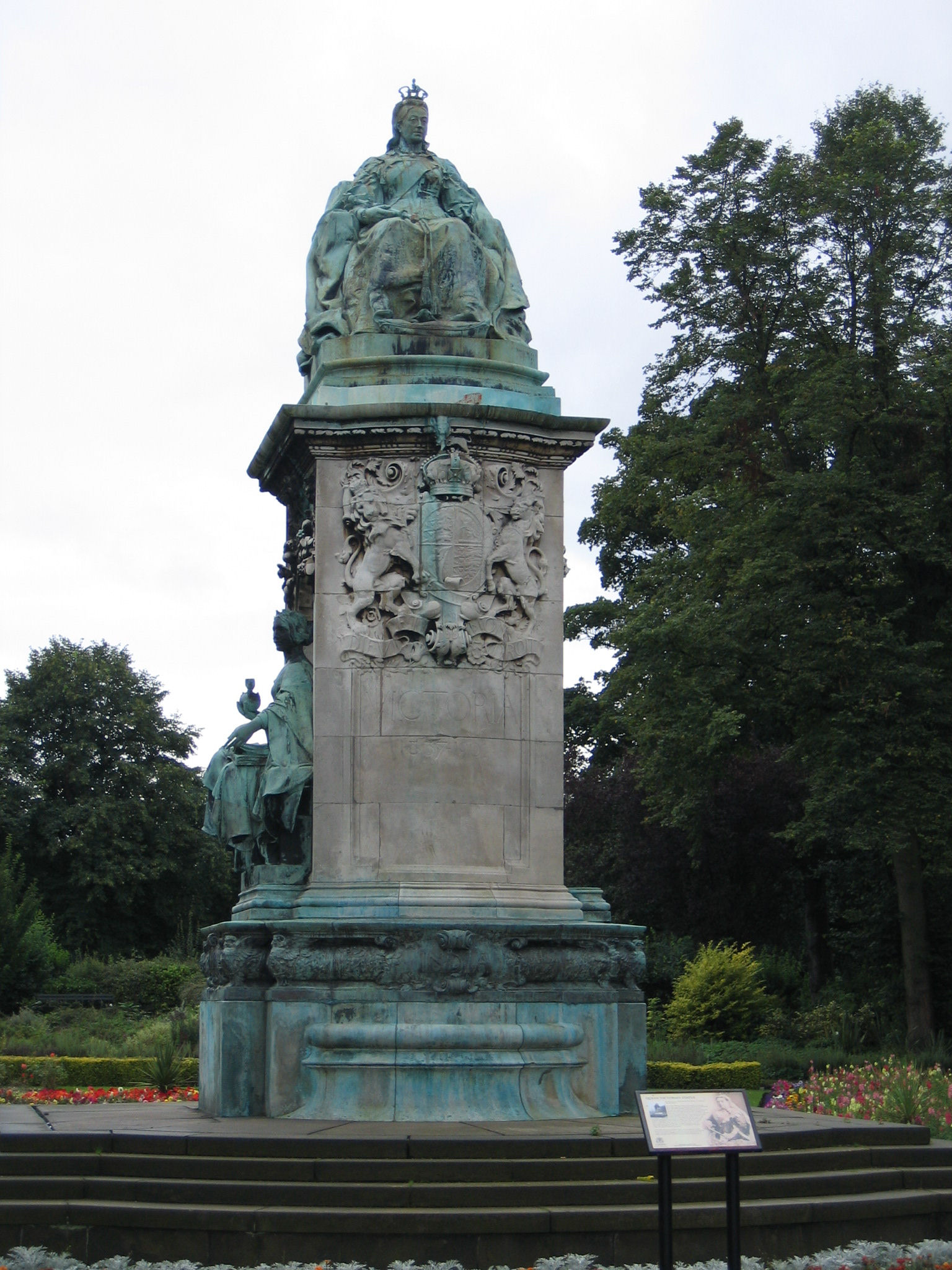
Queen Victoria

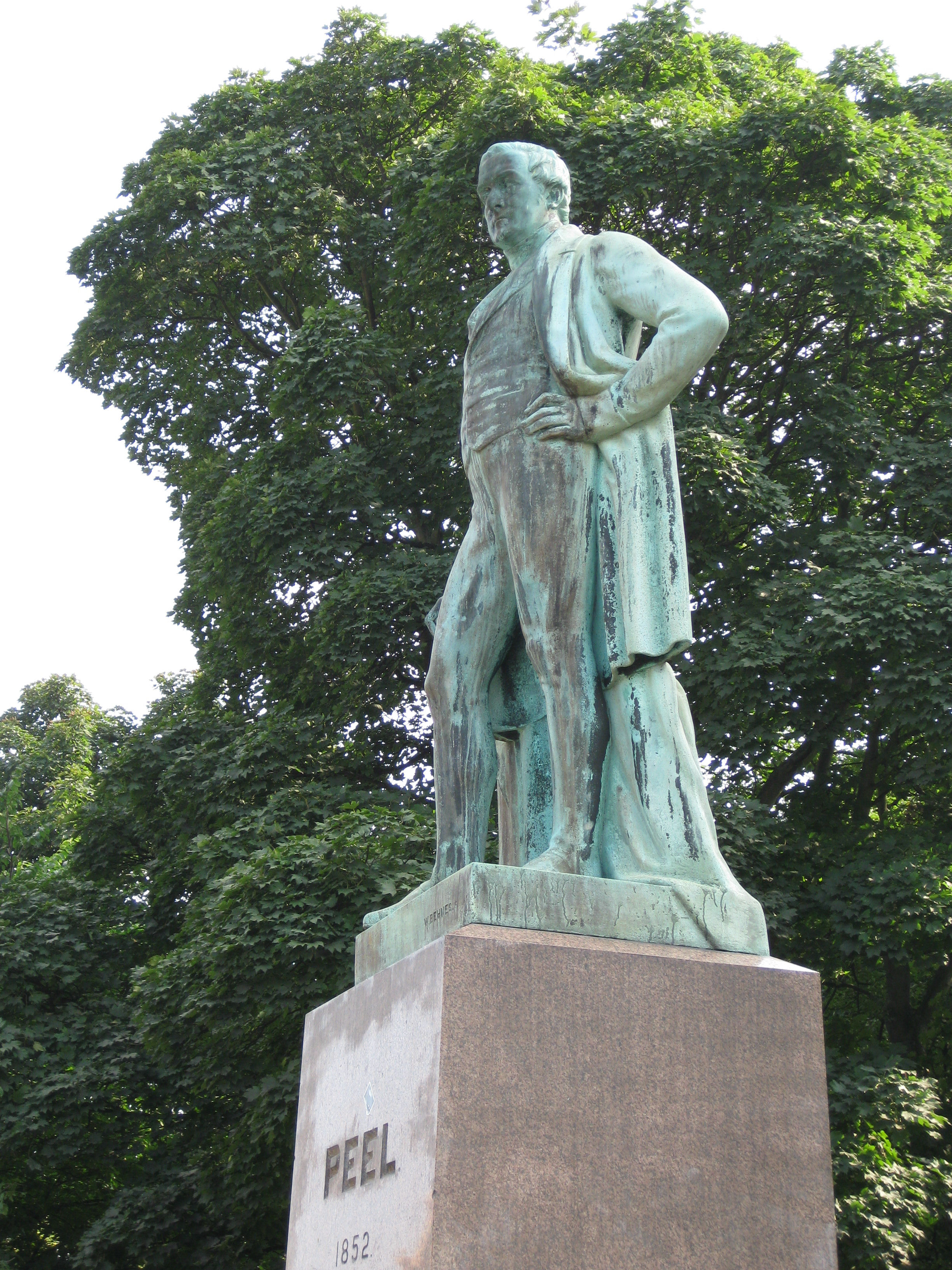
Robert Peel

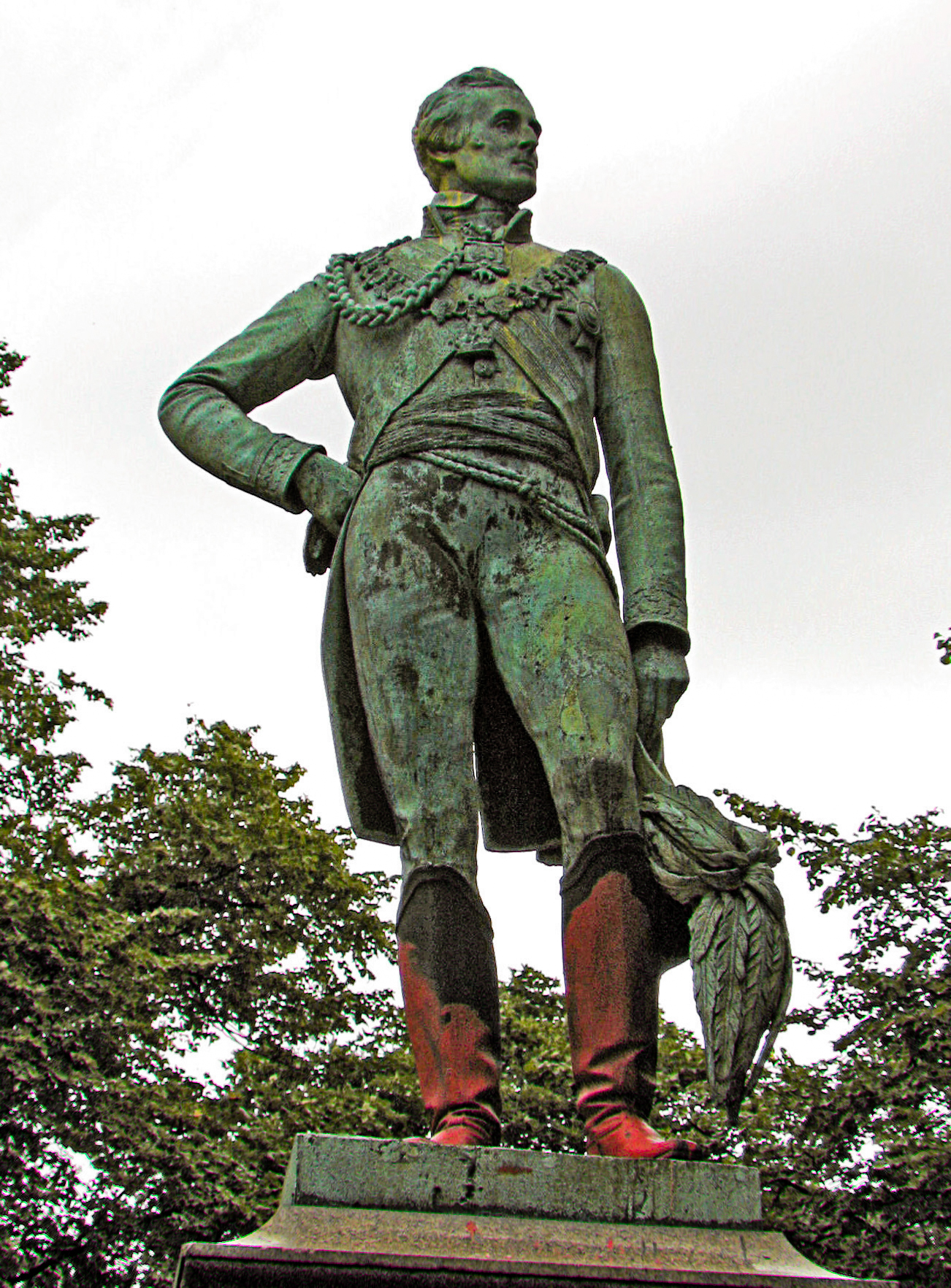
Duke of Wellington

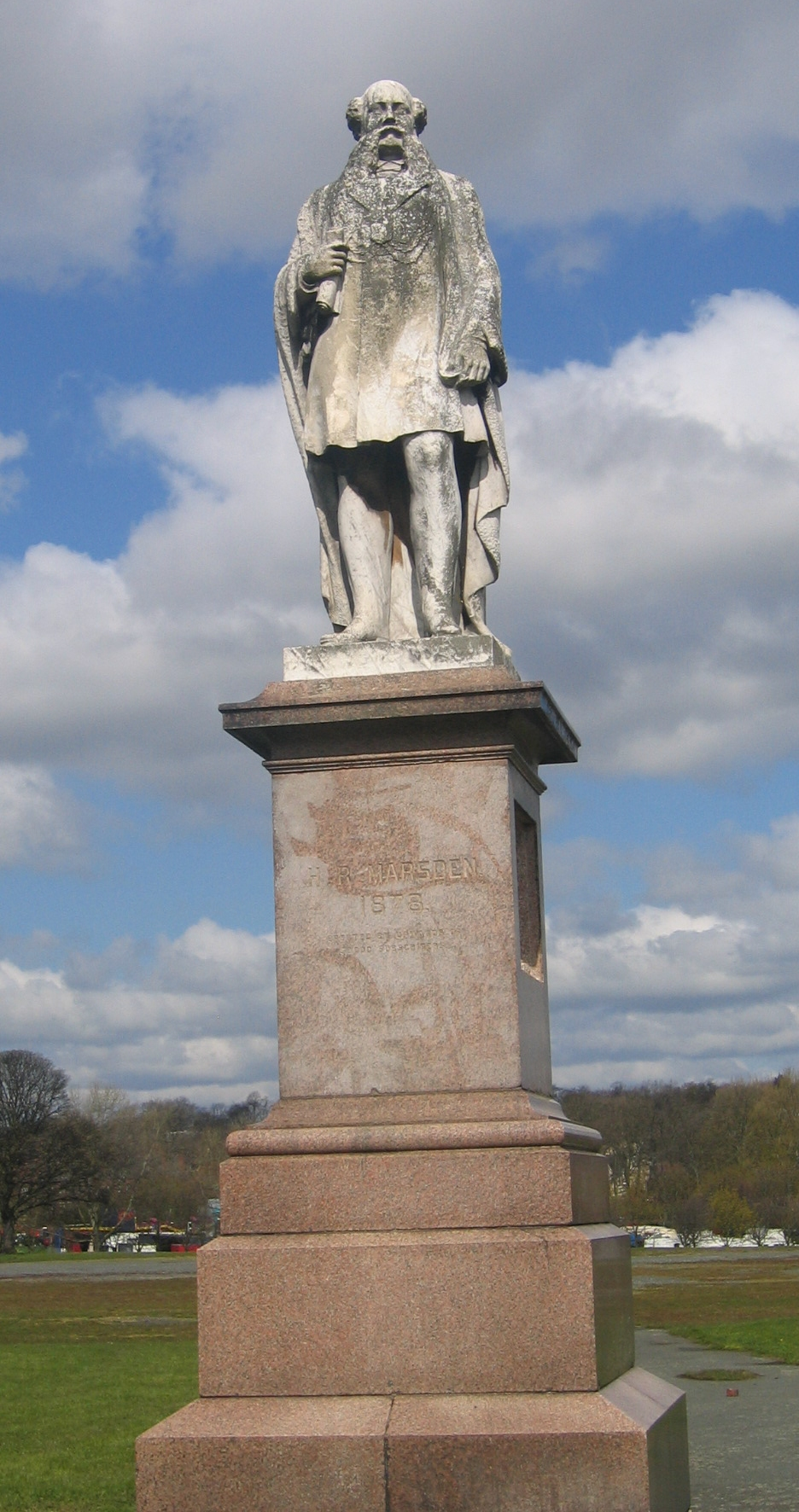
Henry Rowland Marsden

=== Past statues ===
Statues that have now been removed from the park include 'Adam and Eve', who stood from 1896 to 1935 in the 'Adam and Eve Garden' now occupied by the Queen Victoria Monument, and a large stone owl and lion originally put in place in a rockery around 1883.

== Activities ==
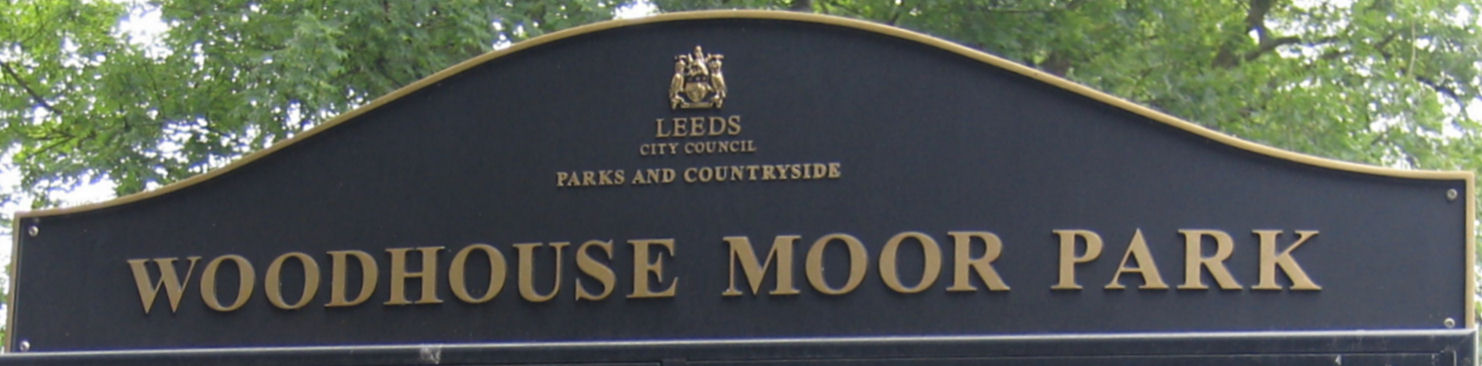

The park has playgrounds, allotments, skateboard and BMX park, formal gardens, and large areas of grassland. It is also the southern end of the Meanwood Valley Trail, a footpath through woods and parks to Golden Acre Park. Unity Day is held in the park on a Saturday in July or August to help unite the community following riots in the local area in 1995. The actual date is not made public until two or three weeks beforehand.

The park is also home to Woodhouse Moor parkrun, one of the many free, weekly 5k runs held in both the UK and internationally. It is held every Saturday at 9.00am (GMT).

=== Protest ===
On 21 June 2020, the Black Lives Matter peaceful protest was held in the park, calling for an end to systemic racism, both in the city and beyond.

== Gallery ==
Images of Woodhouse Moor

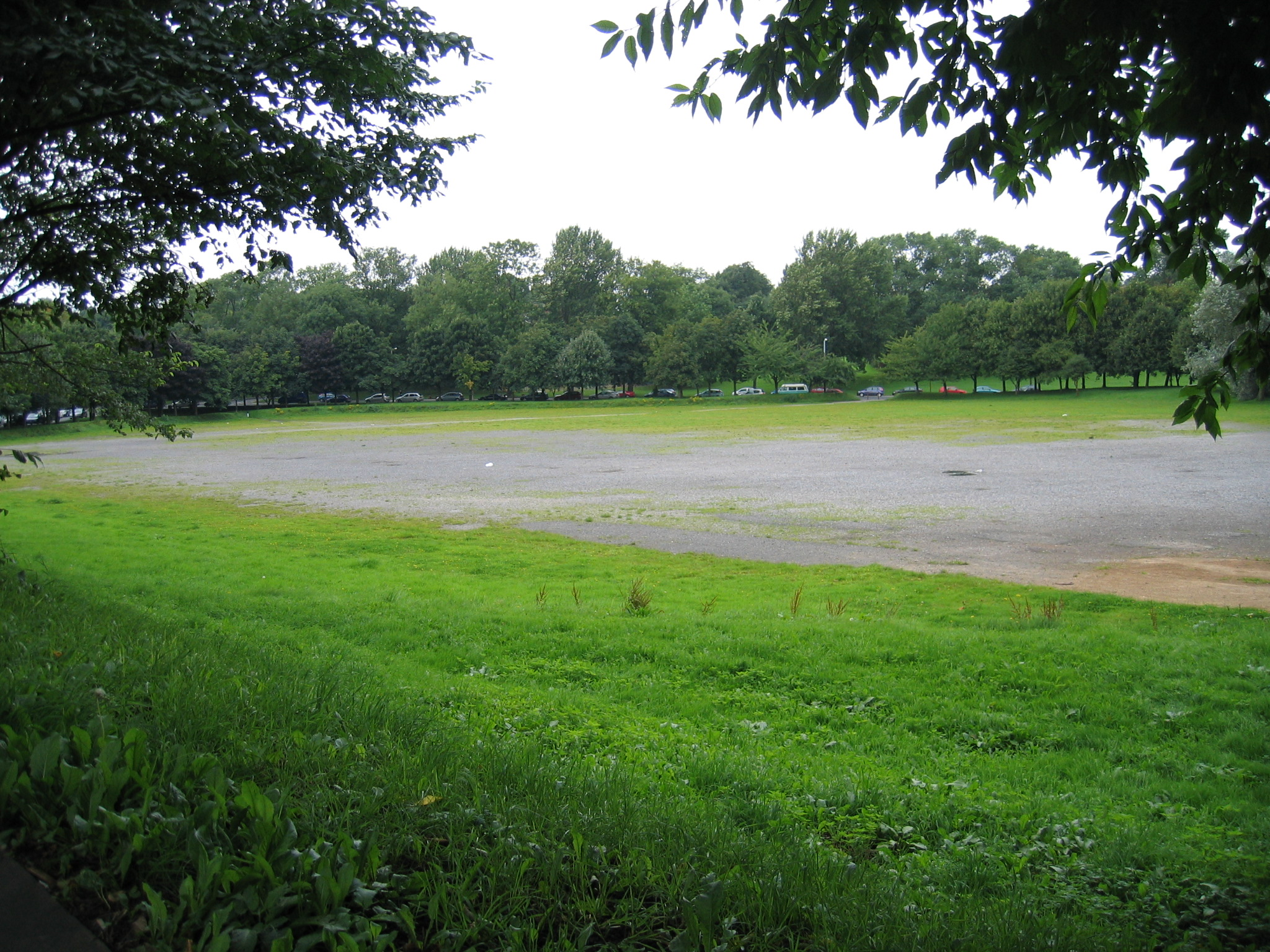
Lower Moor from Woodhouse Lane. A site for fairs etc.

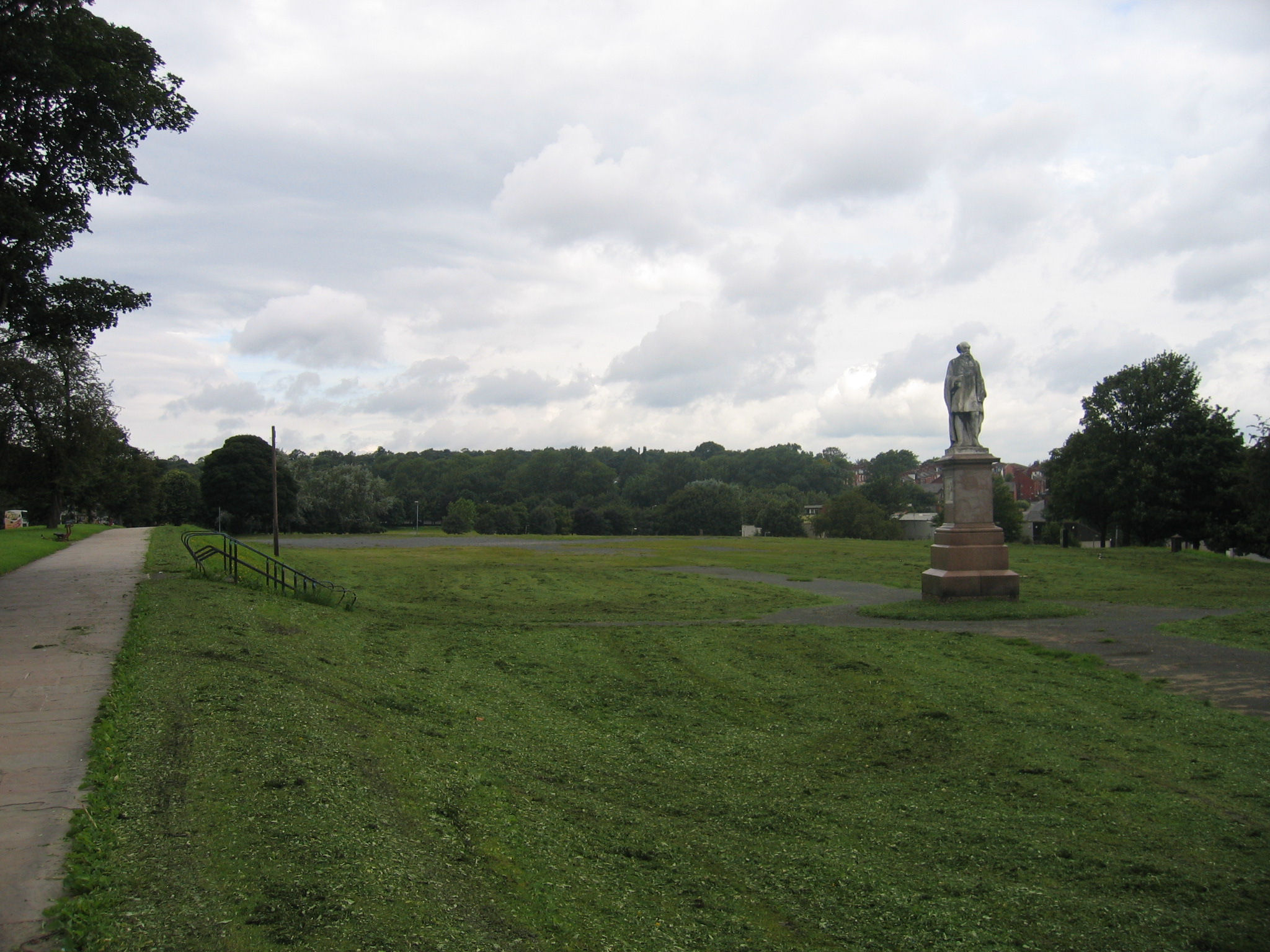
Upper Moor from the South end.

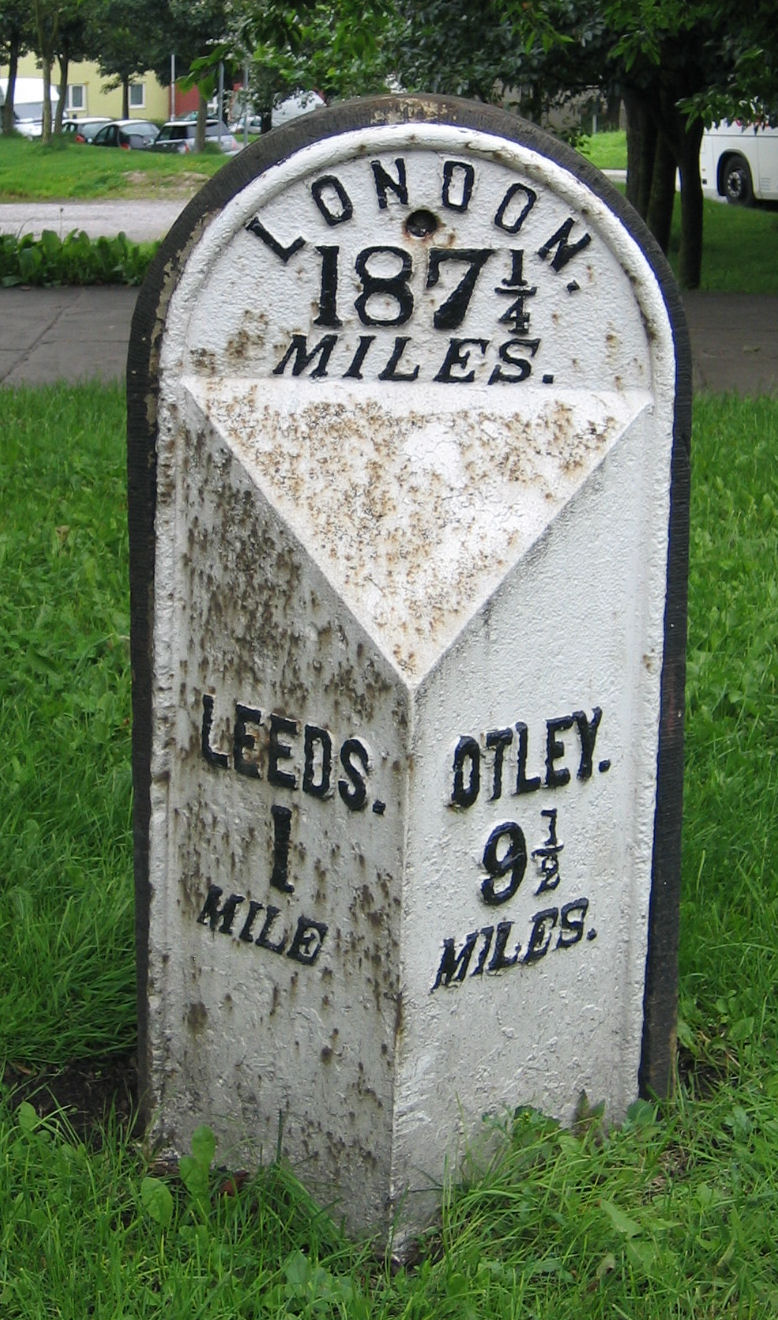
Milepost on East of Woodhouse Lane

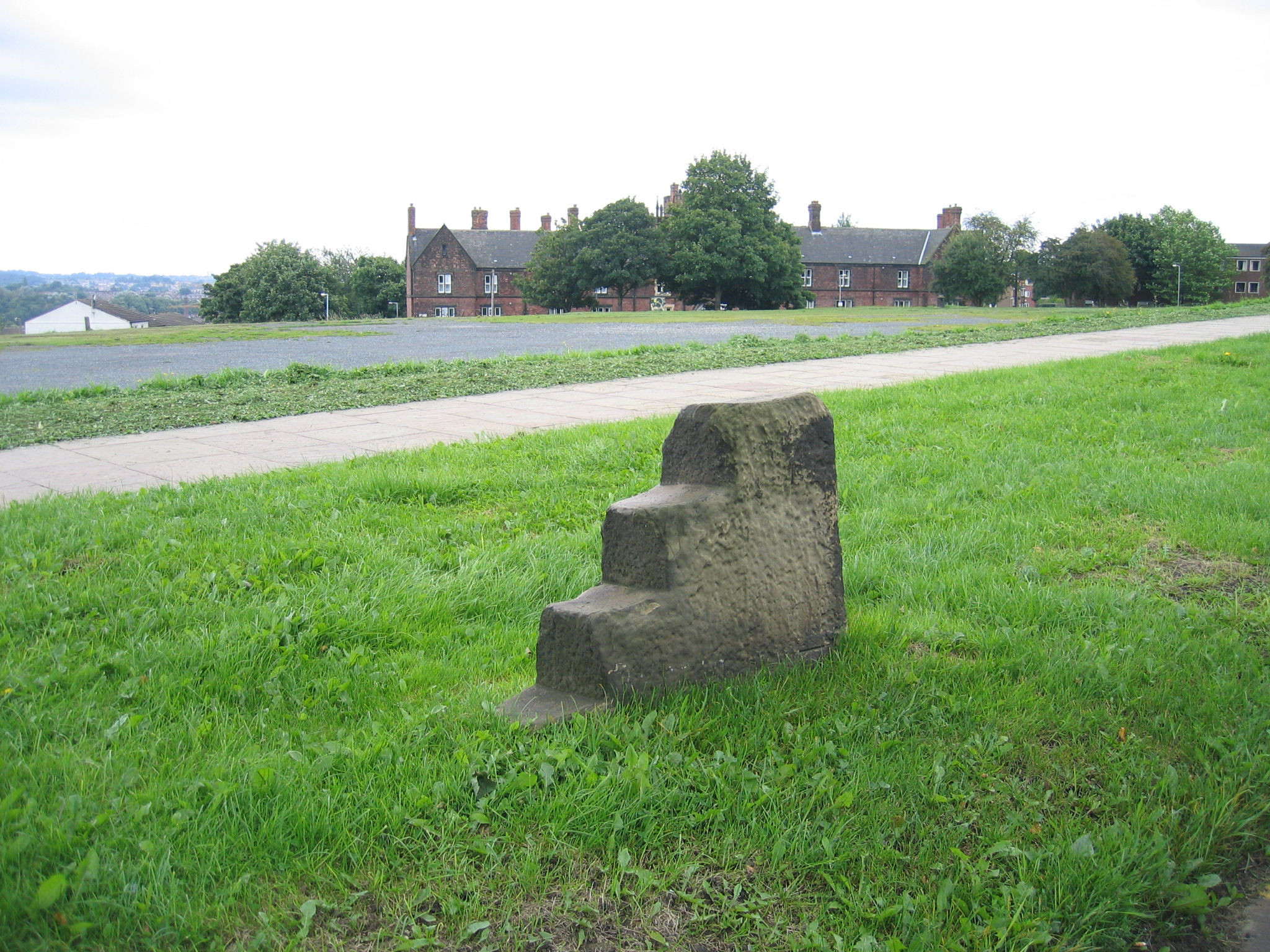
Horse or carriage mounting steps by the Upper Moor

== See also ==
- Listed buildings in Leeds (Hyde Park and Woodhouse)
