= Mickletown =

Suburb of Methley, West Yorkshire, England

Coordinates: 53°44′21″N 1°23′41″W

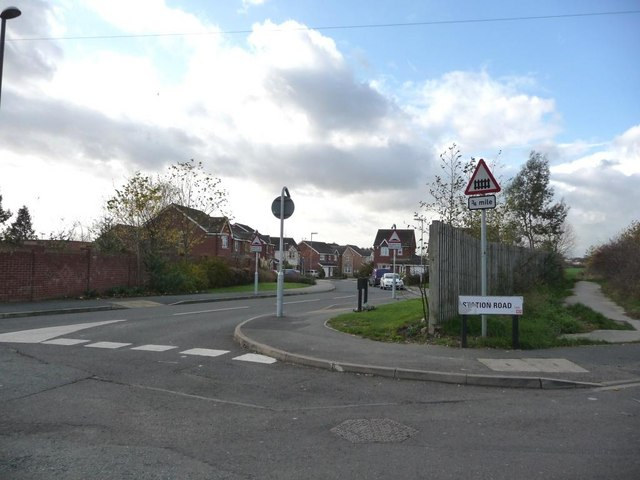
Housing estate in Mickletown

Mickletown is a district within the village of Methley, north of Castleford, and south of Leeds, West Yorkshire, England. The Leeds Country Way and the Trans Pennine Trail both pass Mickletown.

The 2021 United Kingdom census, recorded Mickletown as having a population of 3,358.
