= Wike, West Yorkshire =

Hamlet in West Yorkshire, England

Coordinates: 53.8722°N 1.4889°W

Wike
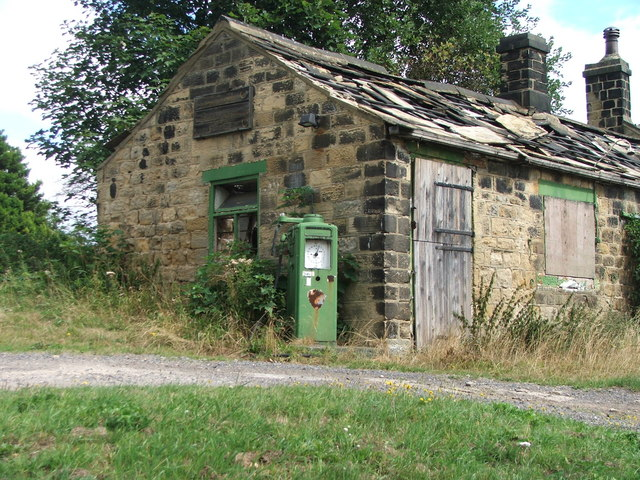

- Location within West Yorkshire
- Civil parish: Harewood
- Metropolitan borough: Leeds
- Metropolitan county: West Yorkshire
- Region: Yorkshire and the Humber
- Country: England
- Sovereign state: United Kingdom
- Police: West Yorkshire
- Fire: West Yorkshire
- Ambulance: Yorkshire

Wike is a hamlet and (as Wyke) a former civil parish, now in the parish of Harewood, north of Leeds, in the Leeds district, in the county of West Yorkshire, England. It is north of Shadwell and Roundhay, west of Scarcroft and south of East Keswick. Many residents use facilities in Leeds as well as in the nearby town of Wetherby. In 1931 the parish had a population of 88.

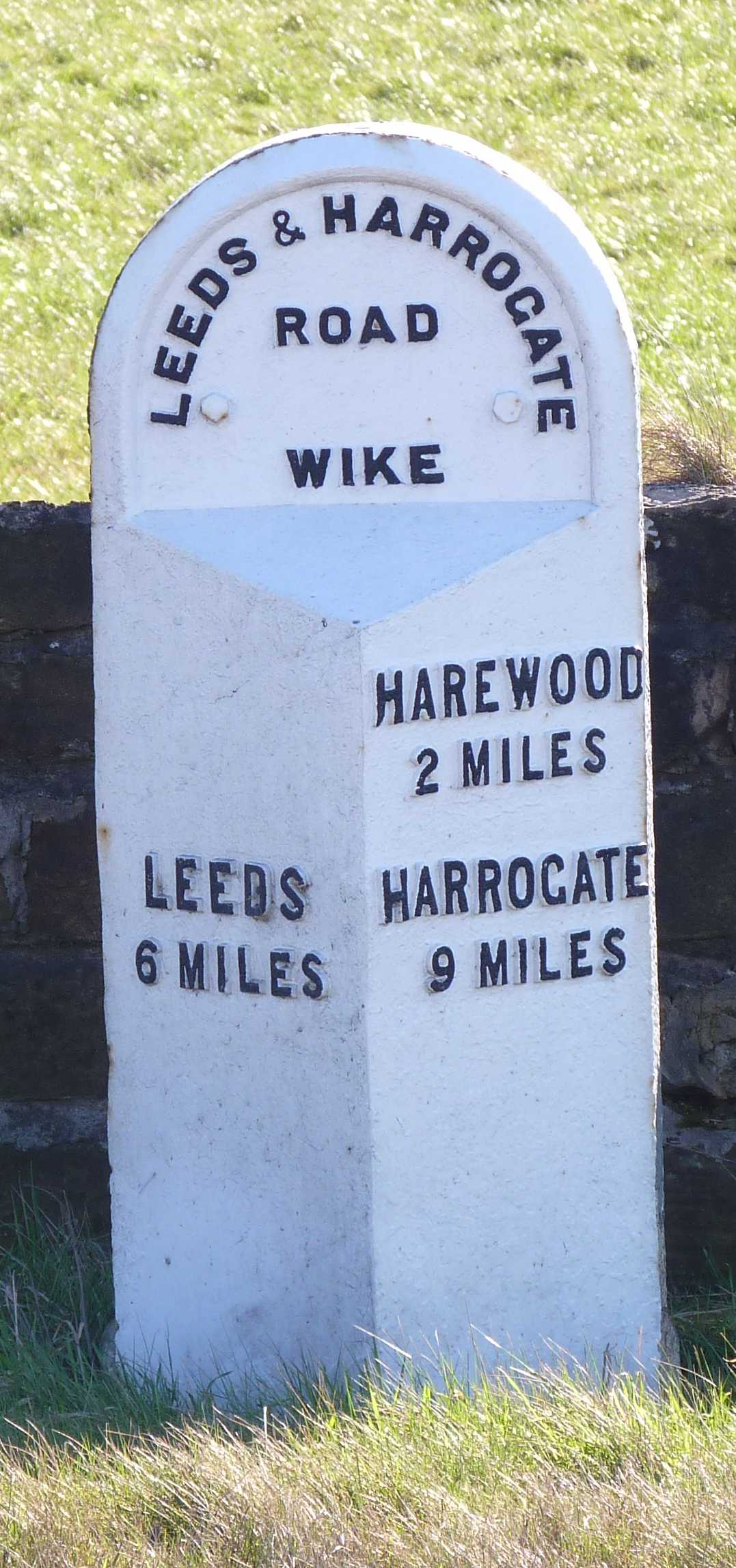
Wike milestone

Wike is one of the few villages in Leeds not to be served by a public bus service: the last service 923, operated by Utopia, was rerouted in early 2003.

Wike is in the Harewood ward of the Leeds Metropolitan Council and is home to a local Scout and Guide 'back-to-basics' campsite operated by North Leeds District Scout Council, as well as several golf courses including Leeds Golf Centre, which is home to Wike Ridge Golf Course, an 18-hole USGA-standard course, The Oaks, a par 3 course and a footgolf pitch. Also provided is a driving range with Toptracer technology. The golf course has a David Leadbetter teaching academy for all abilities.

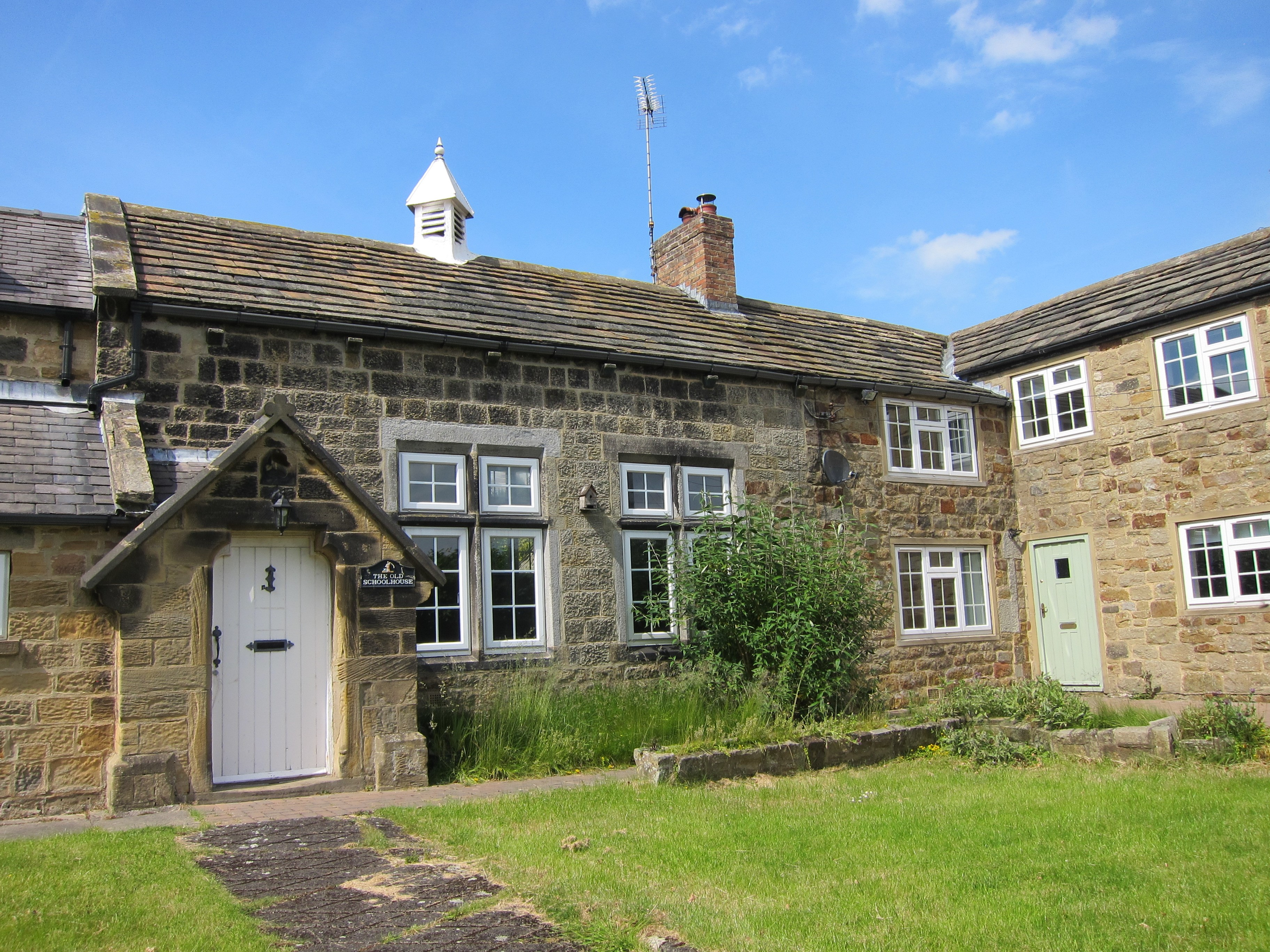
The Old Schoolhouse

A notable building which dates from 1726 has a nameplate "The Old Schoolhouse" on School Lane. Funded by Lady Elizabeth Hastings, it served as a school from Monday to Friday and a church on Sunday, and could be used for meetings until at least 1991. On Fridays the children would put their books away in cupboards, and arrange the desks to make pews for the church, rearranging on Monday. There is also the School Cottage, a one-bedroom bungalow for the teacher. The Schoolhouse has been extended to make a large detached house.

Wike Manor is a grade II listed building built in the mid-eighteenth century, and there is a guide post to the east of Island Cottage in Backstone Gill Lane which is also grade II listed.

== History ==
Wike was formerly a township in Harewood and Bardsey parishes, from 1866 Wyke was a civil parish in its own right until it was abolished on 1 April 1937 and merged with Harewood.
