= Henry Rowland Marsden =

Inventor, philanthropist, and mayor of Leeds, England

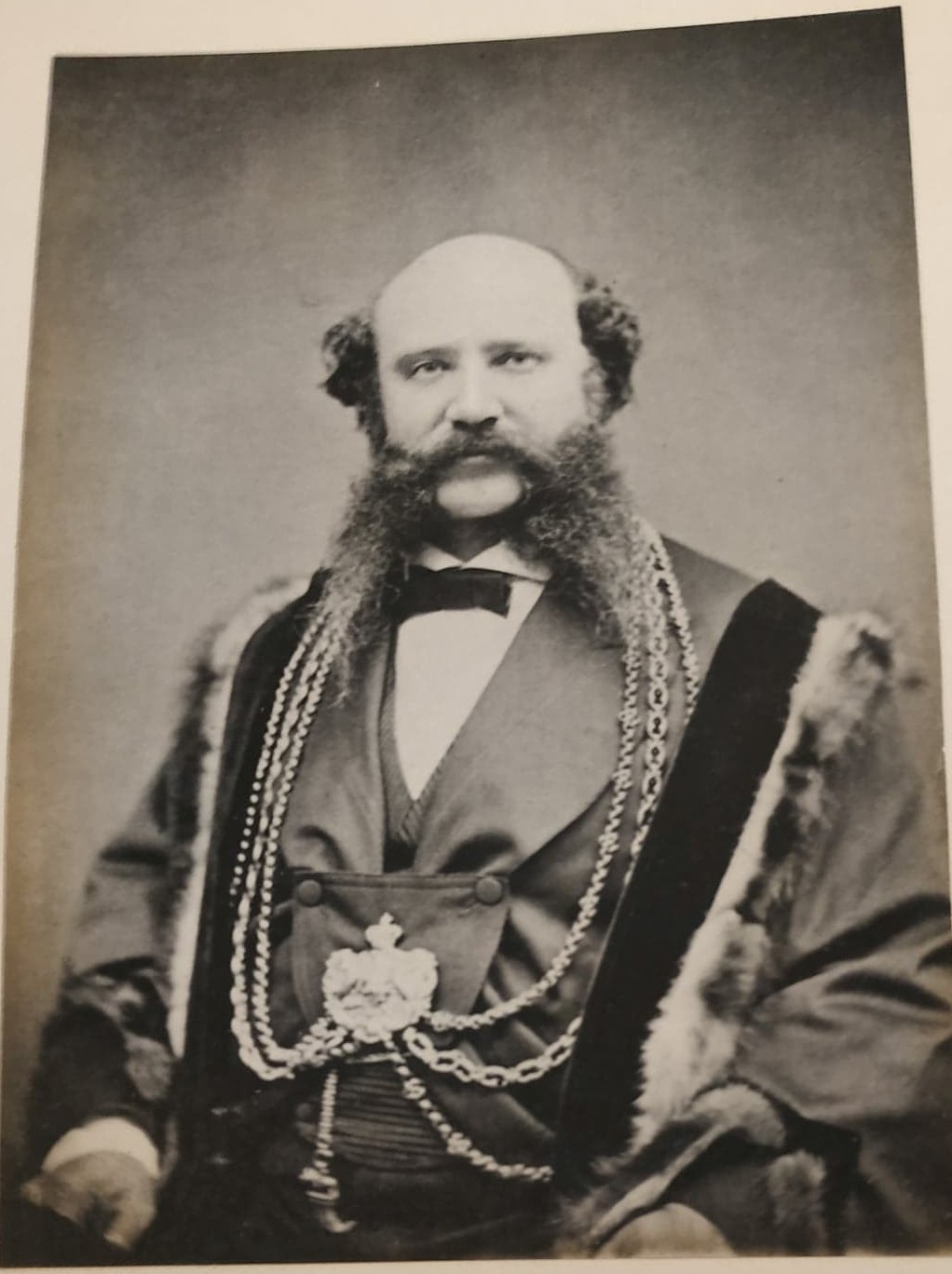
- Mayoral photograph
- Born: 20 July 1823; Holbeck, Leeds, England
- Died: 19 January 1876 (aged 52)
- Resting place: Holbeck Cemetery
- Occupations: Inventor, Mayor of Leeds
- Term: 1873–1875
- Predecessor: Henry Oxley
- Successor: Samuel Croft
- Political party: Liberal Party
- Spouse: Sarah Marsden (nee Hawling)
- Children: Two daughters and two sons

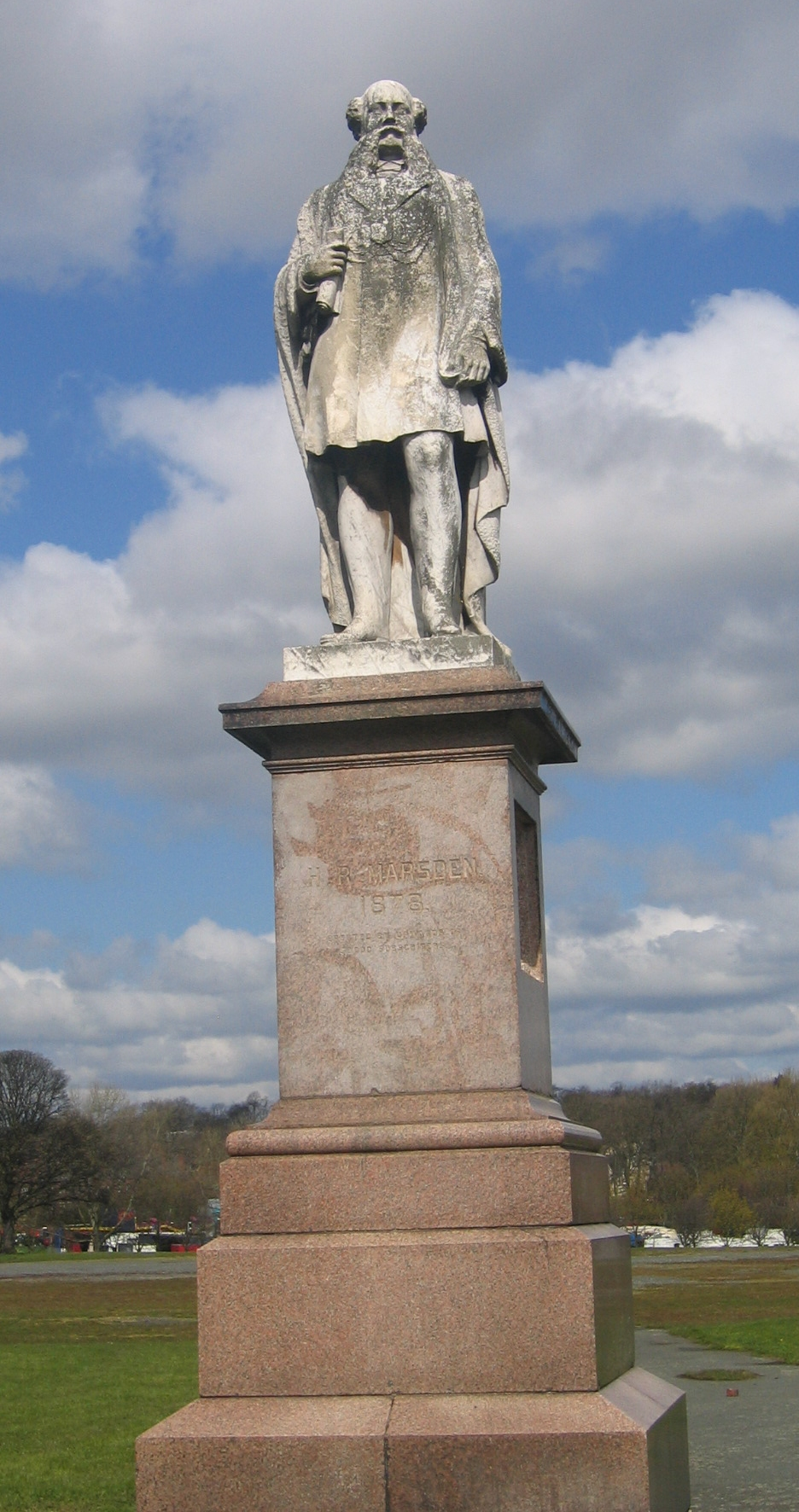
H. R. Marsden statue in Woodhouse Moor, Leeds

Henry Rowland Marsden (20 July 1823 – 19 January 1876) was a philanthropist and (Liberal) Mayor of Leeds for 1873 to 1875, said to be the most popular Victorian mayor of Leeds.

== Early life ==
Henry Marsden was born in Holbeck, Leeds on 20 July 1823 to poor parents, headed by an ex-military father. Having survived a potential drowning aged 6, he started work aged 7 making "yells" for just one shilling and sixpence. It is estimated that, aside from his periods crossing the Atlantic, Marsden was never out of work again, gaining new employment always on the same day he lost it, including several apprenticeships in engineering and a position teaching at the Sweet Street Wesleyan Methodist Sunday School, which he had once attended. Aged 15 Marsden took up one of these apprenticeships and began his lifetime of inventing, culminating with his first original design, a sliver roving machine for the use of flax spinners. By the end of his apprenticeship he had married Sarah Hawling, born on 10 December 1826 to a local butcher.

== America ==
By April 1848 English trade was sufficiently poor that the new Marsden family emigrated to the United States, settling in New York for over a year. Here he began to build up his long list of engineering patents that would become the basis of his wealth, including but not limited to patents for a “cut-off” for steam engines, several sugar mill "improvements", one of the best steam pumps in use for the rest of his life and "improvements" in lathes and planning machines. The family then moved to Newhaven, Connecticut in 1850, where Marsden's inventions and improvements continued to be conceived and produced, and it was here that he began to truly make a name for himself as a great engineer on the highway to fortune. In 1855, after a brief return to Leeds in the previous year, Marsden had made that which would make him world-famous amongst engineers; the Stone Crusher, which made profits far greater than Marsden or any of his colleagues could predict as it quickly sold across the globe. Despite his successes, Marsden's time in America was not without setbacks, and in 1858 a fire broke out in his store, above which the family lived, destroying effectively all their belongings and stock. Marsden and a Mr William Hubbell saved Marsden's wife, two daughters and two other children of the family, with Marsden himself very nearly dying from the fumes and sustaining cuts from glass from a window broken by his head, then pushed through with his shoulder to save his four-year-old son.

== Return to England ==
In spite of the fire, Marsden was able to return a wealthy man to Leeds in 1862, setting up a factory for patent stone-crushing machinery to take advantage of the demand at that time for road building. He received 45 first class gold and silver medals and honours for his inventions, which continued to provide him with the wealth to enable him to donate both time and money to public life.

His interest in local affairs led him to the Liberal Party and he was elected as local councillor for Holbeck in 1866 with the biggest majority then recorded, becoming an alderman in 1872 and mayor in 1873. He also served as chief magistrate for six years.

It was said that "from the beginning he conducted the business of the town and of the Council without consideration of sect, party or denomination, acting with strict impartiality and goodwill to all", with "prejudice, passion, and personal preference has been concealed by a manly English patriotism”. Additionally, he is recorded to have donated £2000 (equivalent to £247,111 in 2024) per year to good causes, and each "great local movement during 1873-4 and 1874-5 [was] either initiated or spurred on by his judgement, generosity, and energy".

== Death and legacy ==
He died suddenly on 19 January 1876, leaving a widow, Sarah, two daughters and a son. He is buried in Holbeck Cemetery in Beeston where his grave is marked by a Grade II-listed memorial.

In terms of art, two years before Marsden's death, a one Mr. Linsley wrote a eulogium for the mayor. Additionally, following his death, a public subscription raised £1000 (equivalent to £123,556 in 2024) to erect a statue of him on the junction of Merrion Street and Woodhouse Lane, (which has now been moved to Woodhouse Moor) by Leeds-based sculptor John Throp (1819–1889).
