= List of cotton mills in Yorkshire =

The textile industry of Yorkshire after 1835 was based principally on wool, but many of the early cotton mills were based in the county and the assets and spinning machines often switched from cotton to wool. Towns like Keighley and Todmorden owe their expansion to cotton.

== Bradford ==
Name	Architect	Location	Built	Demolished	Served (Years)
Castlefield Mills		Bingley , SE 099 403 53°51′31″N 1°51′05″W			
Providence Mill		Bingley , SE 105 394 53°51′02″N 1°50′32″W			
Elmtree Mill		Bingley , SE 111 391 53°50′52″N 1°50′00″W			
Cottingley		SE 127 374 53°49′57″N 1°48′32″W			
Hewenden Mill		SE 077360 53°49′12″N 1°53′06″W			
Ellar Carr Mill		Cullingworth, SE 077360 53°49′12″N 1°53′06″W			

== Huddersfield ==
Name	Architect	Location	Built	Demolished	Served (Years)
The Factory		Marsden , SE 053 117 53°36′06″N 1°55′18″W			
Upper End Mill		Marsden , SE 053 117 53°36′06″N 1°55′18″W			
New Mill		Marsden , SE 052 117 53°36′06″N 1°55′24″W			
Frank's Mill		Marsden , SE 052 117 53°36′06″N 1°55′24″W			
Smithy Holme Mill		Marsden, SE 052 120 53°36′16″N 1°55′24″W			
Lingards Wood Bottom Mill		Marsden, SE 054 122 53°36′22″N 1°55′13″W			

== Leeds ==
Name	Architect	Location	Built	Demolished	Served (Years)
Scotland Mills		Leeds , SE 278 381 53°50′18″N 1°34′46″W			
Waterloo Mill		Leeds , SE 314 313 53°46′37″N 1°31′32″W			
Bank Low Mill		Leeds , SE 312 329 53°47′29″N 1°31′42″W			
Mabgate or Sheepscar		Leeds , SE 305 348 53°48′30″N 1°32′20″W			
Nether Mills		Leeds , SE 304348 53°48′31″N 1°32′25″W			

== Todmorden ==
Name	Architect	Location	Built	Demolished	Served (Years)
Pudsey Mill		SD 908 264 53°44′01″N 2°08′29″W			
Frieldhurst Mill		SD 912 261 53°43′52″N 2°08′07″W			
Barewise Mill		SD 912 258 53°43′42″N 2°08′07″W			
Kitson Wood Mill		SD 920 257 53°43′39″N 2°07′24″W			
Ewood Mill		SD 930 248 53°43′10″N 2°06′29″W			
Holme Mill		SD 929 250 53°43′16″N 2°06′34″W			

== Lonsdale ==
Name	Architect	Location	Built	Demolished	Served (Years)
Millthorpe Mill		SD 661 913 54°18′58″N 2°31′23″W			
Birks Mill		SD 658 914 54°19′01″N 2°31′40″W			
Burton-in-Lonsdale CottonMill		SD 649 718 54°08′27″N 2°32′21″W			
Westhouse Mill		SD 671 737 54°09′28″N 2°30′21″W			
Ingleton Mill		SD 694 733 54°09′16″N 2°28′14″W			
Clapham Mill		SD 727 688 54°06′51″N 2°25′11″W			
Clapham Wood Mill		SD 727 688 54°06′51″N 2°25′11″W			
Austwick Cotton Mill		SD 779 694 54°07′11″N 2°20′24″W			
Bentham Cotton Mill		SD 649 693 54°07′06″N 2°32′20″W			

== Airedale ==
Name	Architect	Location	Built	Demolished	Served (Years)
Malham Mill		SD 898 633 54°03′55″N 2°09′28″W			
Scalegill Mill		SD 898 617 54°03′04″N 2°09′28″W			
Airton Mill		SD 904 593 54°01′46″N 2°08′55″W			
Bell Busk Mill		SD 905 563 54°00′09″N 2°08′49″W			
High Mill		Gargrave , SD 925 538 53°58′48″N 2°06′59″W			
Low Mill		Gargrave , SD 935 539 53°58′52″N 2°06′04″W			

== Swaledale ==
Name	Architect	Location	Built	Demolished	Served (Years)
Richmond Cotton Mill		NZ 170 000 54°23′42″N 1°44′25″W			

== Ribblesdale ==
Name	Architect	Location	Built	Demolished	Served (Years)
Stainforth Mill		SD 817 673 54°06′04″N 2°16′54″W			
Landcliffe Mill		SD 816 650 54°04′49″N 2°17′00″W			
Settle Bridge Mill		SD 817 642 54°04′24″N 2°16′54″W			
Higher Mill		Settle , SD 814 637 54°04′07″N 2°17′10″W			
Runley Bridge Mill		Settle , SD 811 623 54°03′22″N 2°17′27″W			
Lower Mill		Long Preston , SD 832 575 54°00′47″N 2°15′30″W			
Fleet's Mill		Long Preston , SD 832 575 54°00′47″N 2°15′30″W			
Giggleswick Mill		Giggleswick , SD 812 640 53°24′24″N 2°04′03″W			

== Washburn Valley ==
Name	Architect	Location	Built	Demolished	Served (Years)
Low Mill		West End , SE 152578 53°24′24″N 2°04′03″W			
High Mill		West End , SE134 582 53°24′24″N 2°04′03″W			
Little Mill		West End , SE143582 54°01′10″N 1°47′01″W			
