= A660 road =

Road in West Yorkshire, England

A660

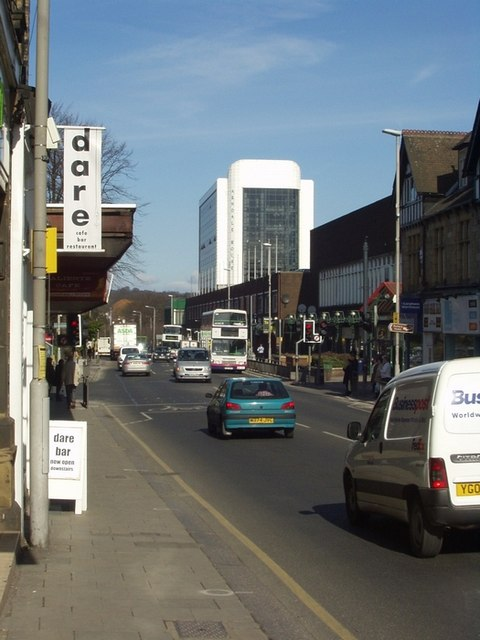
- Otley Road, Headingley, looking NW

Route information
- Length: 10 mi (16 km)

Major junctions
- South-east end: Leeds; 53.8028°N 1.5460°W
- A58(M) (Leeds Inner Ring Road); A6120 road (Leeds Outer Ring Road) A658 A659; A65
- North-west end: Burley-in-Wharfedale; 53.9116°N 1.7369°W

Location
- Country: United Kingdom

Road network
- Roads in the United Kingdom; Motorways; A and B road zones

The A660 is a major road in the Leeds and Bradford districts of West Yorkshire, England that runs from Leeds city centre to Burley-in-Wharfedale where it meets the A65. (The A65 also starts in Leeds and runs parallel to, and south of, the A660. It continues to Ilkley, Skipton, Settle and Kendal as a main trans-Pennine route.) The A660 is approximately 10 miles (16 km) long, and crosses the watershed from Airedale to lower Wharfedale. For most of its length the road is in the metropolitan district of the City of Leeds; the last 0.4 miles (0.6 km) is in City of Bradford district.

== Route ==
=== Leeds city centre to Leeds Ring Road ===
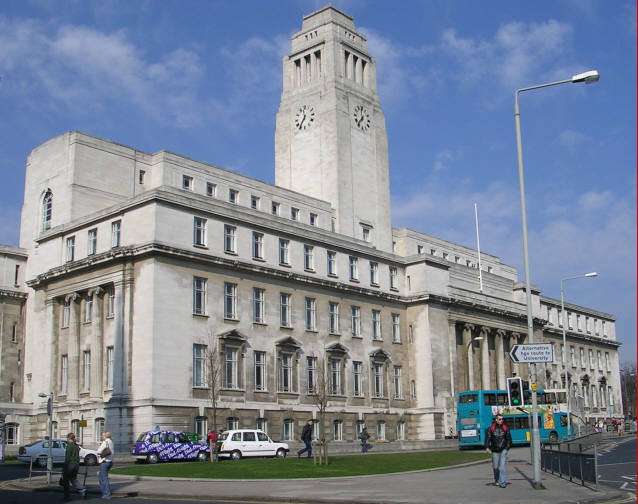
University of Leeds on Woodhouse Lane

The A660 starts in Leeds city centre, officially at the junction of Woodhouse Lane and Claypit Lane. The northbound carriageway passes Leeds Metropolitan University's "civic quarter" campus, crosses the A58(M) (Leeds Inner Ring Road), which is in a cutting, and passes the University of Leeds with its landmark tower. The southbound carriageway is separated, at one stage by several terraced streets. The carriageways combine before crossing Woodhouse Moor to Hyde Park. The road passes the buildings of Leeds Girls' High School and climbs to Headingley, passing St Michael's Church and many shops and bars including the Arndale Centre. Shortly after the church, a plaque shows the site of the original oak tree which gave its name to the wapentake of Skyrack ("Shire oak"): this is reflected in two pub names and nearby Shire Oak Road. The road continues through Far Headingley and West Park.

This stretch of the A660 was the route of the first tram service in Leeds (to Far Headingley) and is still a major bus corridor, with several peak hour bus lanes. It suffers from high congestion, and there were historic plans to create a Headingley bypass. Line 2 of the proposed Leeds Supertram was to be on this road, as is the "North Route" proposed in 2009 for New Generation Transport trolleybus service.

Many students live near the road, and its many licensed premises host the Otley Run pub crawl.

The road has several names in this section: Woodhouse Lane from Claypit Lane to Hyde Park (but Blenheim Walk for the separated southbound carriageway), Headingley Lane between Hyde Park and St Michael's church, Headingley, and Otley Road beyond this point.

=== Leeds Ring Road to A65 ===
The A660 crosses the A6120 (Leeds Ring Road – officially Leeds Outer Ring Road) at Lawnswood, and then passes the western part of Adel. At Golden Acre Park the road crosses the Leeds Country Way footpath, which uses the underpass taking pedestrians from the car park to the park. The road passes east of the main part of Bramhope village, and the next major intersection is the A658 Bradford to Harrogate road: Pool Bank is a steep hill leading north-east from this junction down to Pool-in-Wharfedale. The road skirts the northern slopes of The Chevin before bypassing Otley to the south along the line of the former Otley and Ilkley Joint Railway (opened 1865, closed 1967). At the end of the Otley bypass the road crosses the A6038 (Otley to Bradford), and then follows the River Wharfe before joining the A65 at the roundabout at the start of the Burley-in-Wharfedale bypass.

About 0.4 miles (0.6 km) before its end, the road crosses into City of Bradford metropolitan district, having been in the City of Leeds district for the rest of its length. The road is only separated from the county of North Yorkshire by a few yards and the width of the river Wharfe, which here forms the county boundary.

The road is known as Otley Road until Golden Acre Park, then Leeds Road until the start of the Otley bypass.

== History ==
In the early 18th century the main road from Leeds to Otley ran via Burley and Cookridge and over the top of The Chevin, while the road from Leeds to Headingley was only a country lane. The Leeds-Otley Turnpike Trust was established in 1755, and improved the road from Leeds to Headingley and thence to Cookridge to join the existing road. There were toll bars in Woodhouse Lane and at Otley, and in 1775 a third toll house was built in Headingley village. In 1836 the trustees commissioned George Hayward to design a new route to bypass the steep slopes of The Chevin. The necessary Act of Parliament was passed in 1837, and the new stretch of road was opened in 1842, following today's route along the north side of the hill. Tolls on the road were abolished in January 1867, following the Leeds Improvement Act 1866.

The first suburban horse-drawn bus service in Leeds was that to Far Headingley along this road, started in 1838, providing five services daily. The first horse-drawn tram in Leeds followed, in 1871. Fittingly, the number 1 bus service operated by First Leeds still runs on a route which includes the A660 from the city centre past Headingley and Lawnswood before turning off towards Holt Park.

== Gallery of images along the A660 road ==
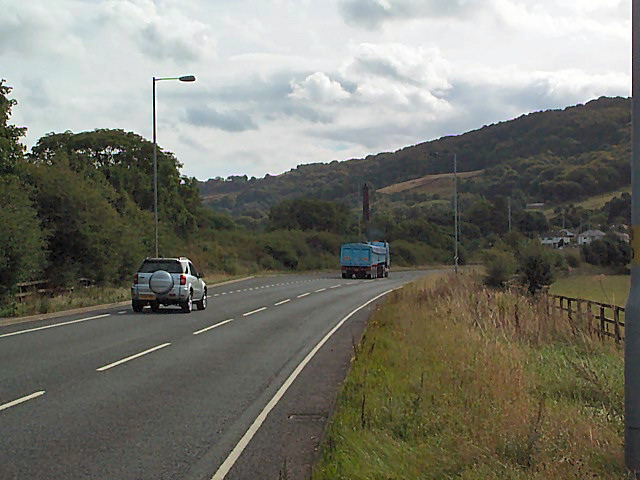
A660 near Otley, looking SE
