= Courson (disambiguation) =

Courson may refer to:

== People ==
- Charles de Courson (born 1952), French politician
- Charles de Courbon de Blénac (1622–1696), French military officer, nobleman and colonial administrator
- François Courson de la Villehelio (1791–1830), French military officer
- Hughes de Courson, French musician and arranger
- John Courson (born 1944), American politician
- Olivier Courson (born 1965), French film producer
- Pamela Courson (1946–1974), American partner of Jim Morrison
- Robert of Courson (c. 1160/1170–1219), English cardinal
- Steve Courson (1955–2005), American football player

== Places ==
- Courson, French commune
- Courson-les-Carrières, French commune
- Courson-Monteloup, French commune
- Courson Island, Pennsylvania, US
- Notre-Dame-de-Courson, French commune

== See also ==
- Corson (surname)
