= Listed buildings in Leeds (Adel and Wharfedale Ward) =

Adel and Wharfedale is a ward in the metropolitan borough of the City of Leeds, West Yorkshire, England. It contains 40 listed buildings that are recorded in the National Heritage List for England. Of these, one is listed at Grade I, the highest of the three grades, and the others are at Grade II, the lowest grade. The ward is to the north of the centre of Leeds, and contains the areas of Adel and Cookridge, and countryside to the north. The ward contains St John's Church, which is listed at Grade I, and associated buildings and monuments in the churchyard are listed. Also in the ward is Lawnswood Cemetery, which contains listed buildings and memorials, including a war memorial. In the ward is Cookridge Hall, which is listed together with associated structures. The other listed buildings include houses, farmhouses and farm buildings, two milestones, a public house, and a former reform school.

== Key ==
Grade	Criteria
I	Buildings of exceptional interest, sometimes considered to be internationally important
II	Buildings of national importance and special interest

== Buildings ==
Name and location	Photograph	Date	Notes	Grade
St John's Church; 53.85768°N 1.58400°W		1150–60	The church was altered in the 14th and 16th centuries, in 1839 the west gable end was rebuilt and a bellcote added by R. D. Chantrell, and in 1878–79 the church was restored by G. E. Street. The church is built in gritstone with a stone slate roof, and consists of a nave and a lower chancel. There is a corbel-frieze running round the church carved with faces and beasts. On the south is an elaborate gabled portal containing an arched doorway with five orders, all carved with different decoration, and in the gable above are carved panels, with depictions including Christ in Majesty, and the symbols of the Four Evangelists. Some windows are Norman, in the south wall of the chancel is a two-light Decorated window, and the nave contains Perpendicular windows.	I
Aisled barn west of Crag House; 53.86723°N 1.62846°W		Mid 16th century	The barn was originally timber framed, it was encased in stone in the 17th century, and the roof was clad in corrugated asbestos in the 20th century. The barn has quoins, five bays, and aisles, full length on the north side, and with three bays on the south. On the south side is a cart entry with a quoined surround, and in the aisle is a blocked doorway with chamfered quoined jambs.	II
Crag House; 53.86732°N 1.62793°W		17th century	A farmhouse in gritstone with a tile roof, two storeys, four bays, and a ruined two-bay range to the right. The doorway has a chamfered surround and a flattened Tudor arch, the ground floor windows are mullioned with up to six lights, and above is a continuous hood mould, stepped up over the doorway. Mullions have been removed from upper floor windows, and two larger square windows have been inserted. In the ruined range is part of a timber framed wall encased in stone.	II
Main block, High Farm Public House; 53.85525°N 1.60504°W		17th century	A farmhouse that was rebuilt in about 1725, extended in about 1816, and converted into a public house in 1977. It is in gritstone with quoins and a stone slate roof. There are two storeys, three bays, and a two-bay rear wing. The doorway has quoined jambs, a moulded surround, and a decorated lintel. The windows are mullioned, with some mullions removed.	II
Lounge and Food Bar, High Farm Public House; 53.85542°N 1.60515°W	—	17th century (or earlier)	The oldest part is a former barn, an outbuilding was added in the 18th century, and they were incorporated in a public house in 1977. The barn has a timber framed core, it was encased in gritstone in about 1725, it has quoins, and a stone slate roof. There are six bays and a north aisle. It has a doorway with a segmental arch and voussoirs, flanked by pitching holes, and elsewhere are slit vents. The former outbuilding has two storeys and two bays, with doorways converted into windows.	II
Barn, Moseley Farm; 53.86163°N 1.63210°W		Mid 17th century	The barn is in gritstone with quoins, and a stone slate roof with coped gables and moulded kneelers. There are five bays and a south aisle. The openings include a segmental-arched cart entry with a chamfered surround, various doorways, windows and vents.	II
Cart sheds and outbuildings, Moseley Farm; 53.86141°N 1.63218°W		17th century (possible)	The farm buildings were altered later, and are in gritstone with roofs of stone slate and corrugated asbestos. There is a single storey, and two ranges. The east range is a former cart shed with two bays and a vehicle shed. The south range has four bays, originally with an open side, now filled in.	II
Stable, granary range, cottage and archway, Moseley Farm; 53.86151°N 1.63233°W		17th century	A range of farm buildings consisting of stables or byres with a hayloft and granary above converted into a cottage with an added bay, which is linked by an archway to a barn. The buildings are in gritstone with quoins and roofs of stone slate or grey slate. The openings vary, and include doorways, windows and vents. There is an external stone stairway leading up to a doorway with a chamfered surround and an owl hole above.	II
Sundial; 53.85754°N 1.58396°W	—	1682	The sundial is in the churchyard of St John's Church to the south of the church. It is in gritstone, and consists of a monolithic chamfered shaft on a square base and plinth. It has a moulded capital, it is about 1.5 metres (4 ft 11 in) high, and on it is an inscribed plate. As of 2019, only the base remains.	II
Cocker Hill Farmhouse; 53.86718°N 1.59896°W	—	Mid 18th century	The farmhouse is in gritstone, and has a stone slate roof with coped gables. There are two storeys, two bays, and a recessed bay on the left. The doorway has tie-stone jambs, and the windows are 16-pane sashes.	II
Farm building, Cocker Hill Farm; 53.86698°N 1.59879°W	—	Mid 18th century	The outbuilding is in gritstone with quoins and a stone slate roof. There are two storeys and three bays. It contains a ground floor entrance and square windows. In the upper floor is a hay loft entrance with tie-stone jambs, approached by a double flight of external stone steps containing a doorway with a plain lintel.	II
Barn southwest of Crag House; 53.86708°N 1.62826°W		Mid 18th century	The barn is in gritstone with quoins and a corrugated sheet roof. There are three bays, and it contains a cart entry with a segmental arch and quoined jambs, and square openings. At the end are doors with tie-stone jambs and plain lintels. Elsewhere, there is a hay door forming a loft doorway, and square vents.	II
Outbuilding, High Farm Public House; 53.85549°N 1.60455°W		Mid 18th century (possible)	Originally stables and a granary, it was incorporated in a public house in 1977. The building is in gritstone and has a stone slate roof with coped gables and moulded kneelers. There are two storeys and four bays. It contains a wide entrance with tie-stone jambs, square windows, and in the right gable end is a pigeon loft opening with a projecting sill.	II
Mounting block 53.85738°N 1.58533°W		Mid 18th century (probable)	The mounting block is outside the west gate of the churchyard of St John's Church. It is in gritstone and consists of four steps up to a platform, and a stone post.	II
Cookridge Hall, walls, gate piers and gates 53.86179°N 1.61024°W		1754–55	The house, which incorporates part of a 17th-century range, was later extended and subsequently used for other purposes. It is in gritstone and sandstone with a string course, a cornice and blocking course, and hipped slate roofs. There are two storeys and an L-shaped plan, with a symmetrical front of five bays, the middle three bays projecting under a pediment, three bays in the left return, and a rear service wing on the right. The central doorway has an entablature and a cornice on brackets, and above is a Venetian window. The other windows on the front are sashes. The rear wing has five bays and two and four storeys, and contains mullioned windows. In front of the house is a stone wall, with a pedestrian gateway near the centre. The inner gate piers are octagonal with pointed capstones, and the outer ones are square with pyramidal capstones.	II
Kitchen garden wall, Cookridge Hall; 53.86189°N 1.60889°W	—	c. 1760	The wall that encloses the north and east sides of the former kitchen garden is in red-brown brick and stone. The east wall is about 50 metres (160 ft) long, at the north end it is 5 metres (16 ft) high, ramping down to 3 metres (9.8 ft) at the south end, and it contains a pedestrian gateway.	II
Parish Hall; 53.85767°N 1.58259°W		c. 1766	Originally stables and a coach house, later a parish hall, the building is in gritstone with a stone slate roof. The central block is pedimented and has three storeys. It contains an entrance with a segmental arch and voussoirs, and small flanking lights, above which is a square window, and in the pediment is a Diocletian window and a sill band. The flanking wings are slightly recessed, with one storey, moulded eaves bands and hipped roofs, and contain oval windows on the fronts and sides.	II
Ashling and Ashling Cottage; 53.85727°N 1.58271°W		Late 18th century	A rectory incorporating material from a 17th-century or earlier house, and later converted into two private houses. The houses are in gritstone with stone slate roofs. The main range has a plinth, quoins, a sill band, two storeys, and five bays, the middle three bays projecting under a moulded pediment. In the centre is a porch with pilasters and an entablature, and the windows are sashes. The rear wing, forming the cottage, has a doorway with a chamfered surround, and a reset lintel with a flattened ogee arch, carved spandrels, and inscribed initials and a date. In the right return is a two-storey bay window.	II
Lane End Farmhouse; 53.86684°N 1.61905°W	—	Late 18th century	The farmhouse is in gritstone with quoins and a stone slate roof. There are two storeys, two bays, and a lower bay on the right. The central doorway has a plain surround, and is blocked, and a French window has been inserted to the right. The windows are mullioned with three lights, and contain casements.	II
Smithy Hall; 53.86358°N 1.61683°W	—	Late 18th century	A house, barn and smithy later combined into one house, it is in gritstone with stone slate roofs. The house has two storeys, a double-depth plan, and two bays. It contains a central doorway and small-paned windows. The barn to the left is dated 1792 and contains a segmental carriage arch, now glazed. The former smithy to the right has one storey, and contains four-light mullioned windows.	II
East stable block, Cookridge Hall; 53.86224°N 1.61104°W		1806	The stables and coach house are in gritstone with quoins and a stone slate roof. There are two storeys and three unequal bays. The narrow middle bay is gabled and contains a segmental-arched coach entrance, above which are two rectangular windows, and a lunette with a dated keystone. In the left bay are stable doors and windows, and the right bay contains a doorway with tie-stone jambs, and a loading door in the upper floor.	II
Ice house, Cookridge Hall; 53.86143°N 1.60839°W	—	c. 1820	The ice house is in gritstone, and it contains an arched doorway with a chamfered surround. Steps lead down to an underground vaulted chamber. The ice house in enclosed by a large stone wall, and the chamber is covered in earth.	II
West stable block, Cookridge Hall; 53.86221°N 1.61133°W	—	Early 19th century	The stables are in stone with a hipped slate roof. There are two storeys, three bays, and a single-storey bay projecting on the left. The middle bay of the main range projects under a pediment, and contains an elliptical carriageway with voussoirs, an impost band, and a keystone, and in the pediment is a round window. To the right is a doorway with a moulded surround and a lunette. The projecting bay contains a Venetian window.	II
Milestone at junction with New Adel Lane; 53.84937°N 1.59273°W		Early 19th century	The milestone is at the junction of Otley Road (A660 road) with New Adel Lane. It is in gritstone with a segmental top, and is about 1 metre (3 ft 3 in) high and 0.6 metres (2 ft 0 in) wide. The milestone is inscribed with the distances to nearby places, not all of which are legible.	II
Moseley Farmhouse; 53.86139°N 1.63316°W		Early 19th century	The farmhouse is in gritstone with quoins, and a stone slate roof with coped gables and kneelers. There are two storeys and three bays, the doorways have tie-stone jambs, most windows are square with plain surrounds, and at the rear is a stair window.	II
The Lodge and walls 53.85975°N 1.61493°W	—	c. 1830	Formerly the lodge to Cookridge Hall, it is in gritstone with a moulded string course, and a slate roof with a pedimented gable containing carving in the tympanum and console brackets. There are two storeys, two bays and a projecting bay. On the corner facing the road is a canted bay window, and the other windows are sashes. The curving boundary wall is low and ornamental, with a plinth, solid panels with circular piercings, and chamfered coping.	II
Memorial to Zinai Wormald; 53.85813°N 1.58382°W		1846	The memorial is in the churchyard of St John's Church, and is to the memory of Zinai Wormald. It is in gritstone, with a square plan, and a Norman-style arch on each face. On it are attached columns, a decorated entablature, moulding, a three-tier pyramidal capstone, and a cross finial.	II
Fox and Hounds Public House; 53.84788°N 1.62957°W		Mid 19th century	A house, later a public house, it is in gritstone with a slate roof, two storeys and three bays, the left bay gabled and slightly projecting. In the centre is a gabled porch containing a four-centred arch, and the windows are mullioned, with four lights in the ground floor.	II
Milestone at junction with Farrar Lane; 53.85396°N 1.59146°W		Mid 19th century	The milestone is at the junction of Otley Road (A660 road) with Farrar Lane. It is in gritstone with a cambered top and is about 1 metre (3 ft 3 in) high. It is inscribed with the distances to nearby places, not all of which are legible.	II
Adel Reformatory; 53.85255°N 1.57383°W		1857	A reform school, that was later extended and is no longer in use, it is in stone with slate roofs. There are two storeys with blocks of differing heights, and it consists of four ranges around a quadrangle. The buildings include a master's house, workshops, dormitories, kitchens, and a swimming pool with a boiler room and changing rooms. To the south is a detached chapel.	II
Cemetery Chapels and Crematorium, Lawnswood Cemetery; 53.84729°N 1.59451°W		1870–76	The two chapels linked by a colonnade were designed by George Corson and the crematorium was added in 1905. They are in Gothic Revival style and in gritstone with tile roofs. The Church of England chapel has three bays, an apse, an octagonal turret with a belfry, and a tiled spire. This is linked by an open cloister with three arches and columns in polished Aberdeen granite to the nonconformist chapel which is set at right angles. The crematorium has five bays, coped gables with ball finials, and a tall square tower with an octagonal belfry acting as a chimney.	II
Main Lodge, Lawnswood Cemetery; 53.84704°N 1.59314°W		c. 1876	The lodge was designed by George Corson and enlarged in 1915. It is in gritstone with a red tile roof. There are two storeys, and an L-shaped plan, and has an entrance bay with a hipped roof. The gabled porch projects, and contains two cross windows, a three-light mullioned window above, and a sundial in the gable. In the right return is a large mullioned and transomed window.	II
Memorial to Eliza and William Hill; 53.85731°N 1.58397°W		1884	The memorial is in the churchyard of St John's Church, and is to the memory of members of the Hill family. It is in gritstone, and consists of a cross in a Norman arch on a plinth, flanked by statues of seated angels. On the plinth are inscriptions, and the grave is enclosed by stone curbs and bollards.	II
Audus Hirst memorial 53.85738°N 1.58412°W		1884	The memorial is in the churchyard of St John's Church, and is to the memory of the Audus Hirst family. It consists of a marble statue depicting a winged figure carrying a garland. This is in an enclosure with four Composite columns carrying a roof with a pedimented gable. In the tympanum is a carved shield and scrolls, and on the entablature is an inscription.	II
Memorial and grave of Arthur Currer Briggs; 53.84701°N 1.59527°W		1908	The memorial and grave are in the grounds of Lawnswood Cemetery. The memorial is by William Hamo Thornycroft and is to the memory of Arthur Currer Briggs. It has a base of Portland stone, and contains a bronze relief depicting a sower and an angel, and above it is a triangular pediment. There are inscriptions on the pediment, and on the front and rear of the base.	II
Gravestone of George Corson; 53.84812°N 1.59291°W		1910	The gravestone is in the grounds of Lawnswood Cemetery and is to the memory of George Corson, the designer of the cemetery. It is in granite and in the form of a Celtic cross with five bosses on a low pedestal. It is about 1.75 metres (5 ft 9 in) high, and on the base are inscribed plaques.	II
Memorial and grave of Ethel Preston; 53.84697°N 1.59507°W		1911	The memorial and grave are in the grounds of Lawnswood Cemetery. The memorial is to the memory of Ethel Preston. It is in Italian marble and contains the life-size statue of a woman in Edwardian dress holding flowers. The statue stands in a porch with Corinthian columns carrying an entablature, a cornice, and a balustraded parapet. Behind the statue are double doors, slightly ajar.	II
Memorial and grave of Sam Wilson; 53.84738°N 1.59592°W		1918	The memorial and grave are in the grounds of Lawnswood Cemetery. The memorial is to the memory of Sam Wilson, and is by E. Caldwell Spruce. It has a base of splayed plinths in black marble, rising to a wall with side panels ramped down to provide bases for statues. On the wall is are bronze plaques, the lower plaque with an inscription, and the upper one with a relief depicting death and mourning. The statues are in bronze, on the sides are personifications of Faith and Benevolence, and at the top is a statue of an angel holding a torch.	II
War Memorial, Lawnswood Cemetery; 53.84934°N 1.59708°W		c. 1920	The war memorial is in Portland stone, and consists of an octagonal plinth, and a chamfered cross about 4 metres (13 ft) high, on which is a bronze sword. Behind is a screen wall about 10 metres (33 ft) long and 1.5 metres (4 ft 11 in) high with an inscription. On the wall are 16 bronze panels with the names of those lost in the First World War. To the east is a wall with the names of those lost in the Second World War.	II
Columbarium, Lawnswood Cemetery; 53.84615°N 1.59499°W		1933	The columbarium is in red brick and Portland stone with details in marble, and a pantile roof. It has a chapel with an apse containing recesses for cinerary urns. At the entrance to the chapel is a high-arched portico containing an entablature on columns. From each side of the portico run L-shaped colonnaded wings with round arches, the back walls containing inscribed plaques. The bays at the ends contain round-arched doorways with architraves and fanlights, and have hipped roofs.	II
