= Cookridge =

Suburb of Leeds in West Yorkshire, England

Coordinates: 53°51′30″N 1°37′0″W

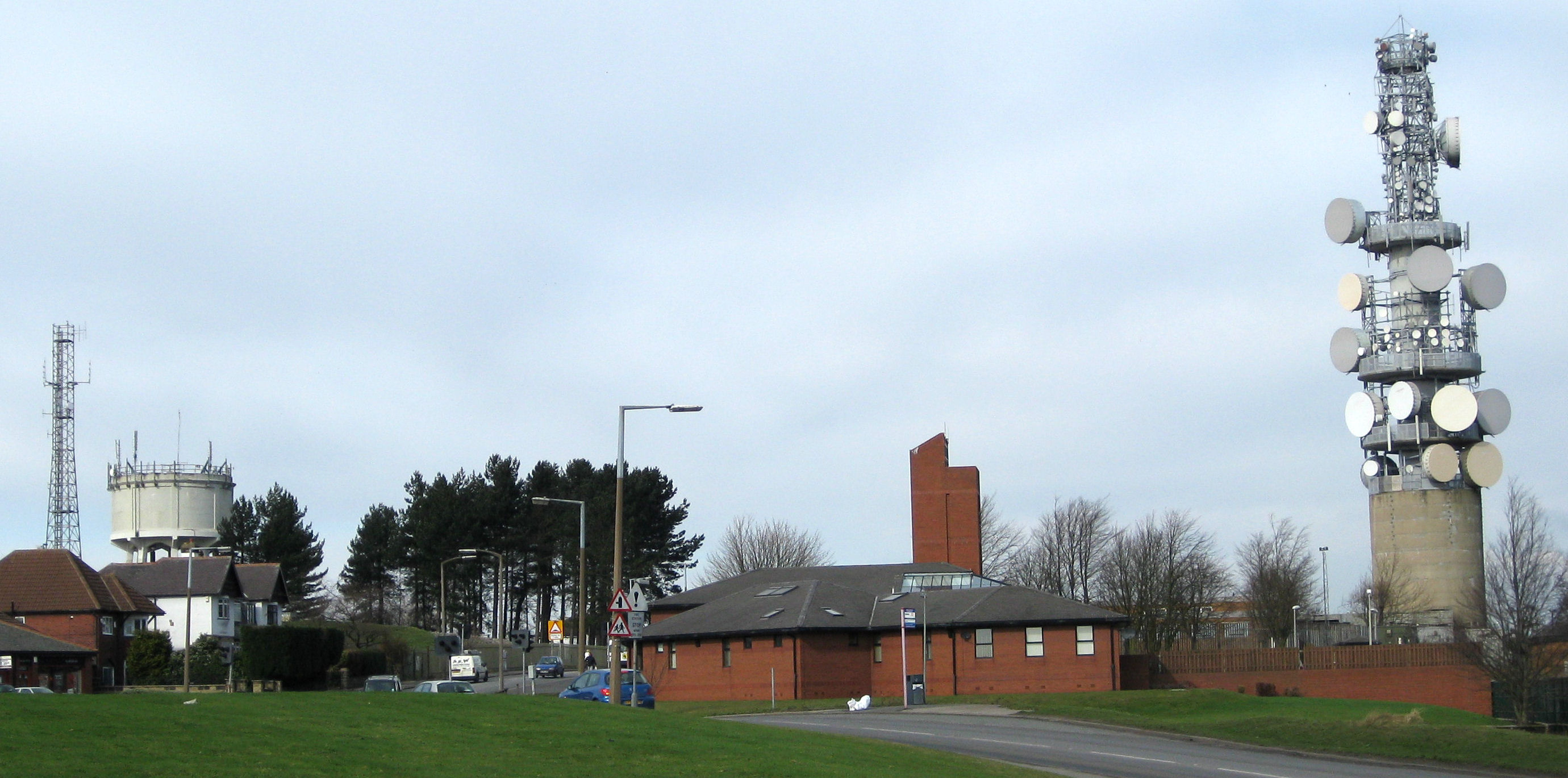
- High point on Otley Old Road, showing Tinshill Water Tower (left) Cookridge Fire Station (centre) and the Tinshill BT Tower (right)

- Location within West Yorkshire
- Metropolitan borough: City of Leeds
- Metropolitan county: West Yorkshire
- Region: Yorkshire and the Humber
- Country: England
- Sovereign state: United Kingdom
- Post town: LEEDS
- Postcode district: LS16
- Dialling code: 0113
- Police: West Yorkshire
- Fire: West Yorkshire
- Ambulance: Yorkshire
- UK Parliament: Leeds North West

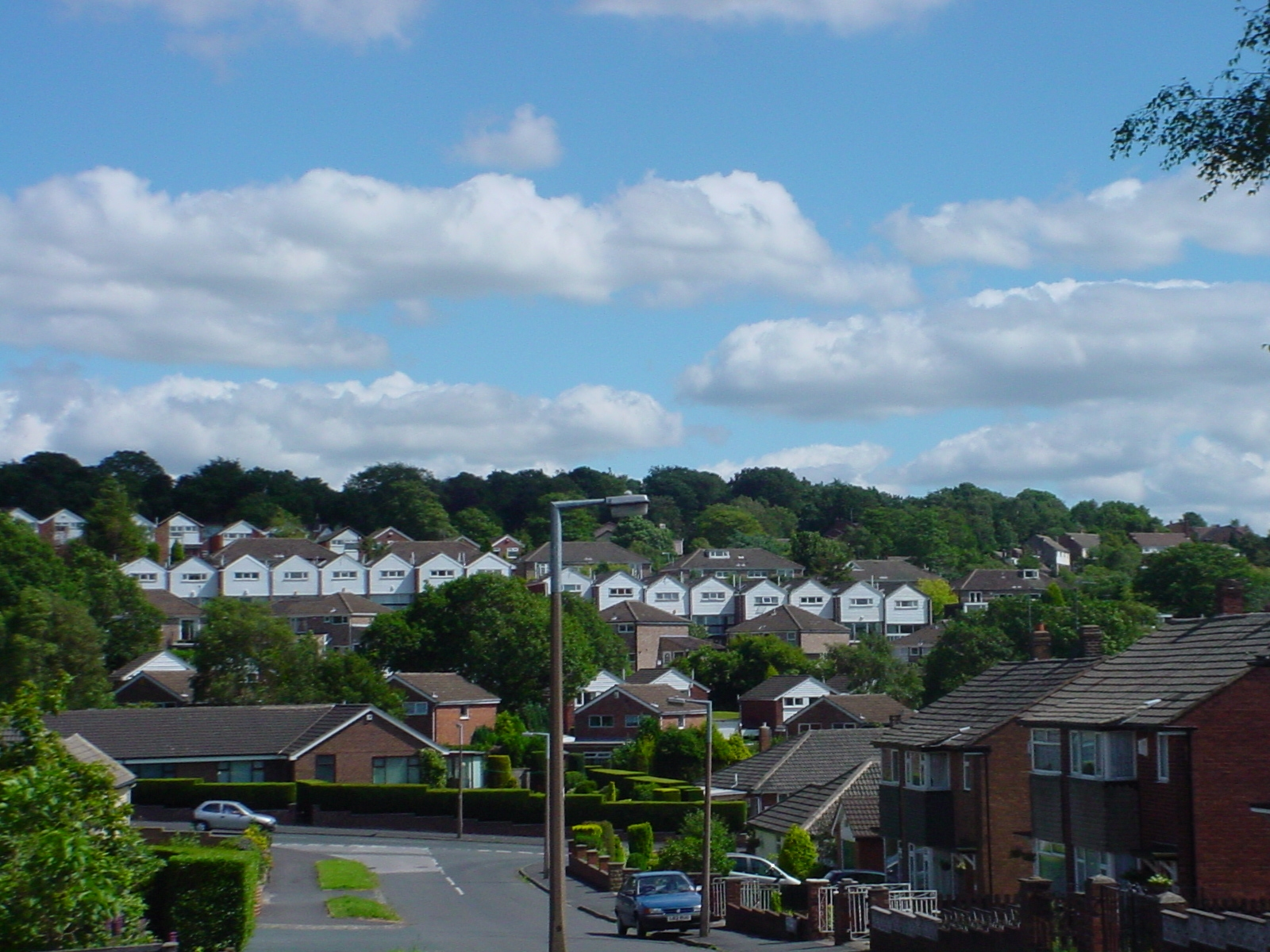
The Dale Parks from Moseley Wood area

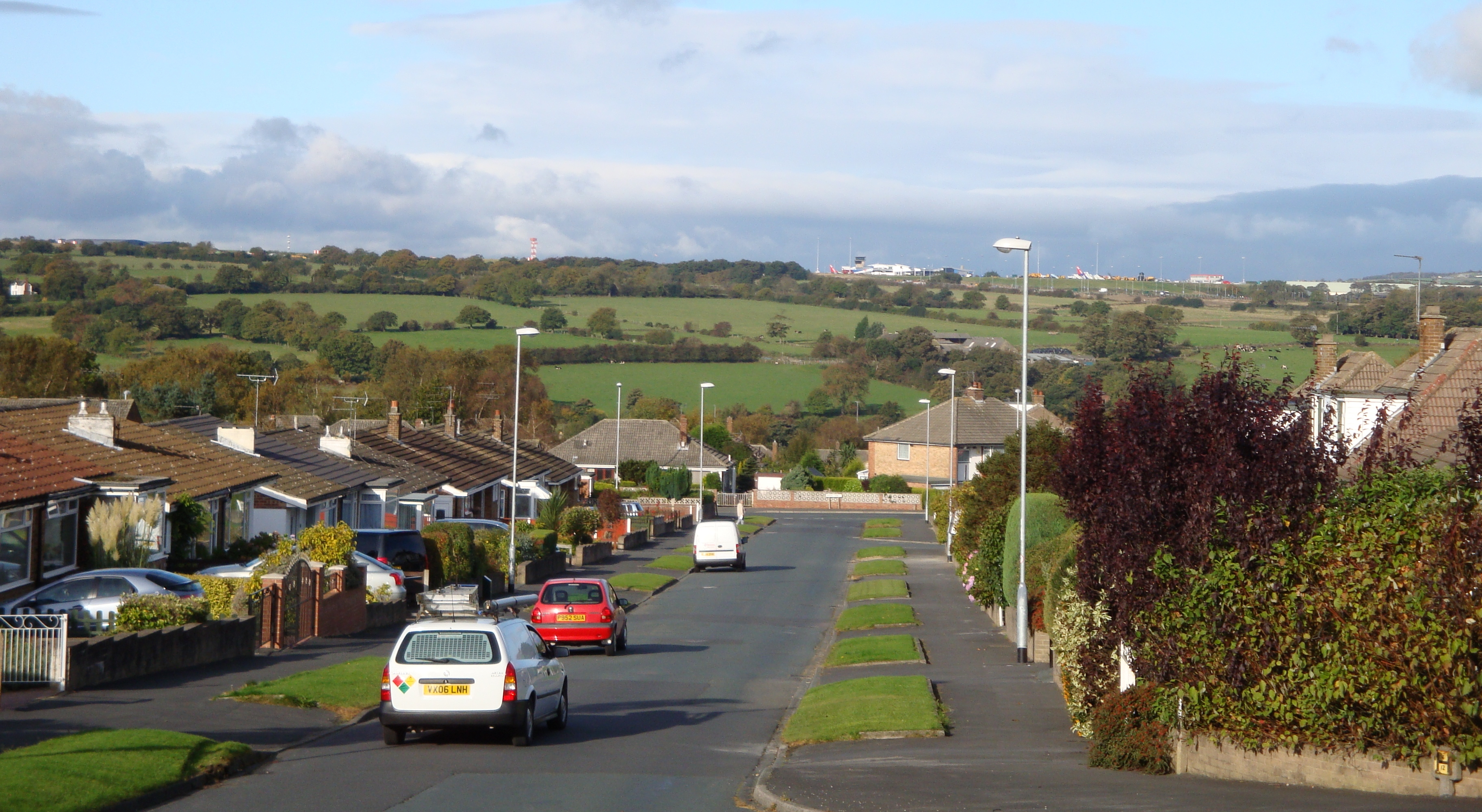
Wrenbury Crescent looking towards the airport

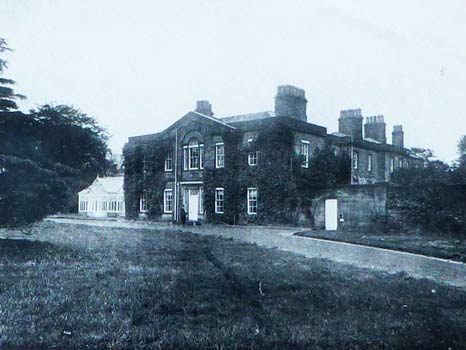
Cookridge Hall in 1919, home of the family of Mrs Muriel Winifred Middleton (née Paul)

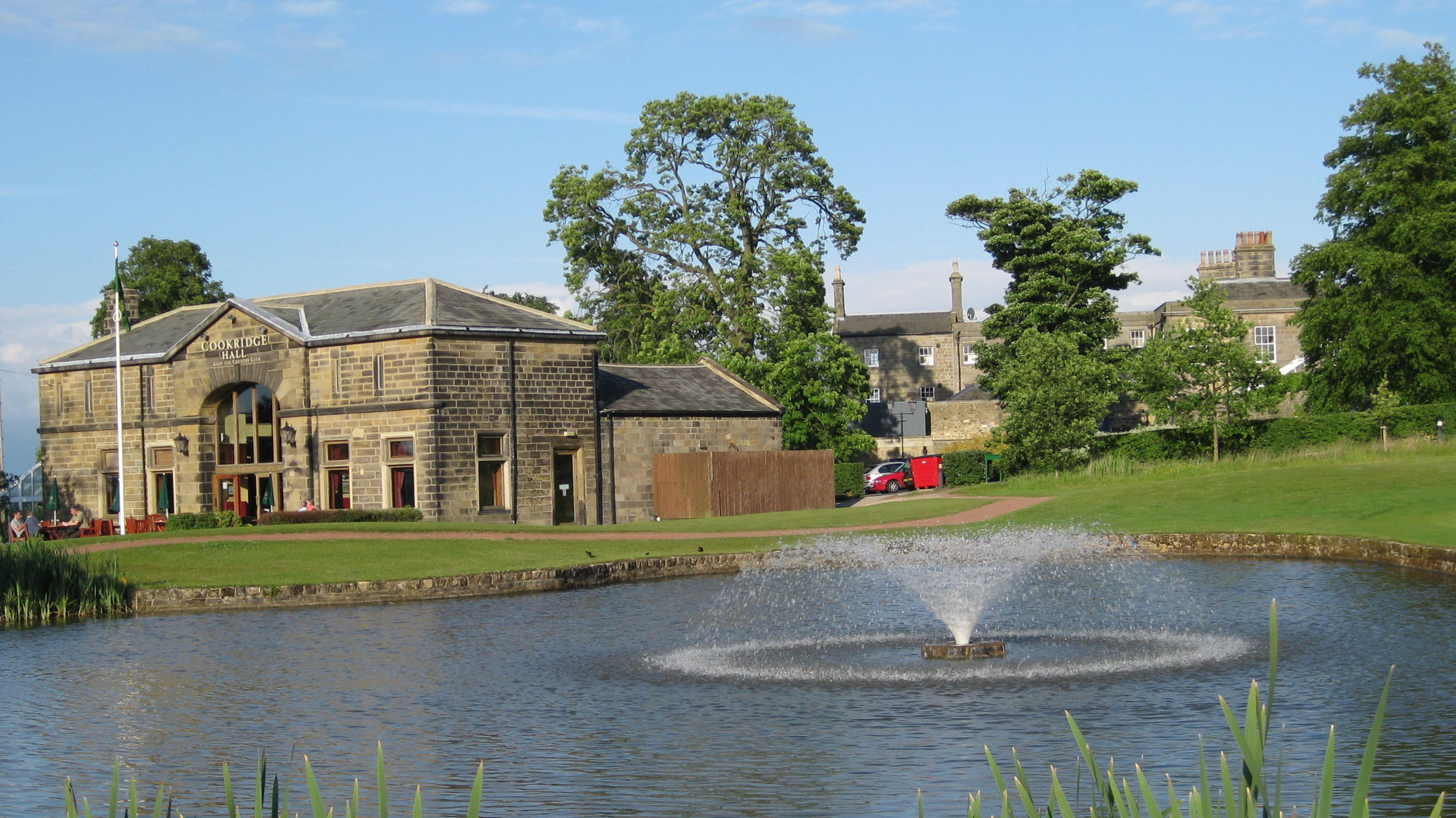
Cookridge Hall at rear with the former coach house in the forefront on the left, now the golf clubhouse

Cookridge is a suburb of north-west Leeds, West Yorkshire, England, north of the Leeds Outer Ring Road. In 1715 Ralph Thoresby described it as a village four miles from Leeds and three from Otley, dating from 1540.

A mixture of suburban and council owned properties on the border with Holt Park and Tinshill, the area sits in both the Adel & Wharfedale ward of Leeds City Council and the Leeds North West parliamentary constituency. Before 2004, the area sat within Cookridge ward, named after the area.

Nearby places include Adel, Holt Park, Tinshill, Horsforth, Bramhope, Moor Grange and Ireland Wood.

Cookridge is one of the highest points in Leeds, with the elevation rising to 198 m (650 ft) above sea level close to the water tower on the eastern edge of the suburb.

Cookridge holds an annual scarecrow festival hosted by the Leeds Modernians.

== Geography ==
Cookridge is located in the foothills of the eastern Pennines. Elevation ranges from 120 m (390 ft) above sea level close to Moseley Beck behind Horsforth railway station to 198 m (650 ft) above sea level by the water tower. Because of its higher elevation it experiences a cooler, windier and wetter climate compared to many other parts of Leeds, and is very exposed to easterly winds. The Beast from the East in February/March 2018 brought heavy snowfall and severe drifting to the area.

== Etymology ==
The name of Cookridge is first attested in the Domesday Book of 1086, as Cucheric. The second element of the name is agreed to come from an Old English word *ric ('narrow strip of land'), attested only in place-names. The origin of the first element is less certain: it could perhaps be from an otherwise unattested personal name, inferred to have been *Cuca, or from a variant of the attested word cwica ('quickset hedge, hedge grown from (hawthorn) cuttings'). Thus the name might once have meant 'Cuca's narrow strip of land' and 'narrow strip of land demarcated by a quickset hedge').

== History and buildings ==
The area had the natural geographic boundaries of the Moseley Beck on the West and South, the Marsh Beck to the North, and the old trackway to the East, running roughly North-South along the line of Spen Lane. A Roman road passing East-West was excavated in 1966 going through Golden Acre Park, south of Marsh Beck. The area later became part of the Kingdom of Elmet, being conquered by the Angles in the 7th century, leading to the Old English name that survives to the present. It was the Danes in the 9th century who named the nearby hill "Tyndr's Hill", now Tinshill.

In the Domesday Book it was listed as the manor of Cucheric, with farmland enough for two ploughs and woodland of 9 square furlongs (36 hectares). In the 12th century, the lands were granted to the monks of Kirkstall Abbey, and in the 13th century the manor became a "vill" or township, part of Cugerig and Adel. The monastery lands were confiscated by Henry VIII and sold off from 1540; this included Cookridge Grange, the site of the present Cookridge Hall.

== Cookridge Hall and the Paul and Middleton families ==
Early buildings on the Cookridge Hall estate were of wood, thatch, wattle etc., but in the 17th century substantial stone buildings, several which are still in existence, began to be constructed including Cookridge Hall itself. William Paul commenced business in Kirkstall Road, Leeds, in 1876. It closed in 1968. In 1890, Paul took up residence at Cookridge Hall and the Paul family remained there until 1954 when the estate was sold by the executors of T. W. Paul. The London Gazette records that in 1899 James Arthur Paul – later of Bramhope Hall – was living with his father, William Paul at Cookridge Hall.

Muriel Winifred Middleton née Paul (1904–1979) was the daughter of Lt. Col. James Arthur Paul and had married Major Arthur Daryl Middleton in 1933. Muriel's sister Kathleen Mary Alexandra Paul married Geoffrey Herbert Kitson. They had a son Sir Timothy Kitson M.P. Muriel's brother Peter Graham Paul had attended Rugby in the 1920s as had Thomas Neil Paul, recorded as the "second son of the late T.W. Paul of Cookridge Hall". Peter married Margaret Helen Hudson of Robert Hudson Ltd (engineers). A large pond named Paul's Pond remains on the Cookridge Estate, having been named after William Paul, the grandfather of Muriel Winifred Middleton.

The builders of Cookridge Hall used "rough rock" or boulders which still are still found in the landscape or quarried in fields known as "quarrels". In the 18th century, Cookridge Hall was substantially remodelled, and many other buildings were improved, with stone replacing thatch. At this time the road through Cookridge became busier with coaches from 1754 and earned money as a turnpike. Milestones and mounting stones from the period still survive. There were also more mills along Moseley Beck, notably the Silk Mill (demolished 1978) which gave its name to modern housing estate. The Hall, which dates from c. 1764, along with its flanking screen walls, gate piers and gates, is a Grade II listed building. It was a home for people with epilepsy from 1955 to 1990 and in 1997 was opened by the Lord Mayor of Leeds as a leisure club with a golf course.

In the 19th century a new road was constructed (now the A660 Otley Road), and the Bramhope Tunnel dug by Moseley farm for a rail line going north from Leeds to Harrogate. A large house called Cookridge Lodge and a tower added. It was demolished in 1970 to make way for an estate, but the gatepost and some outbuildings survive. The Cookridge Estate was bought by Richard Wormald in 1820 and land was sold in portions by his descendant Francis Wormald in the 1920s. In 1926 Cookridge became part of Leeds and the building of Cookridge village began in 1927 with a triangle of houses between Cookridge Lane, Moseley Wood Lane and Green Lane. This was largely under the direction of architect Cecil Crowther and his builder brothers, taking advantage of subsidies from the Housing Acts of 1923–1925. Mavis Lane and Mavis Avenue are named after Cecil Crowther's daughter. Crowther acted as estate agent and produced a 1930 brochure entitled Cookridge – Village of Youth extolling its virtues for newly-weds. This included a map showing 135 plots of an area largely bounded by Cookridge Lane to the east, Moseley Wood Lane to the south, and Cookridge Avenue to the north-west. There were six firms of builders, with different styles. Sporadic building continued, but it was after the Second World War that the majority of the estates were constructed, starting with 1948 Iveson and Ireland Wood; 1952 Tinshill, Silkmill and Woodnook; 1957 Moseley Wood; 1973 Holt Park; 1980 Spring Wood. As the names suggest, these made major encroachments into woodland.

The water-tower was built in 1929 to supply Cookridge village on one of the highest points in Leeds at 198m (650 feet) above sea level. Near the water-tower is Tinshill BT Tower (also known as Cookridge Tower), a prominent landmark.

== Sport ==
Cookridge has three sports clubs: Cookridge Cricket Club, Cookridge Hall Golf Club, and the Leeds Modernians Sports Club which has football, rugby and cricket teams. Bannatyne Group acquired Cookridge Hall in 2019.

== Cookridge Hospital ==
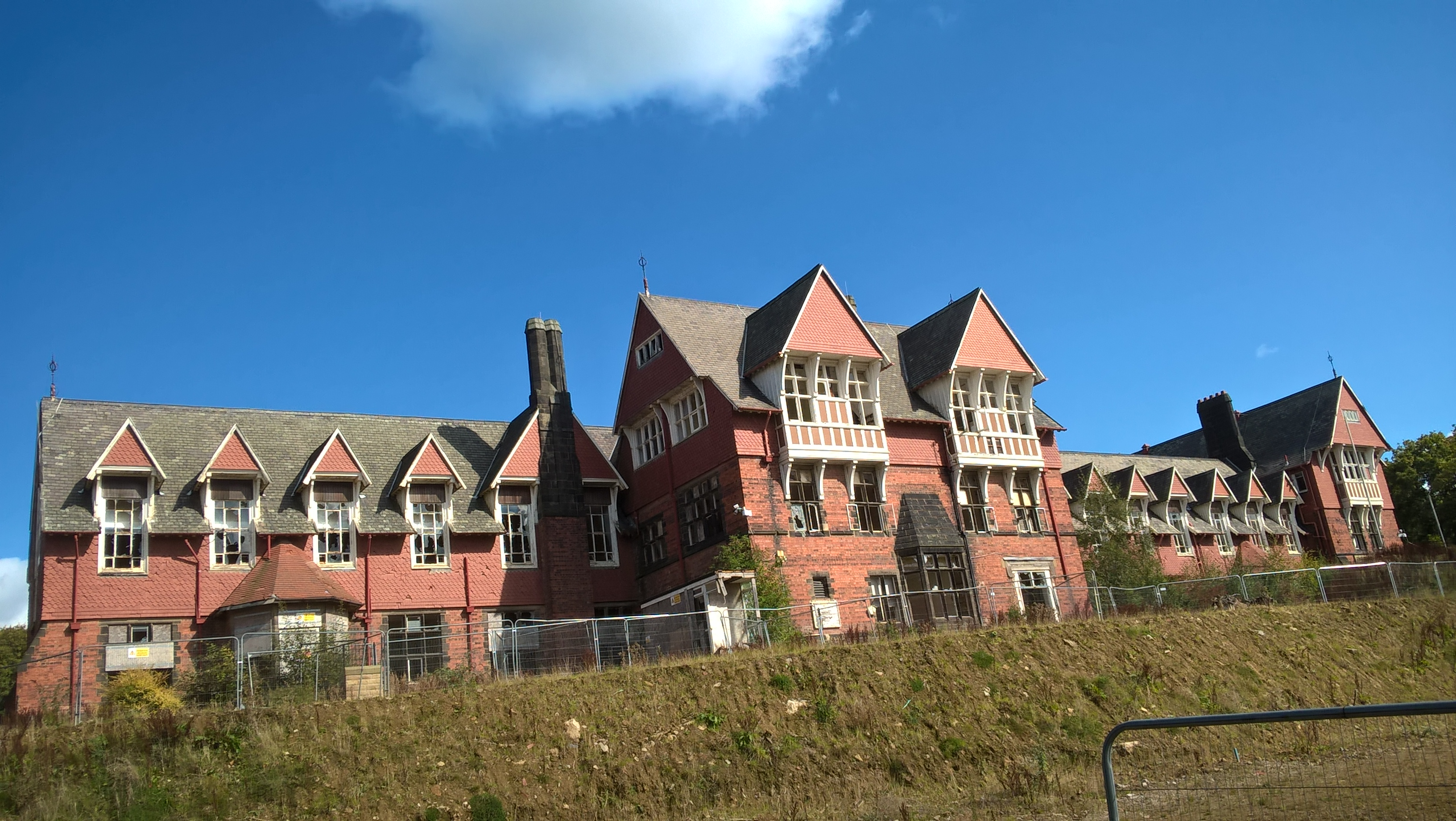
Cookridge Hospital Main Building

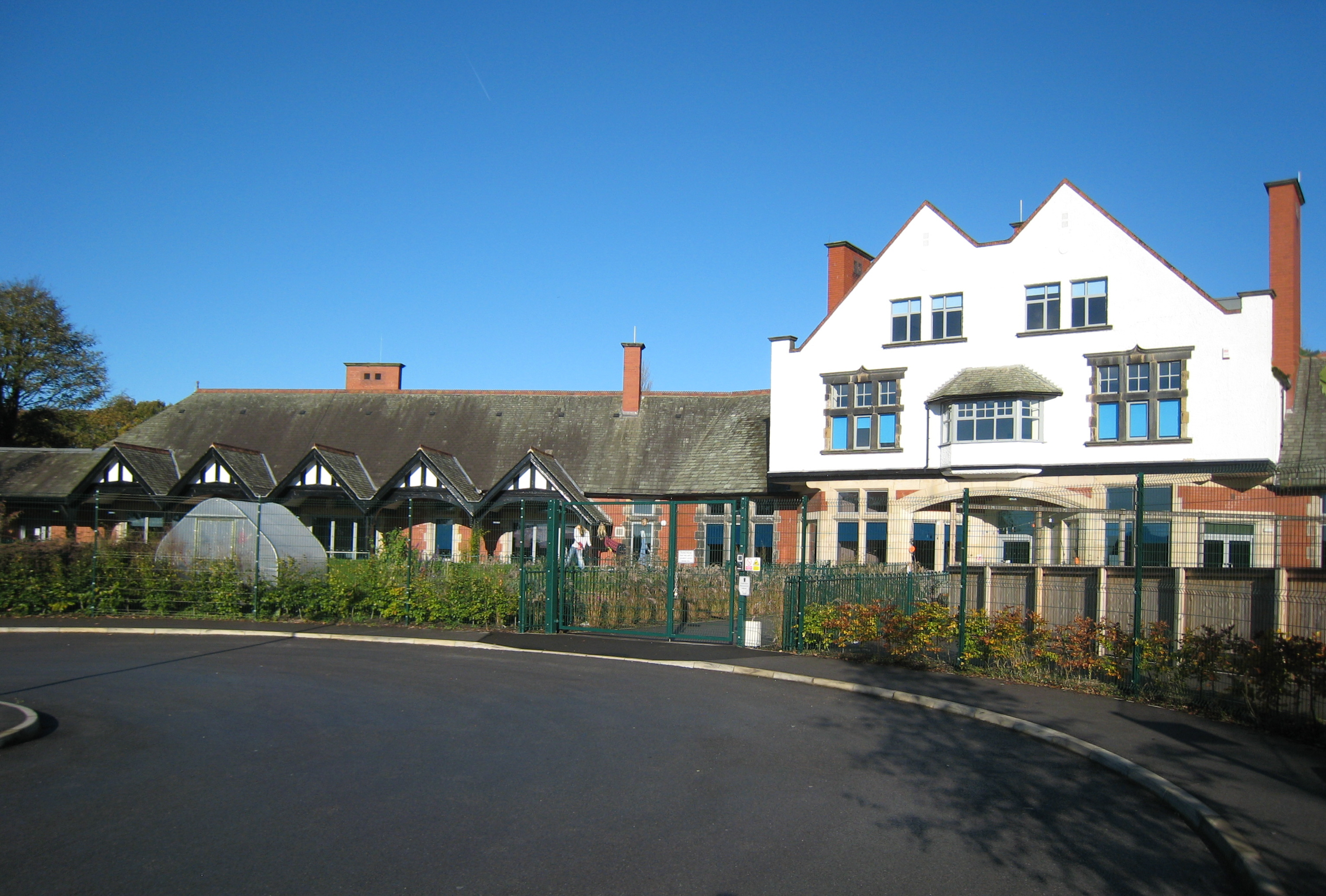
Former Robert Arthington Hospital building, now a school

Cookridge Hospital opened in 1869 as a 'Hospital for the Convalescent Poor in Leeds'. It was built in a secluded area by clearing away part of Ireland Wood, with a new road, Hospital Lane from Otley Old Road. The main building and the lodge, designed by Norman Shaw in 1868, are Grade II listed buildings. A further wing was added in 1893, the Edward Jackson Memorial Ward. In 1888 a second set of buildings was opened, the Ida Hospital, named in memory of Ida North, by her father John North. A further similar set of buildings was opened in 1905 named after the benefactor as Robert Arthington Hospital.

The buildings mainly functioned as longer-term convalescent facilities for patients treated in other Leeds hospitals, and were used for the care of wounded servicemen during both World Wars. The whole complex was taken over by the Government in 1939 and part used as a maternity hospital until 1942. In 1952 it became part of the NHS. A 'High Energy Radiation Centre', providing treatment of tumours opened in 1956. From then on it developed into a major regional centre for radiotherapy, with the Ida and Robert Arthington Hospitals becoming home to the Yorkshire Regional Cancer Organization in 1994.

In 2007 it closed and all facilities were transferred to the St James's Oncology Unit (Bexley Wing) of Leeds Teaching Hospitals NHS Trust.

Much of the site was used for housing from 2010, with the listed building being retained for future development. The Robert Arthington Hospital was refurbished and opened in 2015 as the Lighthouse School for pupils with autistic spectrum conditions.

== Religion ==
The Church of England parish church was formerly that of St John the Baptist Church, Adel until Holy Trinity, a brick building on Green Lane, was constructed in 1961. Cookridge Methodist Church is a brick building on the junction of Tinshill Road and Otley Old Road. Grace Community Church meets at Cookridge Village Hall.

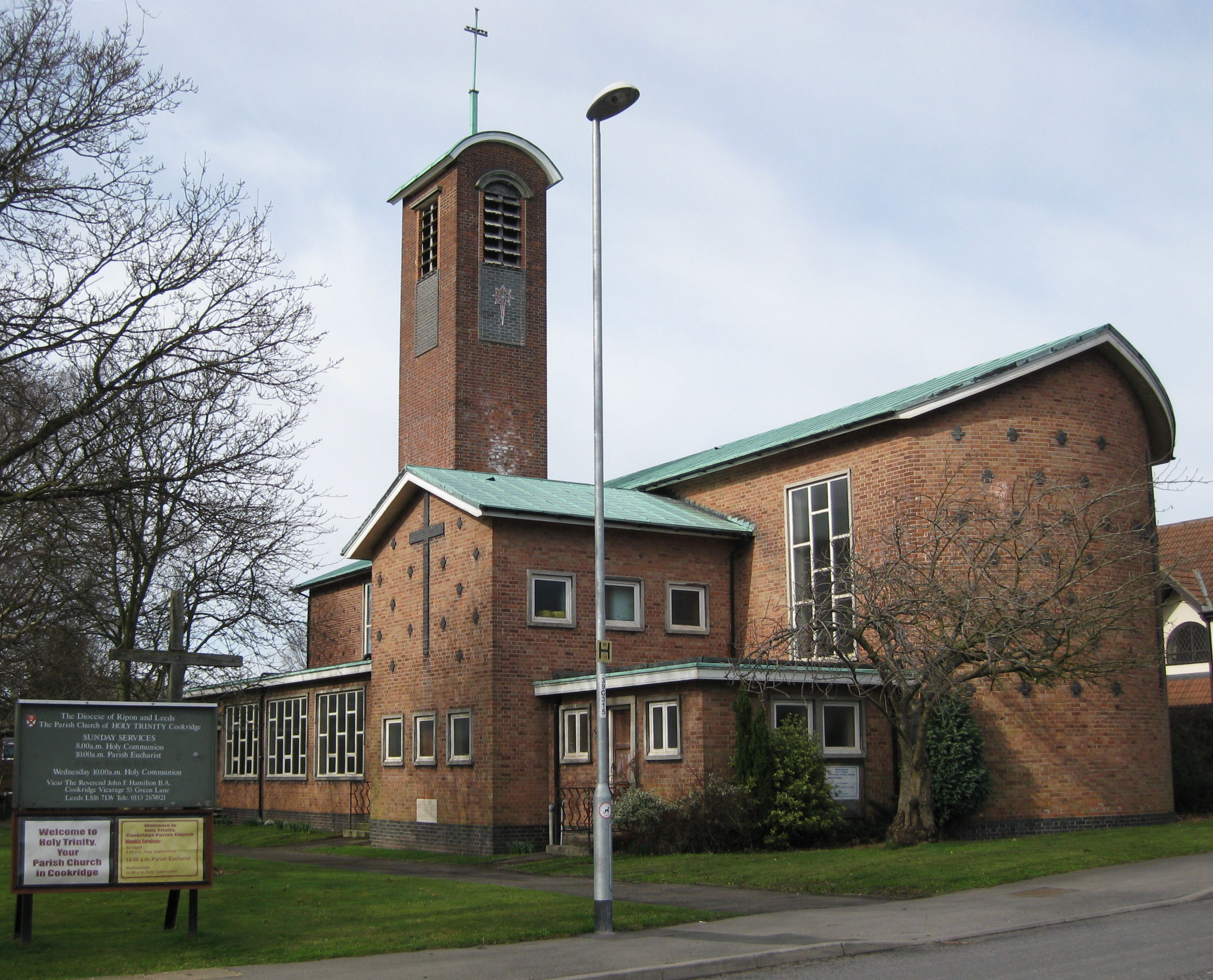
Holy Trinity Church

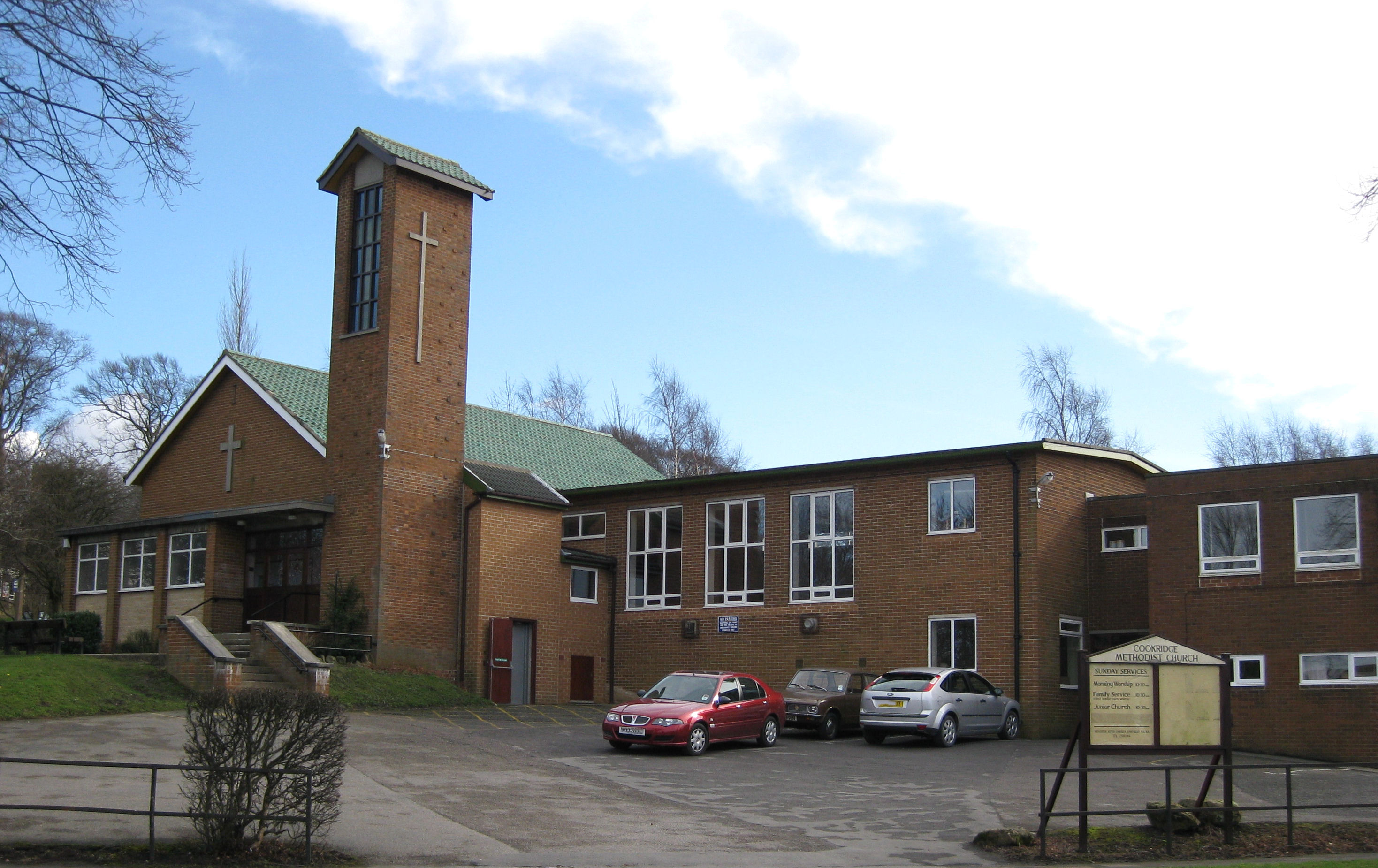
Cookridge Methodist Church

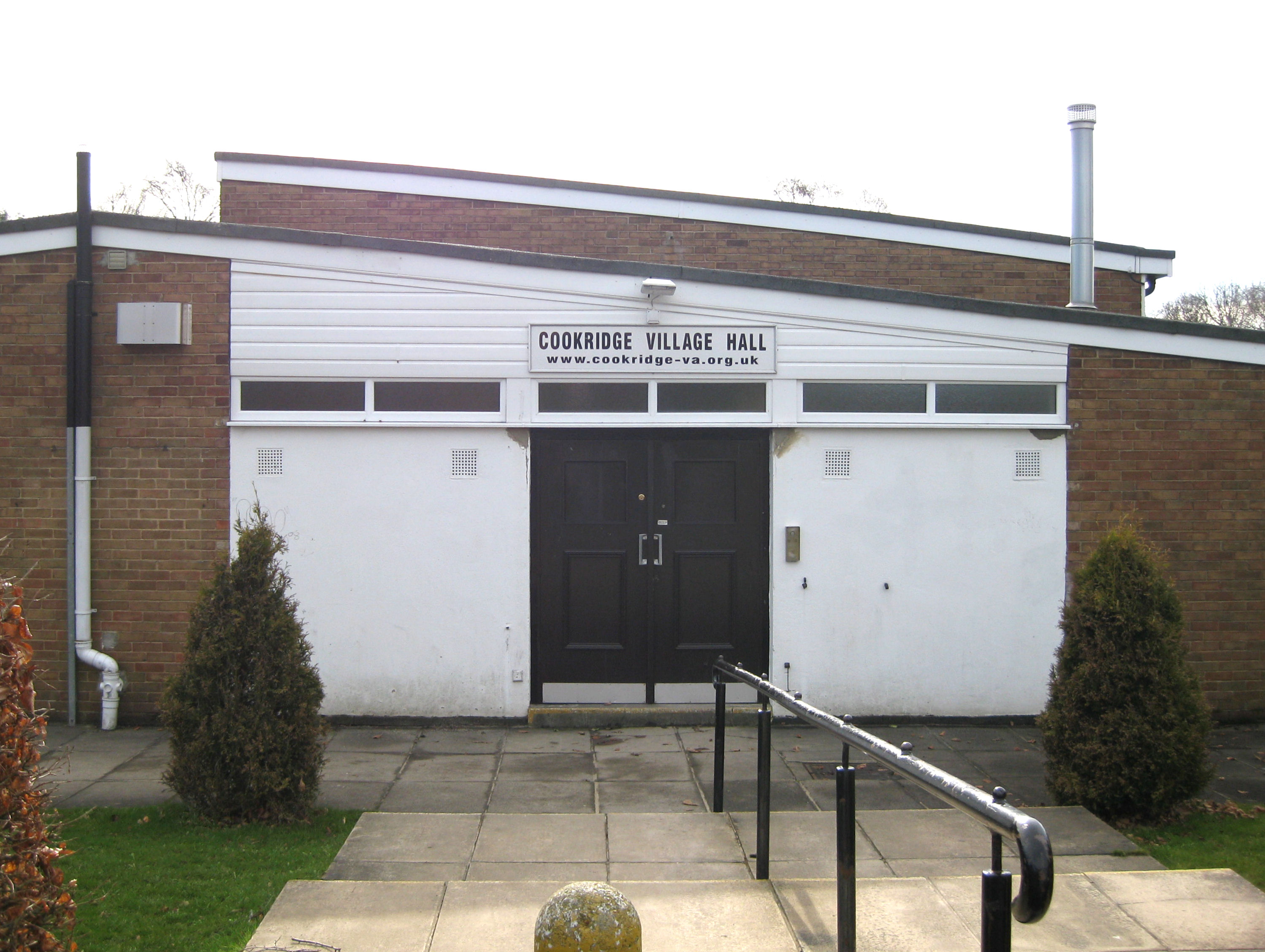
Cookridge Village Hall

== Education ==
The main primary schools in Cookridge are Holy Trinity Church of England (Aided) Primary School and Cookridge Primary School.

== Notable people ==
- Nick Hodgson, former drummer of the Kaiser Chiefs, was born here.

== See also ==
- Listed buildings in Leeds (Adel and Wharfedale Ward)
