= Corson =

Corson may refer to:

== Places ==
United States

- Corson County, South Dakota
- Corson, South Dakota
- Corson Inlet, a strait on the southern coast of New Jersey
- Corson's Inlet State Park, New Jersey

Other

- Corson, the main street of Linköping University's Campus Valla, Östergötland, Sweden

== Others ==
- Corson (surname)
- USS Corson (AVP-37), a United States Navy seaplane tender in commission from 1944 to 1946 and from 1951 to 1956
- Corson (singer), French singer, songwriter
- Corson (demon), one of the four principal kings that have power on the seventy-two demons
