= Albert Mountain =

English soldier who received the Victoria Cross

- Sgt Albert Mountain VC
- Born: 19 April 1897; Leeds, West Riding of Yorkshire
- Died: 7 January 1967 (aged 69); Leeds
- Burial place: Lawnswood Crematorium, Leeds
- Military career
- Allegiance: United Kingdom
- Branch: British Army
- Rank: Sergeant
- Units: The Prince of Wales's Own (West Yorkshire Regiment)
- Conflicts: World War I
- Awards: Victoria Cross; Croix de guerre (France); Médaille militaire

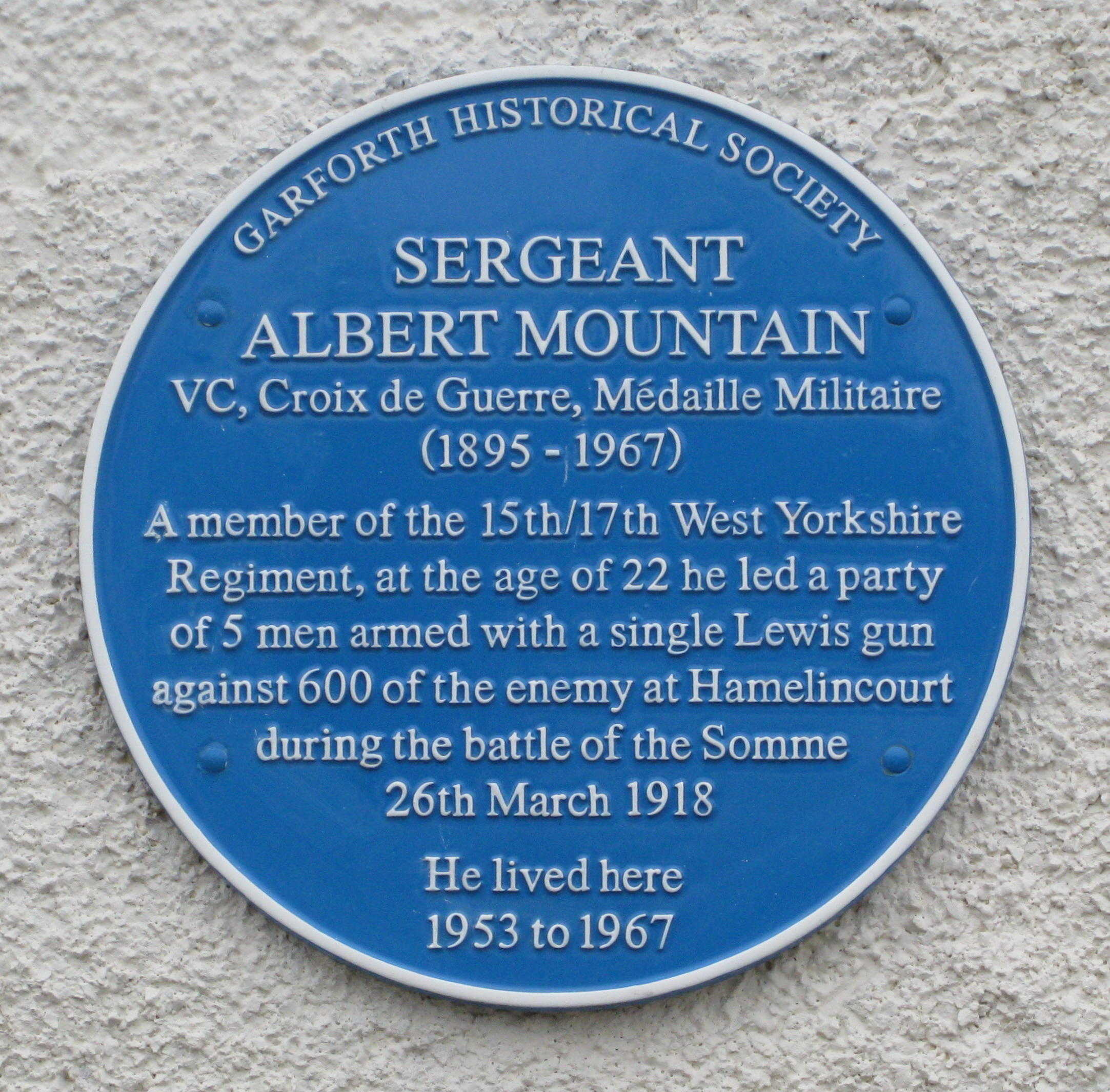
Plaque in Garforth, Leeds, where he lived from 1953 till his death

Albert Mountain VC (19 April 1897 – 7 January 1967) was an English recipient of the Victoria Cross during the First World War, the highest and most prestigious award for gallantry in the face of the enemy that can be awarded to British and Commonwealth forces.

Mountain won his VC on 26 March 1918 at Hamelincourt, France, while serving as a sergeant in the 15/17th Battalion (Leeds Pals), The Prince of Wales's Own (West Yorkshire Regiment), British Army. The citation for his VC reads:

For most conspicuous bravery and devotion to duty during an enemy attack, when his Company was in an exposed position on a sunken road, having hastily dug themselves in. Owing to the intense artillery fire, they were obliged to vacate the road and fall back. The enemy in the meantime was advancing in mass, preceded by an advanced patrol about 200 strong. The situation was critical, and volunteers for a counter-attack were called for. Sjt. Mountain immediately stepped forward, and his party of ten men followed him. He then advanced on the flank with a Lewis gun and brought enfilade fire to bear on the enemy patrol, killing about 100.

In the meantime the remainder of the Company made a frontal attack, and the entire enemy patrol was cut up and thirty prisoners taken.

At this time the enemy main body appeared and the men, who were numerically many times weaker than the enemy, began to waver.

Sjt. Mountain rallied and organised his party and formed a defensive position from which to cover the retirement of the rest of the Company and the prisoners. With this party of one non-commissioned officer and four men he successfully held at bay 600 of the enemy for half an hour, eventually retiring and rejoining his Company.

He then took command of the flank post of the Battalion which was "in the air", and held on there for 27 hours until finally surrounded by the enemy.

Sjt. Mountain was one of the few who managed to fight their way back.

His supreme fearlessness and initiative undoubtedly saved the whole situation.

He was also awarded the Croix de guerre and Médaille militaire (France).

His Victoria Cross is displayed at The Prince of Wales's Own Regiment of Yorkshire Museum, York, England.

== Bibliography ==
- Buzzell, Nora, ed. (1997). The Register of the Victoria Cross. Cheltenham, Gloucestershire: This England Alma House. ISBN 0-906324-27-0.
- Gliddon, Gerald (2013) [2004]. Spring Offensive 1918. VCs of the First World War. Stroud, Gloucestershire: The History Press. ISBN 978-0-7524-8730-4.
- Harvey, David (2000). Monuments to Courage. Naval & Military Press Ltd. ISBN 1-84342-356-1.
