= Ethel Preston memorial =

Memorial in Leeds, West Yorkshire, England

Coordinates: 53°50′49.5″N 1°35′42.7″W

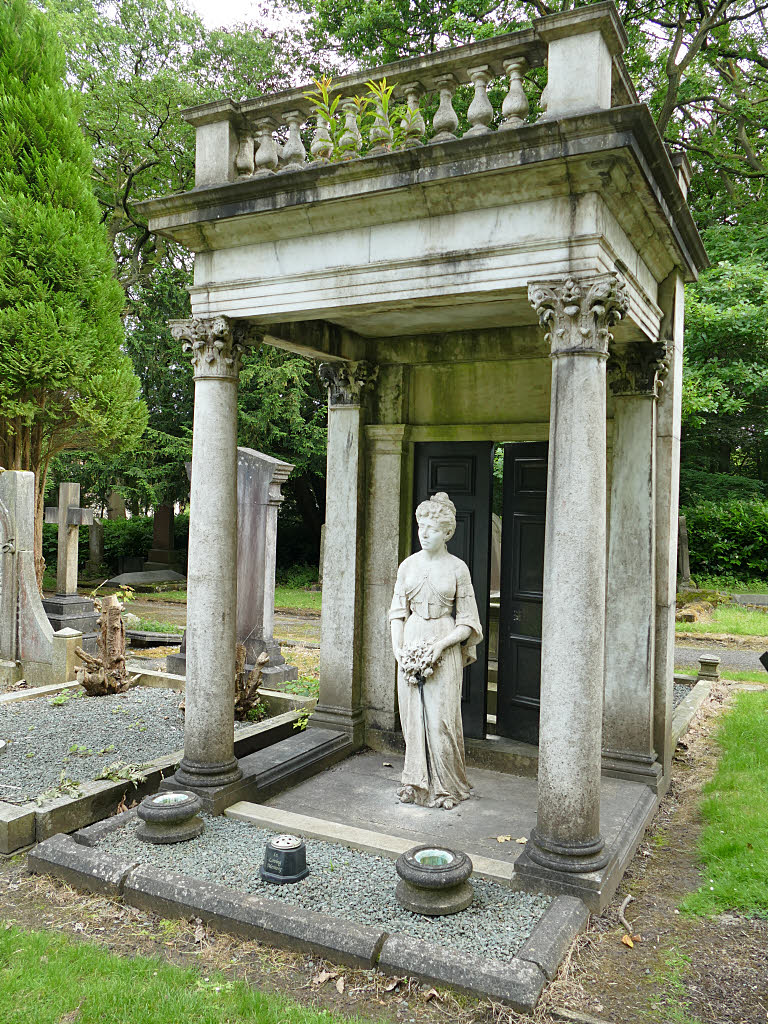
The memorial in 2020

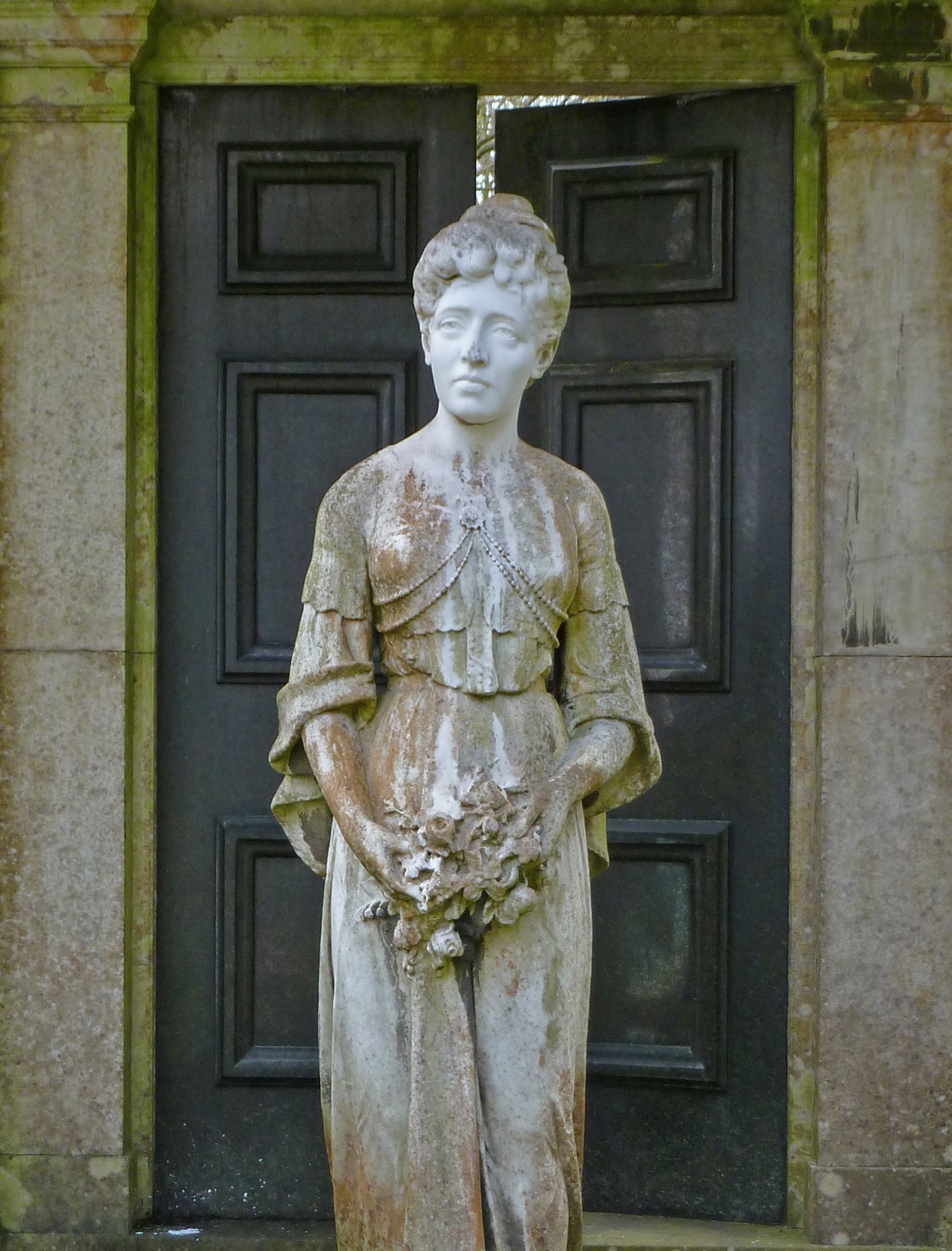
Detail of statue in 2012

The Ethel Preston memorial, also known as Ethel at the Gate, is a grade II listed grave monument from 1913 in Lawnswood Cemetery, Leeds, England.

== Description ==
The memorial marks the graves of husband and wife Ethel and Walter Preston. The principal feature is a life-sized statue of Ethel, holding a bouquet and wearing the costume of a choir that she sang in. Ethel stands within a classical-style porch rendered in white Italian marble, reputedly modelled after the portico of the Prestons' house (now demolished), the Grange in Beeston. The roof of the porch is supported on four composite order columns. To the rear of the statue is a depiction of an entrance-way with black marble panelled doors, shown slightly ajar. The roof is formed of an entablature with a cornice detail above and a balustraded parapet on the top.

The memorial has two inscriptions; the first is to Ethel noting that she died 24 March 1911 at the age of 50, and that she was married to Walter and lived at The Grange. The second inscription is to Walter and notes that he died on 24 October 1930 and had been married to Ethel and then to an Emily.

== History ==
Ethel died at her home in 1911; within a year Walter had married his 22-year-old housekeeper Emily Florence Richardson. Walter, an industrial chemist, had the memorial erected in 1913 and said he had been inspired by similar graves he had seen in Italy. There are two suggestions as to the inspiration for the monument. The first is that it symbolises the love between the couple and depicts Ethel in the entrance to her house waiting for her husband to return home. The open door indicates that she waits to be reunited with her husband in death. The other is that it is a mark of regret by Walter for his womanising and that this is reflected in the sad expression on the face of the statue. The sculptor of the piece is not known.

After its 1913 unveiling the memorial was visited by thousands of people, who each paid a penny for the privilege. The cost of the monument was stated in a 1913 news report as being £2,000 but a 1930 report has it costing £5,000. The memorial received statutory protection on 11 September 1996 as a grade II listed building. Since the 2000s fresh flowers have often been left in the statue's arms.

== See also ==
- Listed buildings in Leeds (Adel and Wharfedale Ward)
