= Corson (surname) =

Corson is a Scottish surname. Notable people with the surname include:

- Dale Corson (1914–2012), American physicist and academic administrator
- Dan Corson (born 1964), American artist
- Fred Pierce Corson (1896–1985), American Methodist bishop
- George Corson (1829–1910), British architect
- James Corson (1906–1981), American discus thrower
- Joseph K. Corson (1836-1913), American military officer
- Juliet Corson (1841–1897), leader in cookery education
- Harvey Corson, American academic administrator
- Hiram Corson (1828–1911), American professor of literature
- Samuel Corson (1909–1990), American psychiatrist
- Shayne Corson (born 1966), Canadian hockey player
