= Lawnswood =

Suburb of Leeds, England

Coordinates: 53.85°N 1.60°W

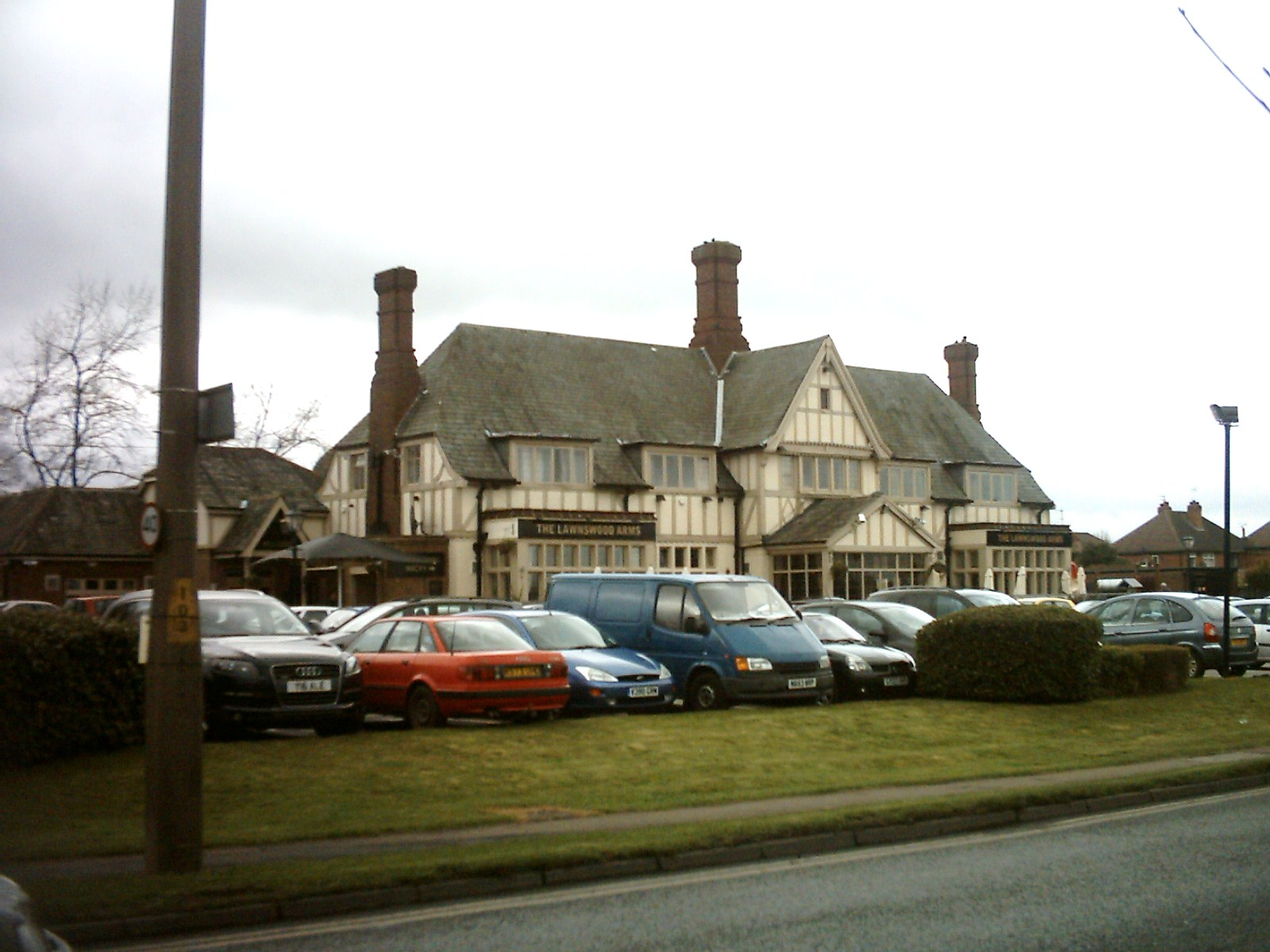
- The Lawnswood Arms

- Location within West Yorkshire
- OS grid reference: SE2638
- Metropolitan borough: City of Leeds
- Metropolitan county: West Yorkshire
- Region: Yorkshire and the Humber
- Country: England
- Sovereign state: United Kingdom
- Post town: LEEDS
- Postcode district: LS16
- Dialling code: 0113
- Police: West Yorkshire
- Fire: West Yorkshire
- Ambulance: Yorkshire
- UK Parliament: Leeds North West

Lawnswood is a small suburb in the north west of the city of Leeds in West Yorkshire, England. As such it is in the north north east of the West Yorkshire Urban Area. The suburb falls within the Adel and Wharfedale Ward of the City of Leeds Council.

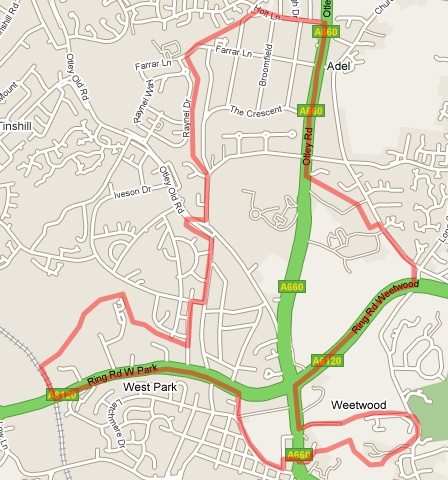
The Boundaries of Lawnswood

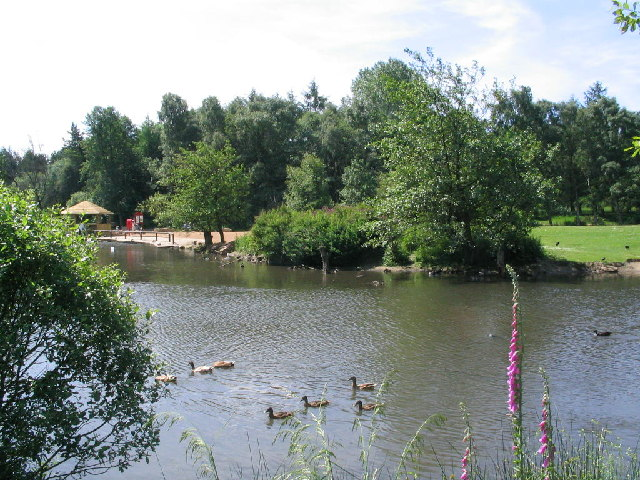
Golden Acre Park lies to the North of Lawnswood separating it from Bramhope

== Location ==
It is bordered by West Park, Adel, Ireland Wood and Holt Park. The A660 Leeds to Otley road runs through the area.

== University influences ==
Bodington Hall, a former major hall of residence for the University of Leeds was in Lawnswood and it was not uncommon to find some students taking accommodation in Lawnswood after their first year. Also, when considering Lawnswood School as part of Lawnswood, one must also regard Oxley Hall as if not in Lawnswood itself, then on the very border of Lawnswood and Headingley or Weetwood. Oxley, as it is affectionately known, is also a major hall of residence of the University of Leeds. The Stables Pub and the Lawnswood Arms are both occasionally, but rarely, visited by students doing the Otley Run.

== Transport ==
Lawnswood is 4 miles (6 km) north of Leeds city centre and its nearest railway station is in Horsforth.

Lawnswood is served by regular buses on the First Leeds Overground Lines that pass through the area towards the Leeds city centre.

- Brown Line (1)
- Sky Line (6)
- Pink Line (18 18A)
- Unilink (95)

Supertram Lawnswood and Bodington Hall were two of the planned stops on the Leeds Supertram North Line. The Supertram project was cancelled by the Government in 2005 much to the disappointment of many Lawnswood residents.

== Politics ==
The area is in the parliamentary constituency, Leeds Central and Headingley, represented by Alex Sobel MP. In terms of local politics, Lawnswood constitutes a large portion of the council ward, Weetwood.

== Housing ==
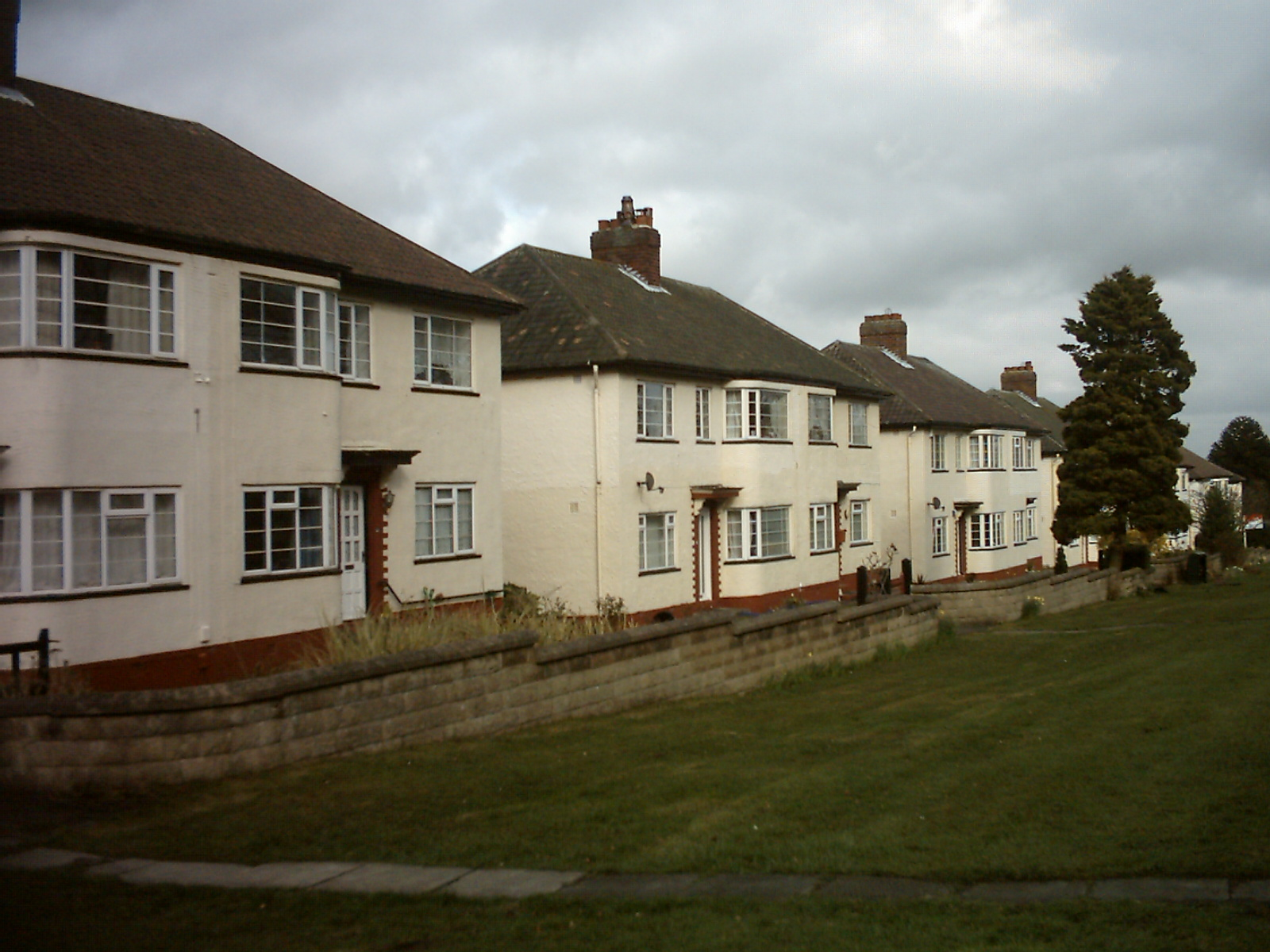
1930s housing in Lawnswood

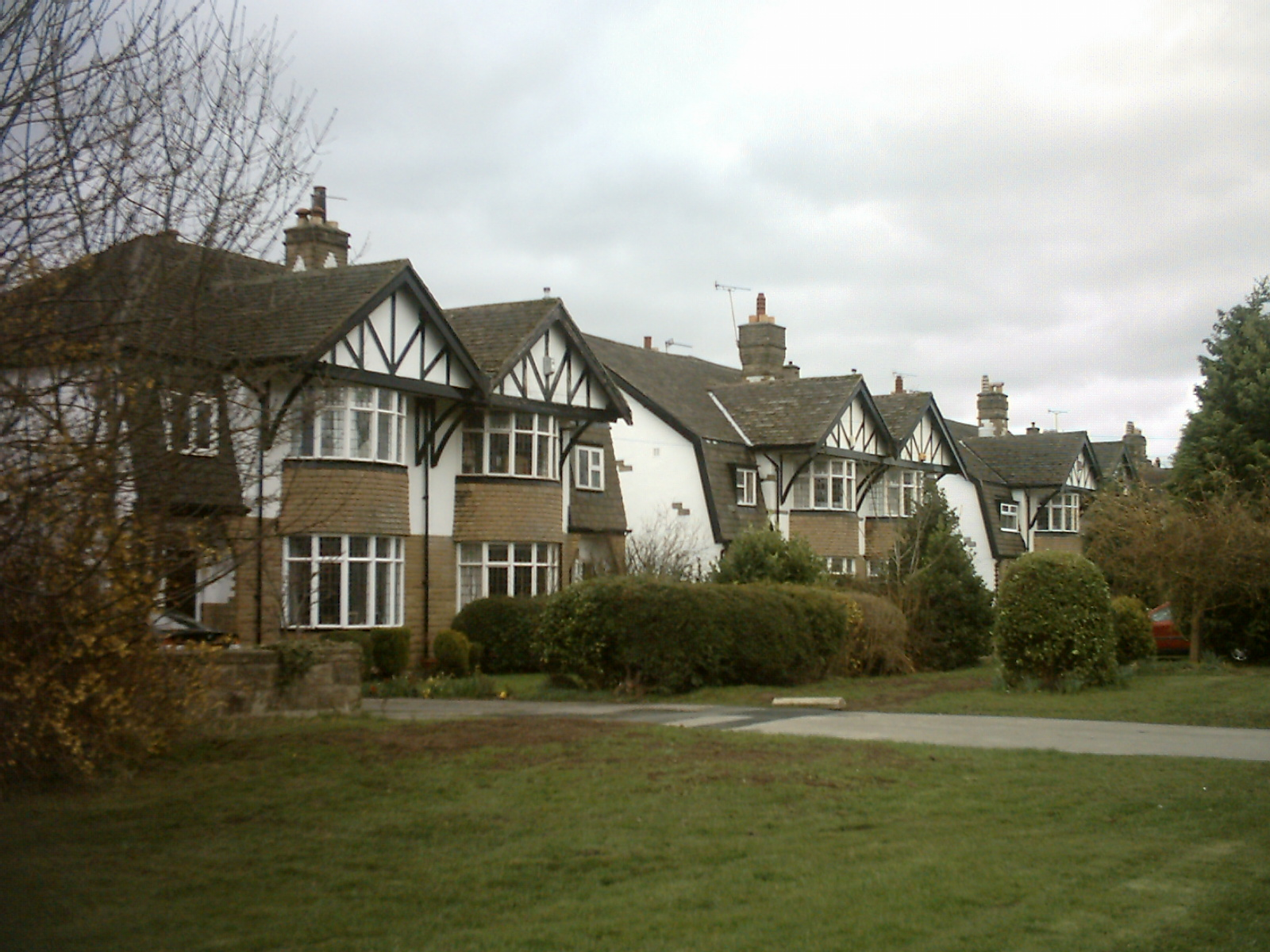
Private semi-detached houses in Lawnswood

Most of the houses in Lawnswood are large private detached and semi detached suburban houses. Houses in the area fetch amongst the highest prices in the City of Leeds along with neighbouring Adel, Alwoodley, Roundhay, Scarcroft and Boston Spa. Besides these large houses there are many 1930s flats in Lawnswood, built in the style of semi-detached houses, each block contains four flats, each with a private entrance, these are a good example of architecture of their time and while there are examples of similar houses in Moortown, Lawnswood has a great number of them.

== Amenities ==
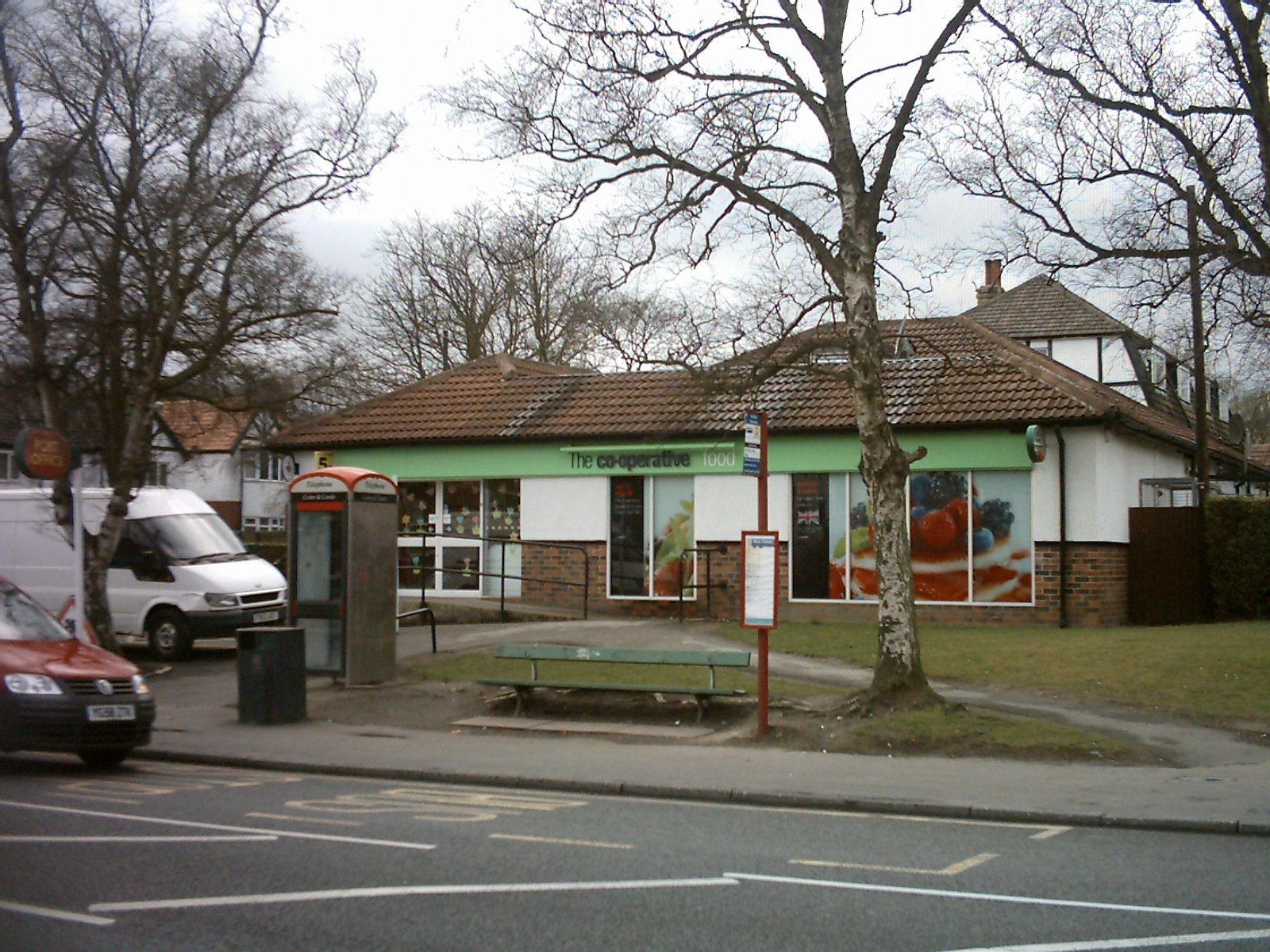
Lawnswood Co-op and Post Office

Lawnswood has most of its amenities on the western side of Otley Road. Lawnswood School lies on the Leeds Outer Ring Road. Along Otley Road there are several shops, including a Co-op, a post office (named 'Adel Post Office'), several banks as well as hairdressers, estate agents, delicatessens and other independent retailers. Towards the top end of Lawnswood is the Lawnswood Arms, a large detached public house, whilst on the opposite side of Otley Road there is an Esso Petrol Station.

== Sport ==
=== Support ===
Lawnswood is within walking distance of Headingley Stadium and so many of the residents are supporters of the Leeds Rhinos rugby league club, the Leeds Tykes rugby union club and the Yorkshire County Cricket Club, all based at the stadium.

In terms of football, most people in Lawnswood support the city's major football club, Leeds United.

=== Participation ===
The City of Leeds Lawnswood YMCA provides facilities for aerobics, football, rugby league, rugby union and many other competitive sports.

== Lawnswood Cemetery ==
Lawnswood has one of the city's main cemeteries and crematoria. Lawnswood Cemetery was opened in 1875, its grounds and most of its buildings designed by architect George Corson, who was himself buried here in 1910. The crematorium, first in Leeds, was opened in 1905. In 1911 Ethel Preston was buried here, her elaborate memorial is a grade II listed building.

The cemetery contains the war graves of 138 Commonwealth service personnel of the First World War and 67 of the Second World War, besides a screen wall memorial listing 105 service personnel buried in the closed Leeds General Cemetery whose graves could no longer be maintained. The crematorium has a memorial erected within the columbarium central hall by the Commonwealth War Graves Commission (CWGC) to 94 service personnel cremated here during the Second World War. Three soldier recipients of the Victoria Cross were also cremated here:

- Colonel Richard Kirby Ridgeway (1848–1924) (earned in Naga Hills Expedition)
- Lieutenant-Colonel Harry Daniels (1884–1953) (First World War)
- Sergeant Albert Mountain (1895–1967) (First World War)

Buried here is the computing pioneer and entrepreneur Dora Metcalf (1892–1982). Also buried here is Second Lieutenant Anthony Moorhouse (1935–1956), whose kidnap and murder following the ceasefire in Suez formed the diplomatic row known as the Moorhouse Affair.

== Local employment ==
The Department for Work and Pensions, (DWP), has a cluster of buildings in Lawnswood dealing with Disabilities and Carers.

== Notable Lawnswoodians ==
Playwright Alan Bennett and BBC television presenter John Craven attended Leeds Modern School, now known as Lawnswood School (slogan "a truly comprehensive school".)

== See also ==
- Bodington Hall
- Lawnswood School
- Listed buildings in Leeds (Adel and Wharfedale Ward)
- Otley Run
