= St John the Baptist Church, Adel =

Church in Leeds, West Yorkshire, England

St John the Baptist Church
- Parish Church of St John the Baptist, Adel
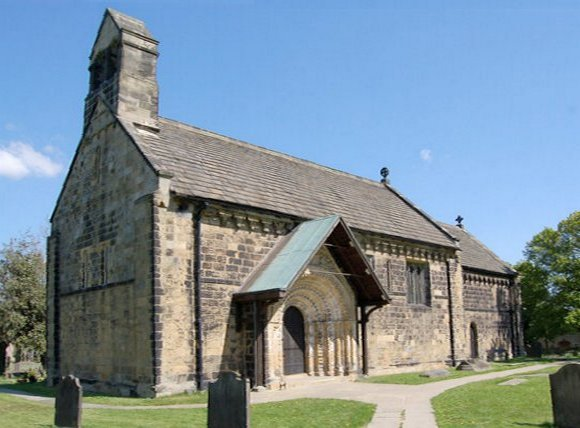
- St John the Baptist Church
- 53°51′27″N 1°35′02″W
- OS grid reference: SE 27462 40235
- Location: Adel, Leeds, West Yorkshire
- Country: England
- Denomination: Church of England
- Website: www.adelstjohnchurch.org.uk

History
- Status: Parish church

Architecture
- Heritage designation: Grade I listed building
- Architectural type: Romanesque

Specifications
- Materials: Gritstone with stone slate roof

Administration
- Province: York
- Diocese: Leeds
- Archdeaconry: Leeds
- Deanery: Headingley
- Parish: Adel

The Grade I listed, mainly Norman Church of Saint John the Baptist in Adel, Leeds, West Yorkshire, England has been described by Nicholas Pevsner as 'one of the best and most complete Norman churches in Yorkshire'. It is most notable for its magnificent south doorway with surrounding carvings, and highly carved Norman chancel arch. There is also a replica of a 13th-century sanctuary ring on the exterior of the south door, the original having unfortunately been stolen in 2002. The church is an active Anglican parish church in the archdeaconry of Leeds and the Diocese of Leeds.

== History ==
The church is of Norman origin having been built between 1150 and 1170. Alterations were made in the 14th and 16th centuries. The west gable and bellcote were built between 1838 and 1839 by R. D. Chantrell, who also restored the chancel roof in 1843, while the nave roof was restored in 1879. The paternal grandparents of Catherine, Princess of Wales married at Adel Church in December 1946.

The church was Grade I listed on 26 September 1963; the sundial, a mounting block and several memorials are Grade II listed.

== Architecture ==
=== Exterior ===
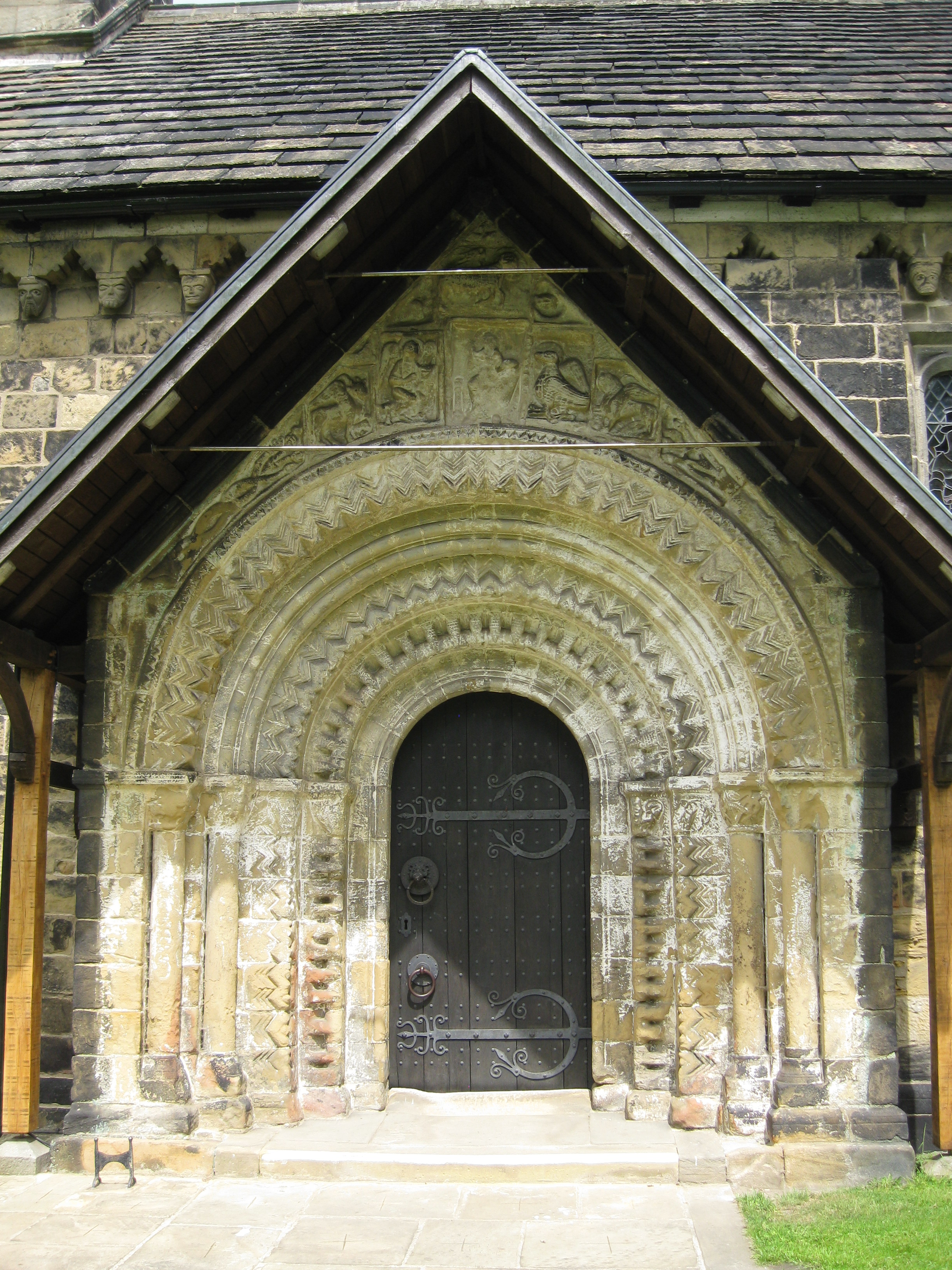
The Norman south doorway

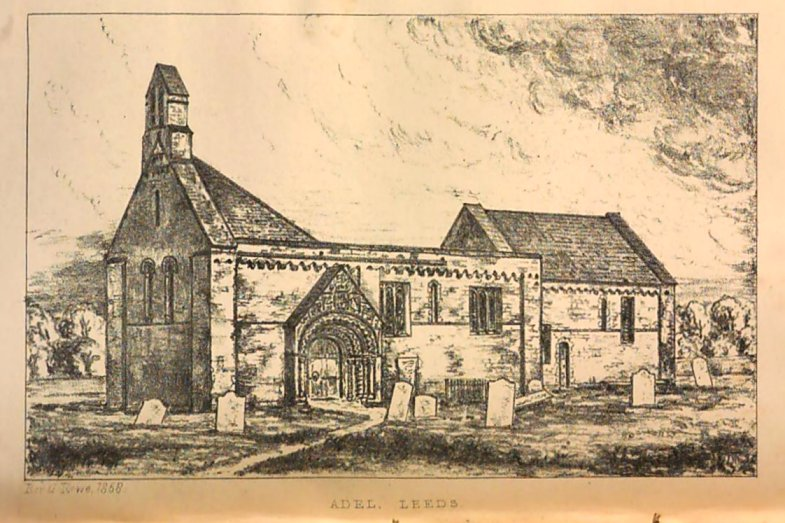
Adel church, 1868, showing its appearance after the restoration of the original roofline of the chancel but before that of the nave - from a drawing by Rev G Rowe

The small two-cell church has a nave and chancel with a lower roof. The roofline was lowered in the medieval period (since restored) and some larger windows inserted (several since removed), but otherwise it is a remarkably intact survival from the Norman period without additions of later aisle or transepts, the only substantial later structures being a 19th-century belfry, plus a vestry on the north side of the chancel. Its most notable external feature is a magnificent Norman doorway on the south side with four or more levels of elaborately carved arches. In the gable are weathered relief of Christ in majesty and several symbols including the lamb and flag, the cross and the sun and moon. The boarded door had iron studs and a 13th-century bronze sanctuary ring (door knocker) depicting a monster swallowing a man that was replaced by a replica after the original was stolen in 2002. The church has small Norman round windows and a flat-headed 14th-century decorated window in the nave; a further such window in the chancel was removed in the 1879 restoration and its appearance returned to the original Norman style. The south wall of the chancel has a small priests' doorway. The vestry is connected by a short passage to the north-west side of the church with an arched doorway and trefoil window, while the vestry has a three-light east window. The three small, Norman-style windows in the east end wall of the chancel were re-inserted in the nineteenth century, having previously been blocked up and partly replaced by a single window in the decorated style dating from 1681, as illustrated here. The north and south walls are decorated with 81 corbels and the chancel arch has 37 grotesque beakheads. The bellcote dates from 1839.

=== Interior ===
The chancel arch dates from 1160 to 1170, its carved capitals show the baptism of Christ, the crucifixion, a centaur with bow and a horseman with lance. The octagonal font at the west end is possibly the original having been found in the churchyard in 1859. A carved oak canopy by Eric Gill from 1921 depicts the crucifixion, six of the sacraments and a Christian arriving in heaven. The oak pulpit with panels carved in linenfold style was presented by EW Beckett of Kirkstall Grange in memory of his wife who died in 1891. The stained glass is by Henry Gyles of York.

== Organisation ==
The church hall is in the old stables. St John the Baptist Church of England Primary School is on Long Causeway.

== Gallery ==
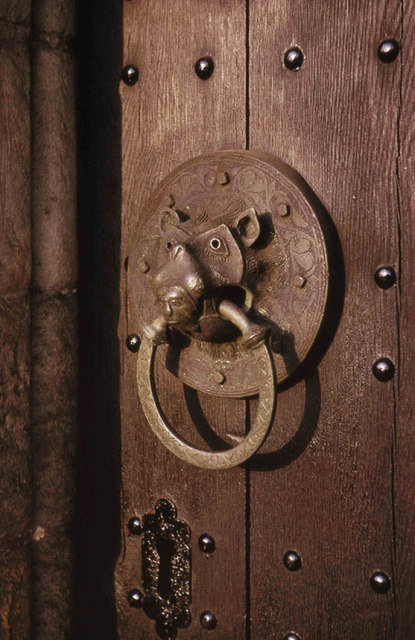
The original Norman door ring in 1963.

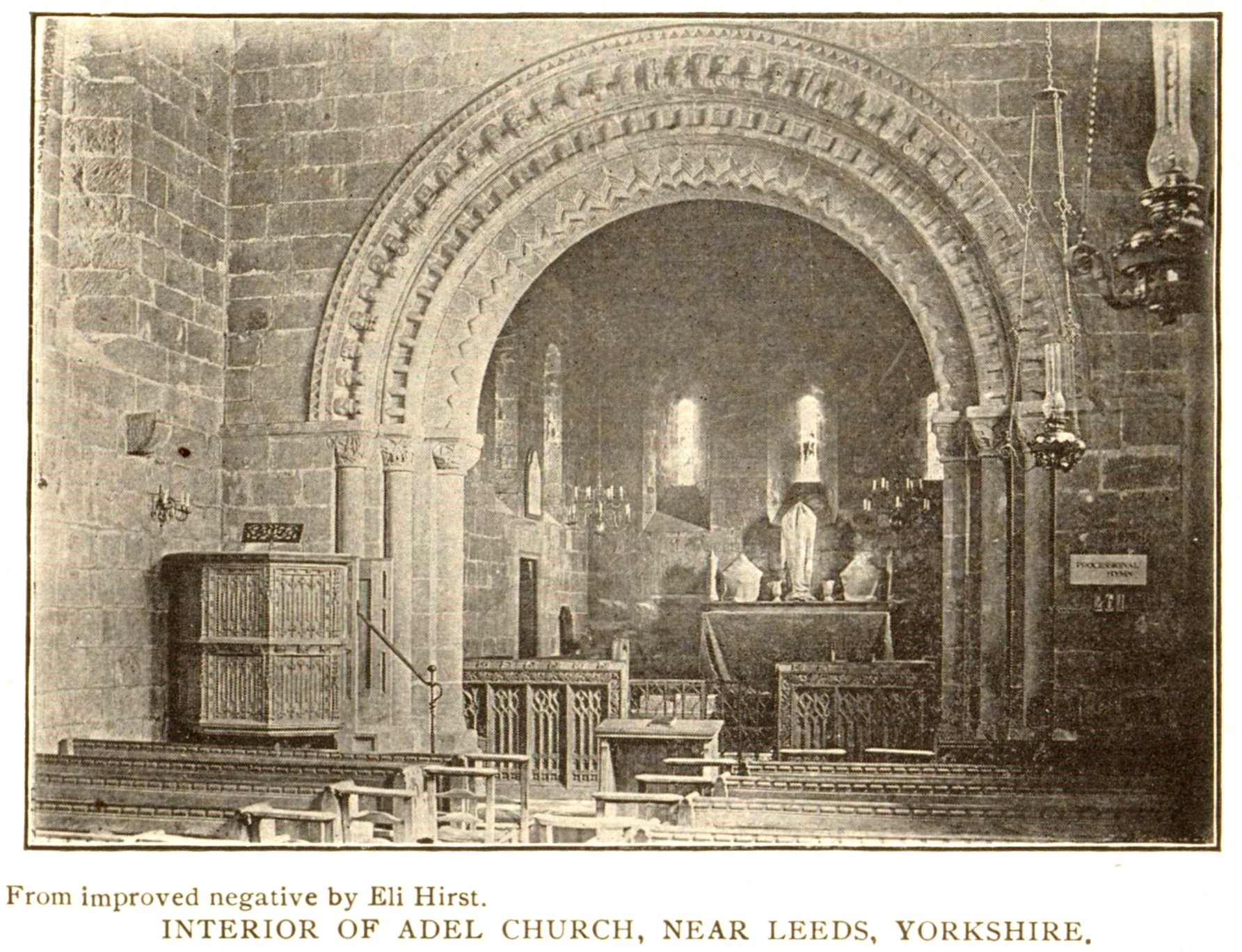
Interior showing the very fine Norman chancel arch, photographed ca. 1890

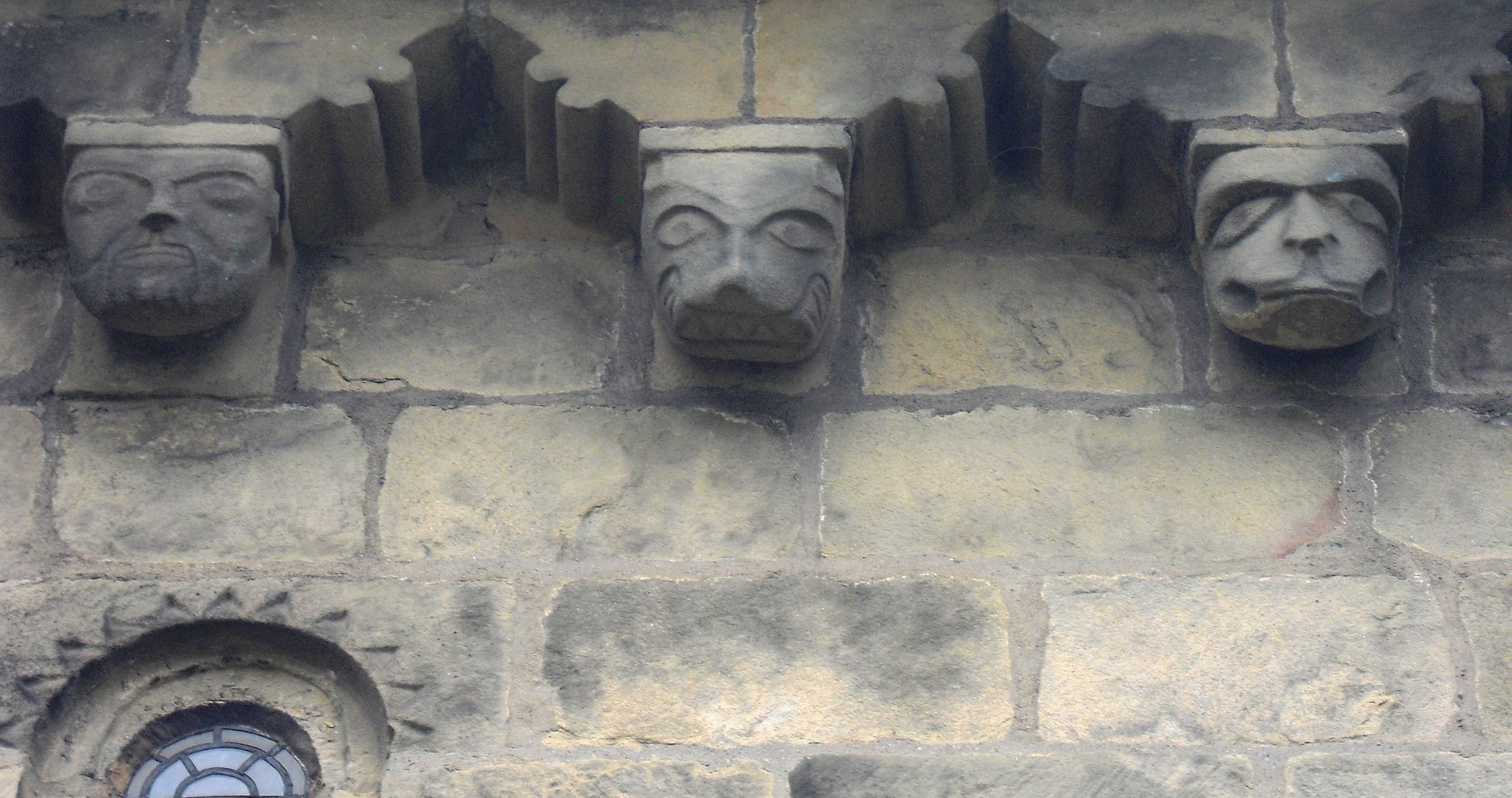
The corbel frieze and round Romanesque window

== See also ==
- List of places of worship in the City of Leeds
- Grade I listed buildings in West Yorkshire
- Listed buildings in Leeds (Adel and Wharfedale Ward)
