= Samuel Corson =

American psychiatrist (1909–1998)

- Born: Samuel Abraham Corson; 31 December 1909; Dobryanka, Russian Empire
- Died: 27 January 1998 (aged 88); Granger, Indiana, US
- Occupation: Physician
- Known for: Pet-facilitated psychotherapy
- Medical career
- Profession: Psychiatrist
- Institutions: Ohio State University
- Notable works: "Pet-facilitated Psychotherapy in a Hospital Setting"

Samuel Abraham Corson (31 December 1909 – 27 January 1998) was an American professor of psychiatry at Ohio State University who, with his wife Elizabeth, led early research into pet therapy, which contributed to dogs and other pets becoming commonplace in settings such as nursing homes.

His initial research involved applying Pavlovian techniques in the study of the effects of stress on dogs. Subsequently, by chance, Corson and his wife became interested in what they termed "pet-facilitated psychotherapy" when some adolescent patients with mental illness asked to meet the animals. They then extended pet facilitated therapy to the elderly. In 1975, Corson described the case of an elderly man who spoke for the first time in 26 years after being introduced to a dog named Whiskey.

== Early life and education ==
Samuel Corson was born on 31 December 1909 in Dobryanka, a small village 200 miles from Odessa, Russian Empire, and moved to Philadelphia in his teens. He had one sister. He gained a doctorate in biophysics at the University of Texas after studying physiology at New York University and the University of Pennsylvania.

== Career ==
In 1960, Corson was appointed professor of psychiatry and biophysics at Ohio State University, where, with his wife Elizabeth, he established a research laboratory. His initial research involved applying Pavlovian techniques in the study of the effects of stress on dogs. Their daughter Olivia later recounted that she was "traumatized by aspects of their early work".

Subsequently, by chance, Corson and his wife became interested in what they termed "pet-facilitated psychotherapy" when some adolescent patients in the hospital ward above the dogs' kennel asked to meet the animals. The dogs consisted of beagles, Border Collies, Wirehair Fox Terriers, a Labrador Retriever, and one German Shepherd-husky mix called Whiskey, whose aggressive affection attracted the attention of some adolescents who were overly energetic. The patients had previously not responded favorably to traditional treatments and following the introduction of pets all the studied cases had improved. Corson subsequently published several case studies of the interaction between dogs and those with mental illness. He believed the dogs had two particular attributes:

their ability to offer love and tactile reassurance without criticism and their maintenance of a sort of perpetual infantile innocent dependence that may stimulate our natural tendency to offer support and protection.

The Corsons then extended pet facilitated therapy to the elderly at the Castle Nursing Homes in Millersburg, Ohio. They demonstrated physical improvements in nursing home residents that exercised dogs. In 1975, he described the case of Jed, a withdrawn patient in his late 70s who was assumed to be deaf and had been mute for 26 years following a fall. Upon being introduced to 'Whiskey', Jed said "You brought that dog" and subsequently began to draw pictures of dogs.

Corson attributed the success of the therapy to his ability to match the temperament and behavioural traits of different breeds of dog to the needs of individual patients. For example, he observed that playful poodles and wire-haired fox terriers suited immobile and bedridden residents and those who were withdrawn or depressed.

Corson retired in 1980.

== Family and personal life ==
Corson had a son from his first marriage and two daughters from his second marriage to Elizabeth. He had one stepson.

== Death and legacy ==
Corson died in Granger, Indiana, on 27 January 1998. His work on pets in psychiatry contributed to dogs and other pets becoming commonplace in settings such as nursing homes.

== Selected publications ==
- Corson, S. A.; Corson, E. O.; Gwynne, P. H.; Arnold, L. E. (1975). "Pet-facilitated Psychotherapy in a Hospital Setting". Current Psychiatric Therapies. 15: 277–286. ISSN 0070-2080. PMID 1237389.
- Corson, Samuel A.; Arnold, L. Eugene; Gwynne, Peter H.; Corson, Elizabeth O'Leary (1 January 1977). "Pet Dogs as Nonverbal Communication Links in Hospital Psychiatry". Comprehensive Psychiatry. 18 (1): 61–72. doi:10.1016/S0010-440X(77)80008-4. ISSN 0010-440X. PMID 556686.
- Corson, S. A.; Corson, E. O. (1978). "Pets as Mediators of Therapy". Current Psychiatric Therapies. 18: 195–205. ISSN 0070-2080. PMID 572757.
- Corson, Samuel (2012). Psychiatry and Psychology in the USSR. Springer Science & Business Media. ISBN 978-1-4613-4298-4.
