= François Courson de la Villehelio =

French colonial administrator (1791–1830)

François Courson de la Villehelio was chief of Yanam in what is today India during French colonial rule.

De la Villehelio was born at Île-de-France in 1791. His parents were François-Thérès Courson de la Villehelio and Amélie Courson de la Villehelio (née de Kersauson du Vijac).

De la Villehelio was nominated by King Louis XVIII as Chief of Yanam on 21 July 1814. A royal decree dated 9 June 1824 relieved him of his duties. However his term ended on 19 April 1825. De la Villehelio remained in Yanam until his death on 28 May 1830.

In Yanam, the village Coursonpeta (now Kurasampeta) was named in De la Villehelio's honor.
