= George Corson =

Scottish architect (1829–1910)

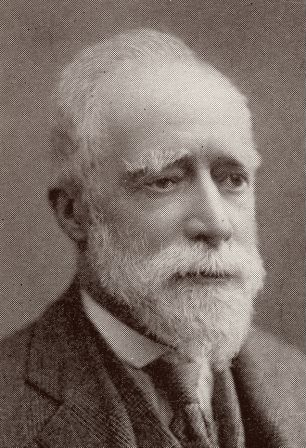
George Corson

George Corson (1829–1910) was a Scottish architect active in Leeds, West Yorkshire, England.

== Background ==
Corson was born in Dumfries, where he was articled to Walter Newall before moving to Leeds in 1849 to work with his brother William Reid Corson who was working there with Edward La Trobe Bateman. His brother left Leeds in 1860, leaving Corson in charge of the practice.

In Leeds, Corson was president of the Leeds and Yorkshire Architectural Association by 1898.

== Works ==
Corson was responsible for many buildings in Leeds including:

- the Grand Theatre (1877–78), with his assistant James Robinson Watson – Grade II* listed
- the municipal buildings (1878–84) – Grade II* listed, now housing the Leeds Central Library.

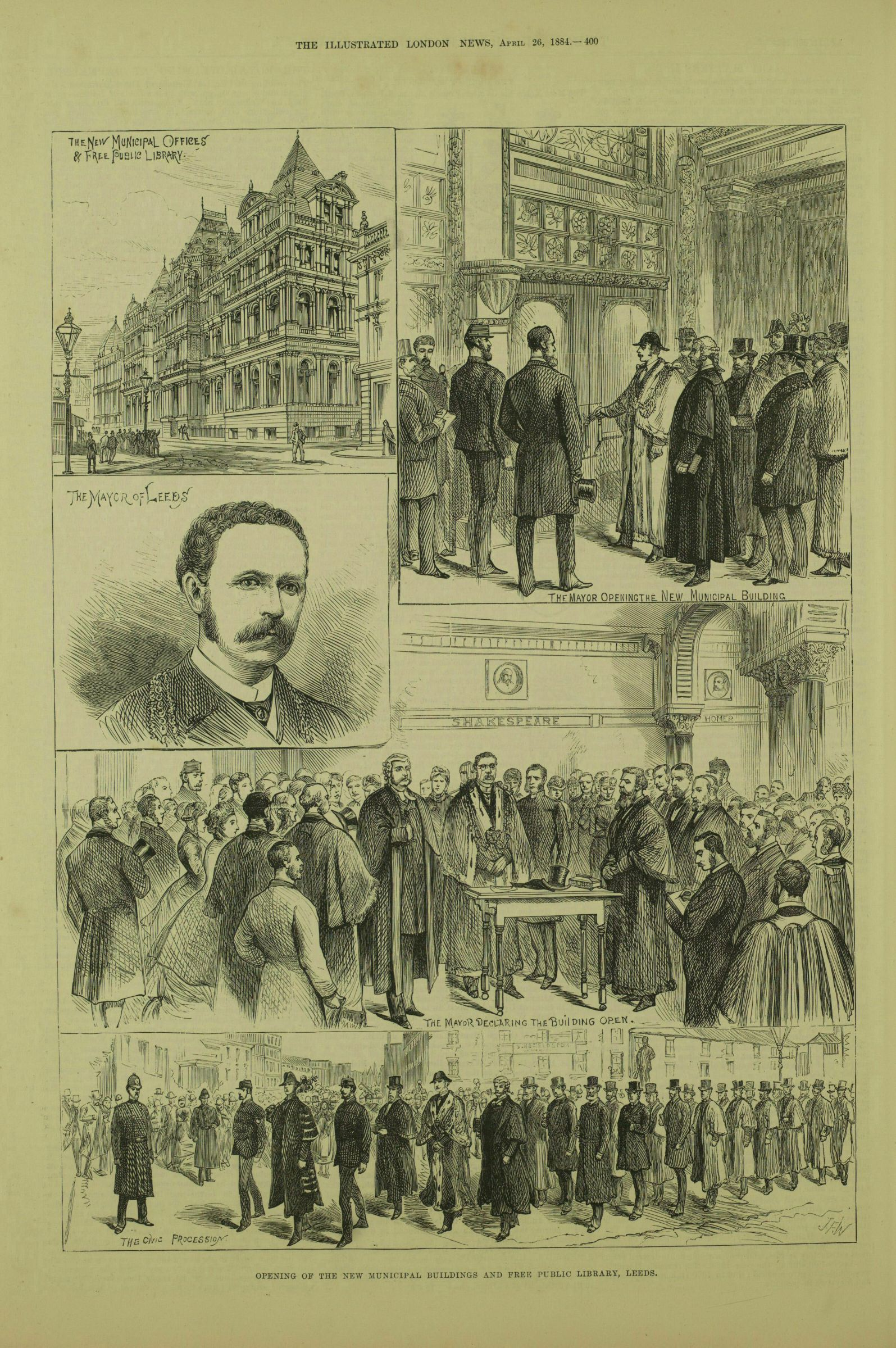
Opening of the New Municipal Buildings and Free Public Library, Leeds in 1884

- an extension (1891–92) to George Gilbert Scott's Grade I listed Leeds General Infirmary
- Apsley House (formerly Concourse House) (1903) – originally a drapers and haberdashery warehouse for Crowe & Co and now occupied by Sky Sports
- many large houses in Headingley including the Grade II* listed Spenfield
- St Edmund's Church, Roundhay, Leeds, designed 1873.
- Bewerley Street School, Bewerley Street, Dewsbury Road, Leeds, designed 1872.
- St Silas National School, Goodman Street, Hunslet, designed 1872.
- Additions and alterations to Ripon Grammar School, designed 1875.
- Leeds School of Medicine, Park Street, inaugurated 1865.
- the warehouse (1859) at the textile manufacturing premises of Francis Lupton in Wellington Street Leeds, the plans (June 1870) for the Lupton family's Newton Hall/Newton Park Estate in Potternewton, and the c. 1860 Victorian wing of the Lupton family's Beechwood Estate, Roundhay; known as Corson House.

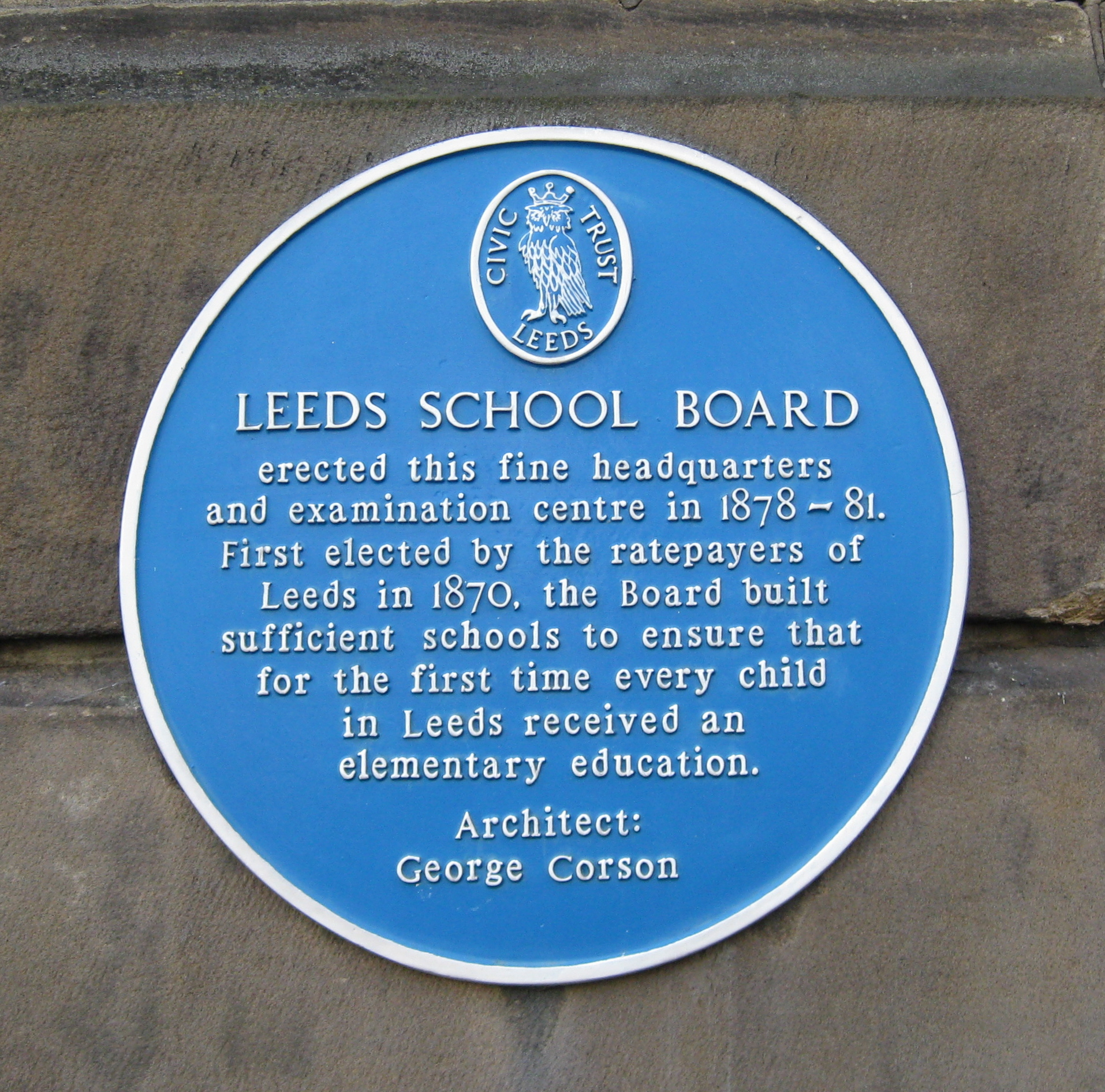
Leeds School Board Blue Plaque

== Roundhay Park and Lawnswood Cemetery ==
Corson won a competition for the landscaping of Roundhay Park in 1873, and in 1874 designed the layout and many of the buildings of Lawnswood cemetery, where he himself was buried in 1910. His gravestone, a Celtic cross with five bosses, is Grade II listed, one of only four listed memorials at Lawnswood.

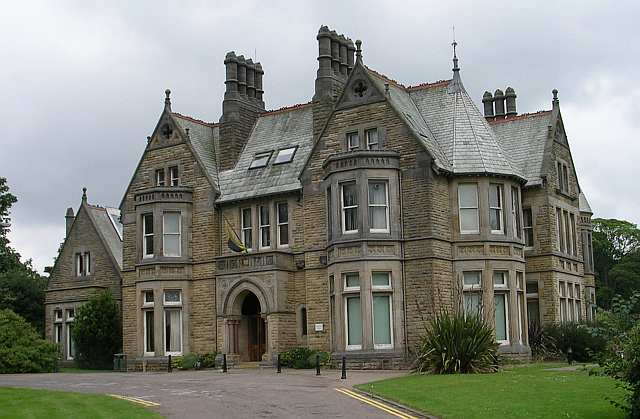
Spenfield House, 1875–77

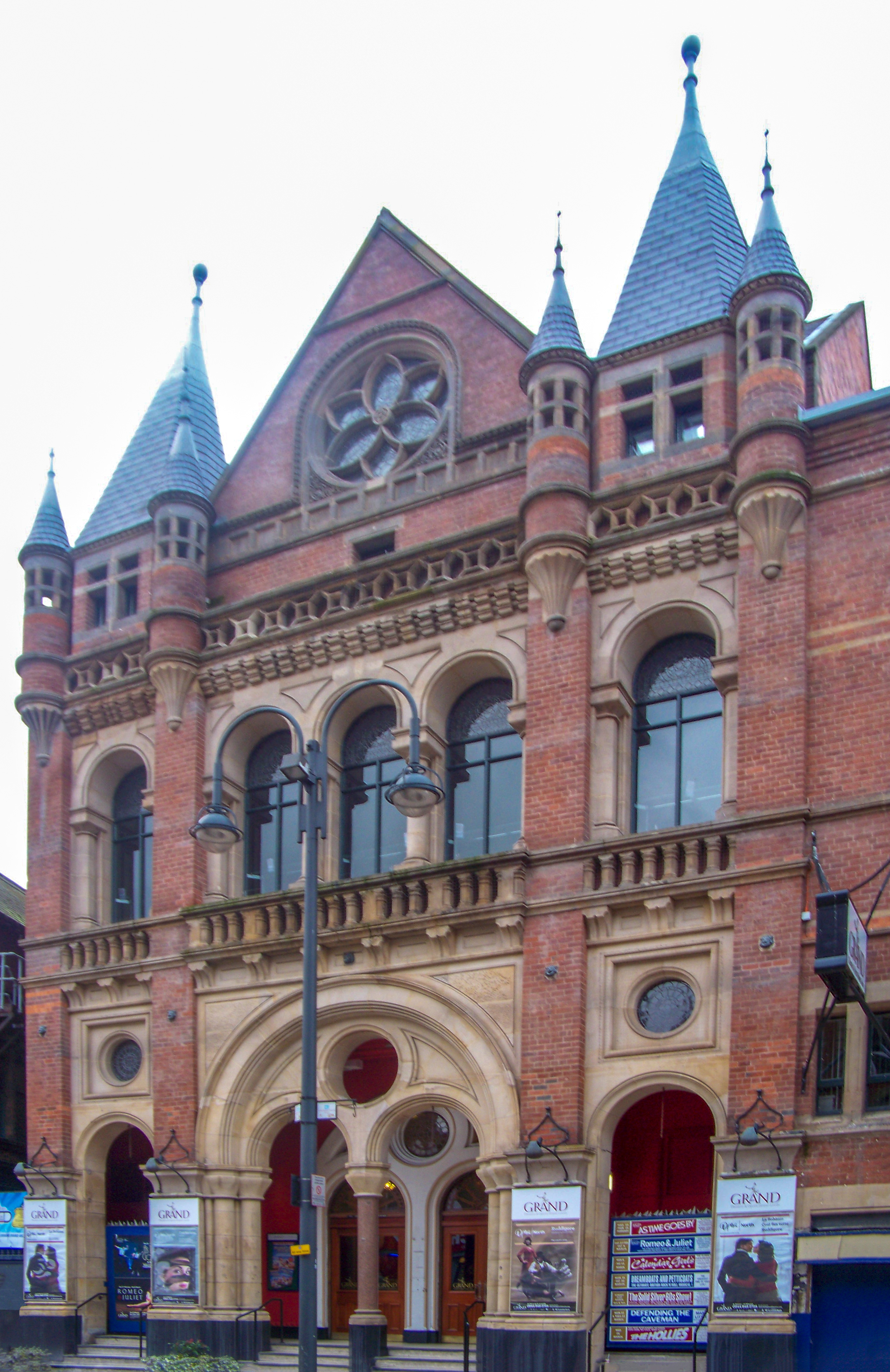
Leeds Grand Theatre
