= Helen Williams =

Helen Williams may refer to:

- Helen Williams (British civil servant) (born 1950)
- Helen Maria Williams (1759–1827), British novelist
- Helen Williams (Australian public servant) (born 1945), first woman appointed as Secretary of an Australian Government department
- Helen Williams (model) (1935–2023), American model
- Helen Williams (curler) (born 1973), Australian curler
- Helen Williams, character in Across the Plains
- Helen Williams, character in The Blue Veil

== See also ==
- Ellen Williams (disambiguation)
