= Listed buildings in Leeds =

There are over 3,300 listed buildings in City of Leeds district (a wider area than Leeds, which includes several other towns such as Otley and Morley). Lists of buildings in the upper two categories can be found at Grade I listed buildings in West Yorkshire (Leeds section) and Grade II* listed buildings in Leeds.

The listed buildings in Leeds are included in the following lists, divided by ward:

- Listed buildings in Leeds (Adel and Wharfedale Ward)
- Listed buildings in Leeds (Alwoodley) (Note: This list includes the listed buildings in the ward and the civil parish of Alwoodley.)
- Listed buildings in Leeds (Ardsley and Robin Hood Ward)
- Listed buildings in Leeds (Armley Ward)
- Listed buildings in Leeds (Beeston and Holbeck Ward)
- Listed buildings in Leeds (Bramley and Stanningley Ward)
- Listed buildings in Leeds (Burmantofts and Richmond Hill Ward)
- Listed buildings in Leeds (Chapel Allerton Ward)
- Listed buildings in Leeds (City and Hunslet Ward - northern area)
- Listed buildings in Leeds (City and Hunslet Ward - southern area)
- Listed buildings in Leeds (Cross Gates and Whinmoor Ward)
- Listed buildings in Leeds (Farnley and Wortley Ward)
- Listed buildings in Leeds (Gipton and Harehills Ward)
- Listed buildings in Leeds (Headingley Ward)
- Listed buildings in Leeds (Horsforth) (Note: This list includes the listed buildings in the ward and the civil parish of Horsforth.)
- Listed buildings in Leeds (Hyde Park and Woodhouse)
- Listed buildings in Leeds (Kirkstall Ward)
- Listed buildings in Leeds (Middleton Park Ward)
- Listed buildings in Leeds (Moortown Ward)
- Listed buildings in Leeds (Roundhay Ward)
- Listed buildings in Leeds (Temple Newsam Ward)
- Listed buildings in Leeds (Weetwood Ward)
