= Eccup =

Village in West Yorkshire, England

Coordinates: 53.876°N 1.565°W

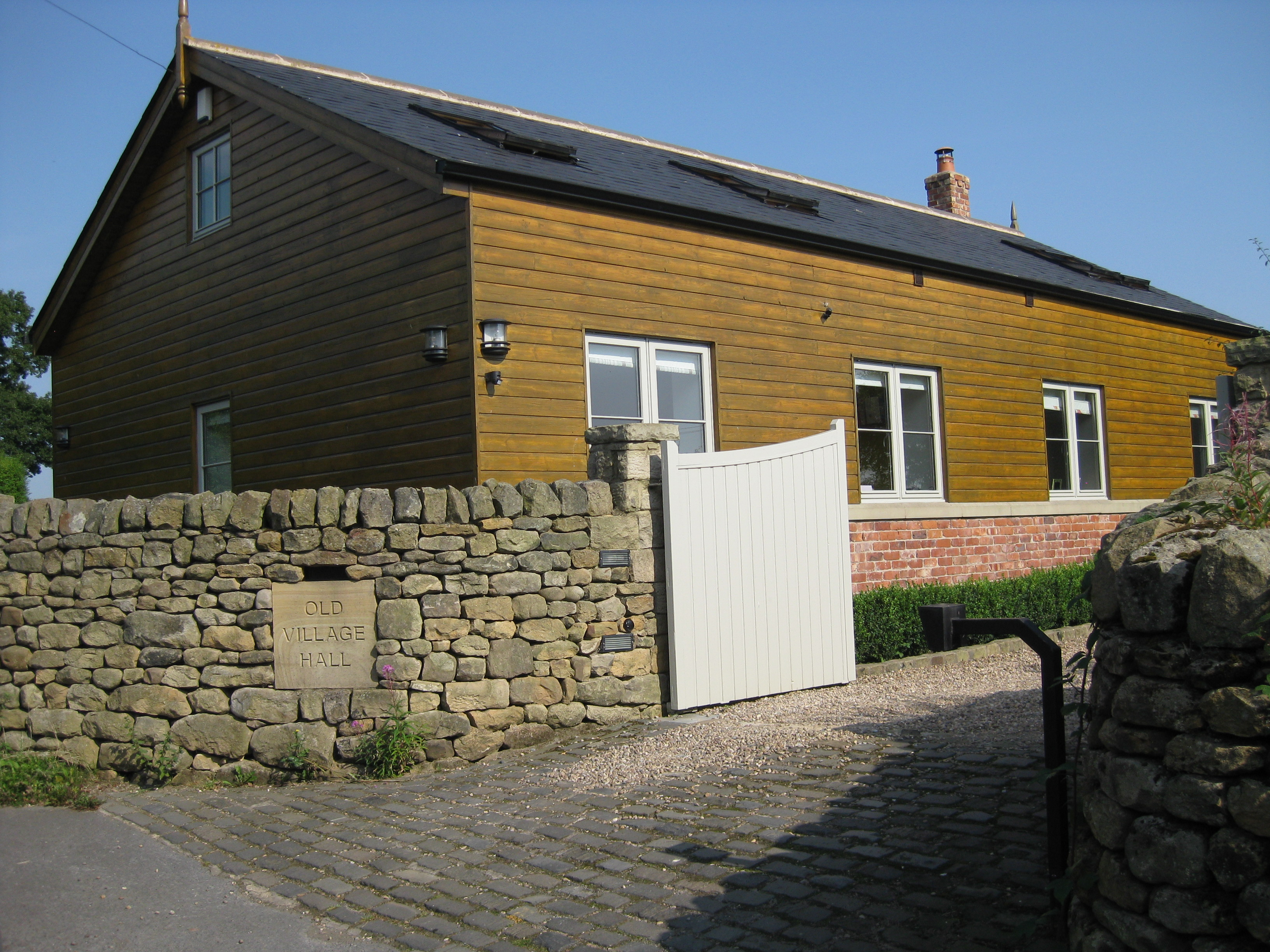
- Old Village Hall, Eccup

- Location within West Yorkshire
- OS grid reference: SE2842
- Civil parish: Alwoodley
- Metropolitan borough: City of Leeds
- Metropolitan county: West Yorkshire
- Region: Yorkshire and the Humber
- Country: England
- Sovereign state: United Kingdom
- Post town: LEEDS
- Postcode district: LS16
- Dialling code: 0113
- Police: West Yorkshire
- Fire: West Yorkshire
- Ambulance: Yorkshire
- UK Parliament: Leeds North East

Eccup is a village in the parish of Alwoodley and north of the City of Leeds, West Yorkshire, England. It is just north of Alwoodley and east of Bramhope and Golden Acre Park. Eccup is at the north-west edge of Eccup Reservoir. On 1 April 1926 Eccup became a civil parish, being formed from part of Adel cum Eccup, on 1 April 1928 the parish was abolished and merged with Leeds.

== Etymology ==
The place-name Eccup is first attested in the Domesday Book of 1086 as Echope. It is thought to derive from an Old English personal name Ecca + hōp 'enclosed land amid unpromising land; a small, enclosed valley'. It would therefore mean something like 'Ecca's patch of good land'. The name is referred to as Ecop in the Coucher Book of Kirkstall Abbey. From the sixteenth century the area up to the River Wharfe was known as Adel cum Eccup. Adel is about 2 miles south-west of Eccup.

Burden Head Farm, just to the north of the village, is also first attested in the Domesday book, as Burgedurun and Burgheduru’. It is thought to come from the Old English words burg ('fortified place') and dūn; thus it once meant 'hill of the fortification'.

== Geography ==
Kelly's Directory of the West Riding of Yorkshire (1881) refers to a Methodist (Wesleyan) chapel in Eccup.

== Use in Emmerdale ==
Eccup and The New Inn public house at the north of the village are location settings for the soap Emmerdale. Brookland Farm, a working farm to the south of the pub, is used for external shots of Butlers Farm, and Creskeld Hall, north-west in Arthington, for Home Farm. However, most of the soap is filmed in a specially built village in the neighbouring parish of Harewood to the north-east.

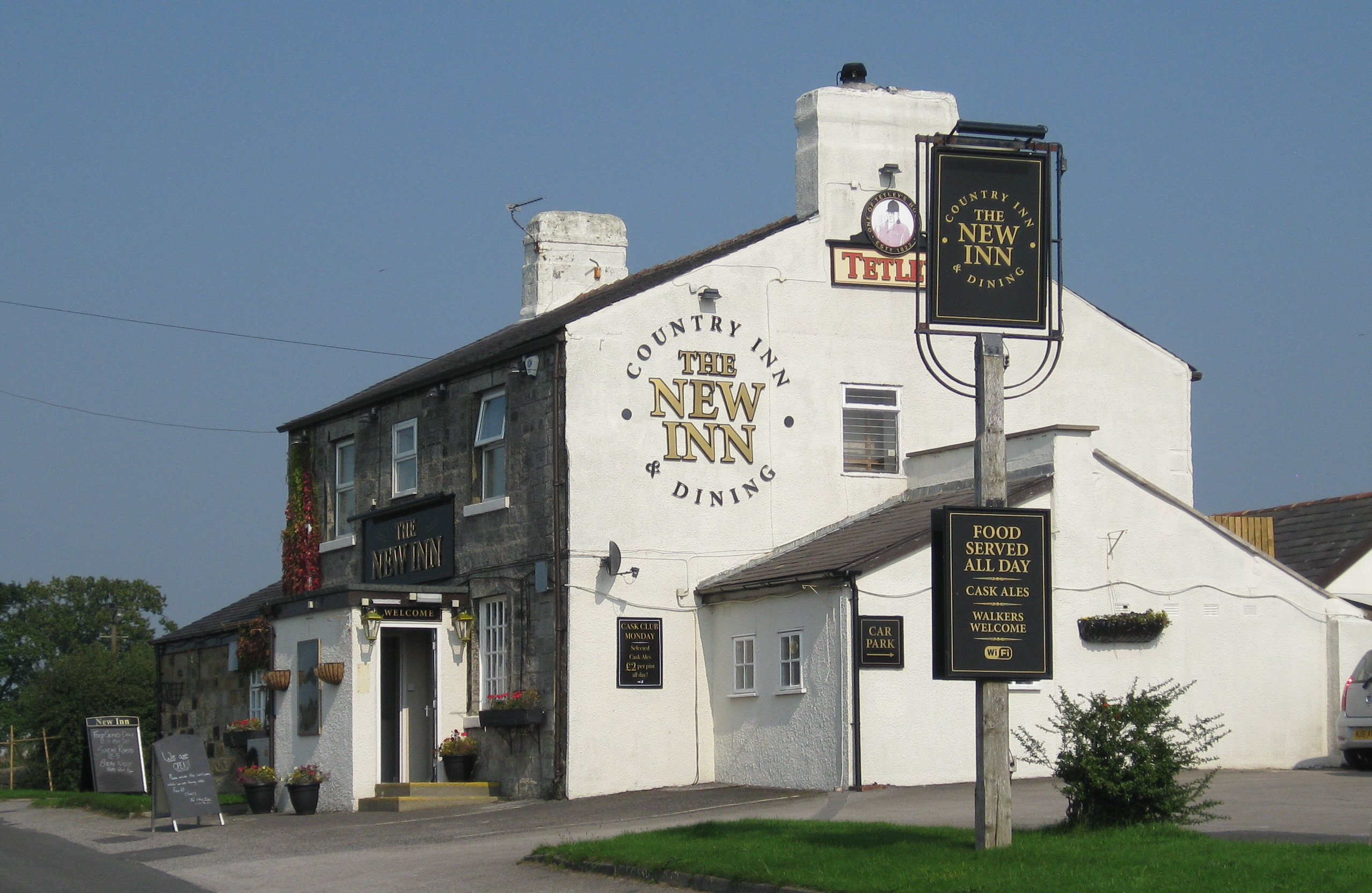
New Inn

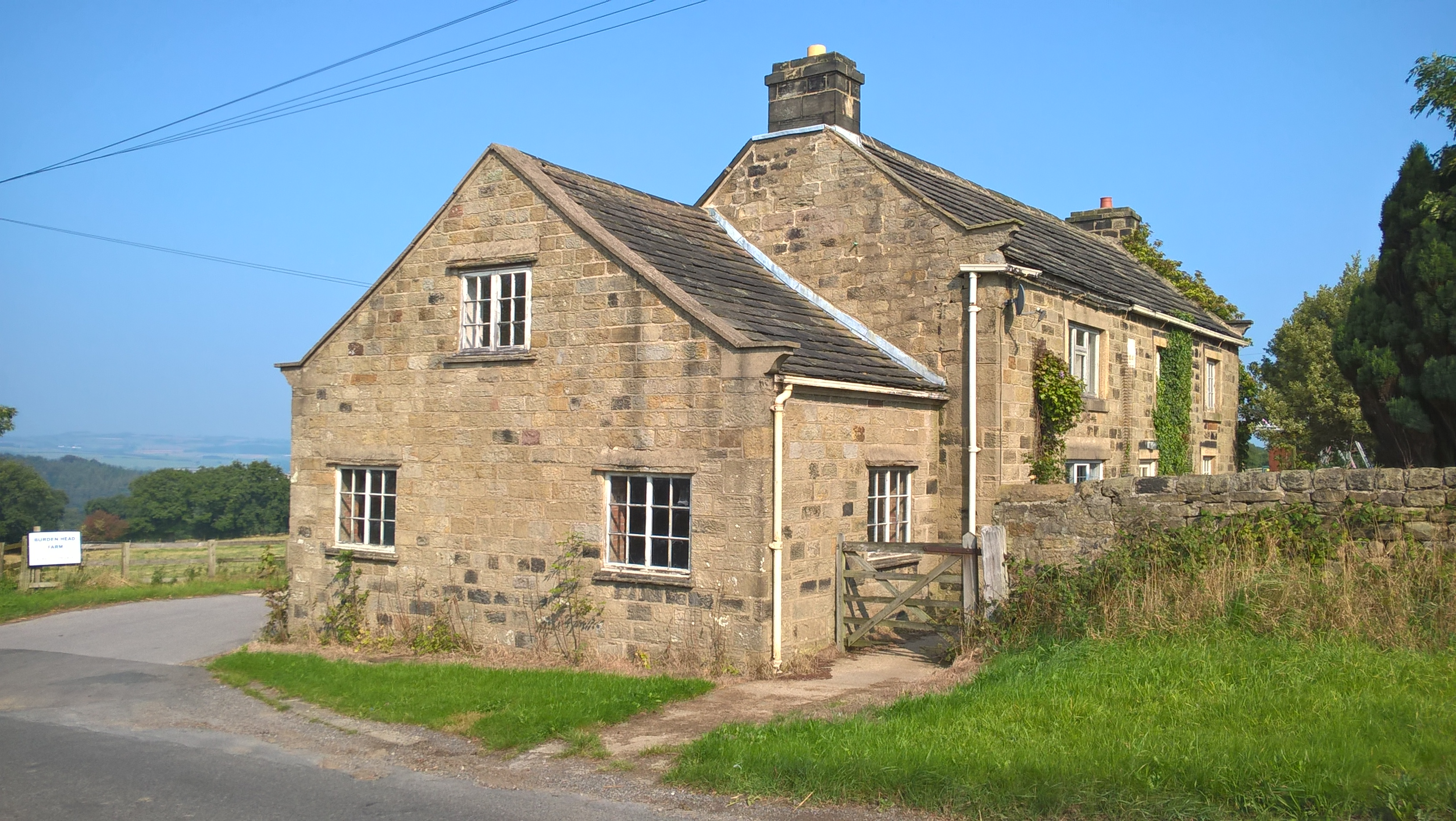
Burden Head Farm

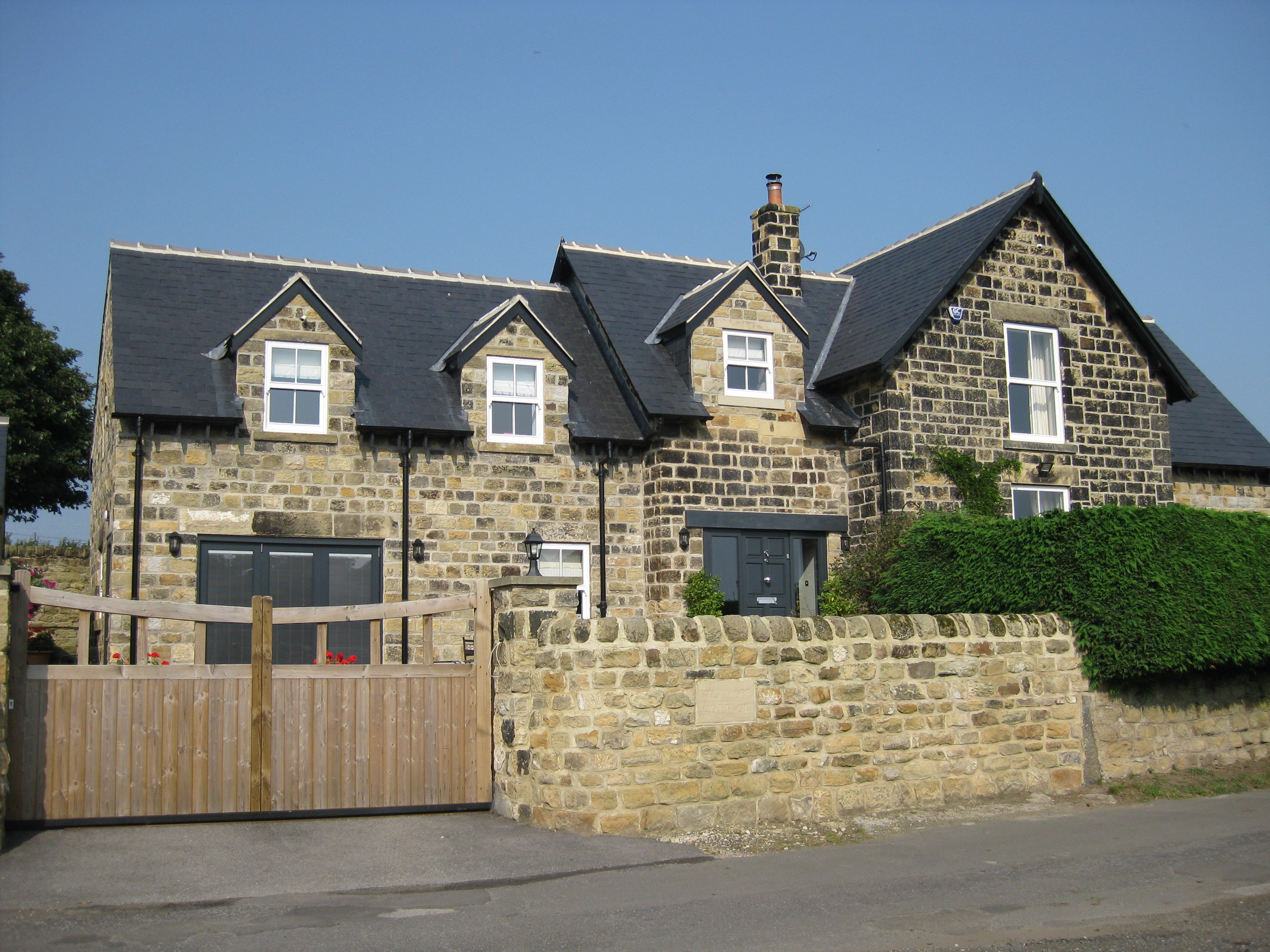
Sycamore Cottage

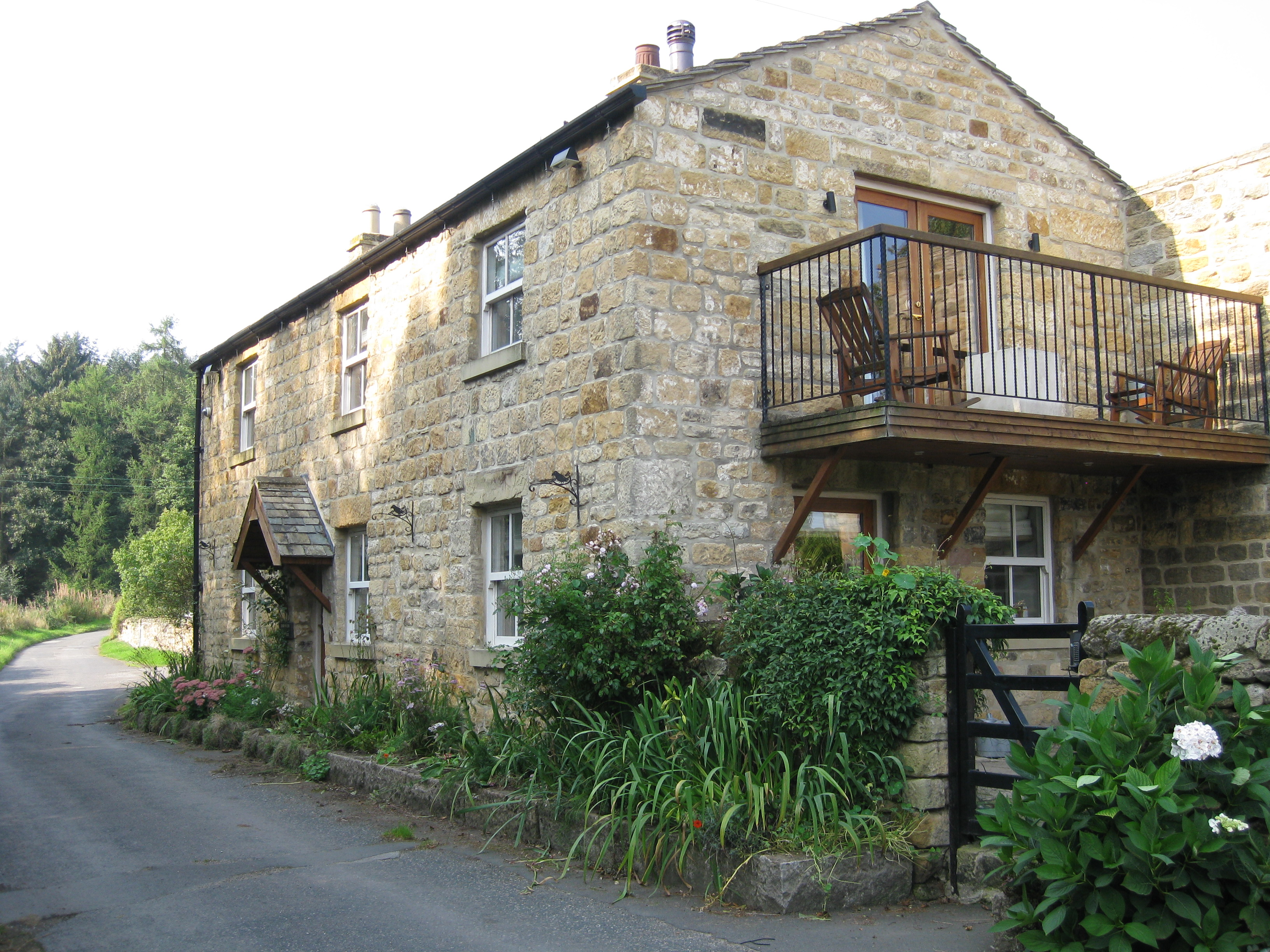
Thornbush Cottage

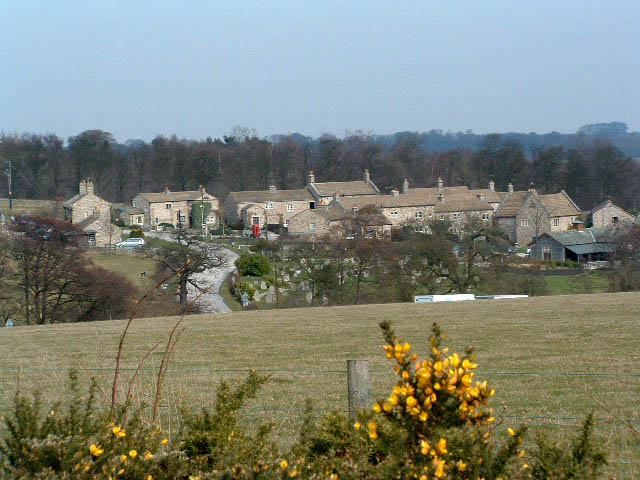
Emmerdale Village set
