= Ellen Williams =

Ellen Williams may refer to:

- Ellen D. Williams (born 1972), American actress
- Ellen D. Williams (scientist) (born 1953), American scientist
- Ellen Williams (luger) (born 1947), American luger
- Ellen Williams, last speaker of the Southern Lushootseed

== See also ==
- Helen Williams (disambiguation)
