= Eccup Reservoir =

Reservoir in West Yorkshire, England

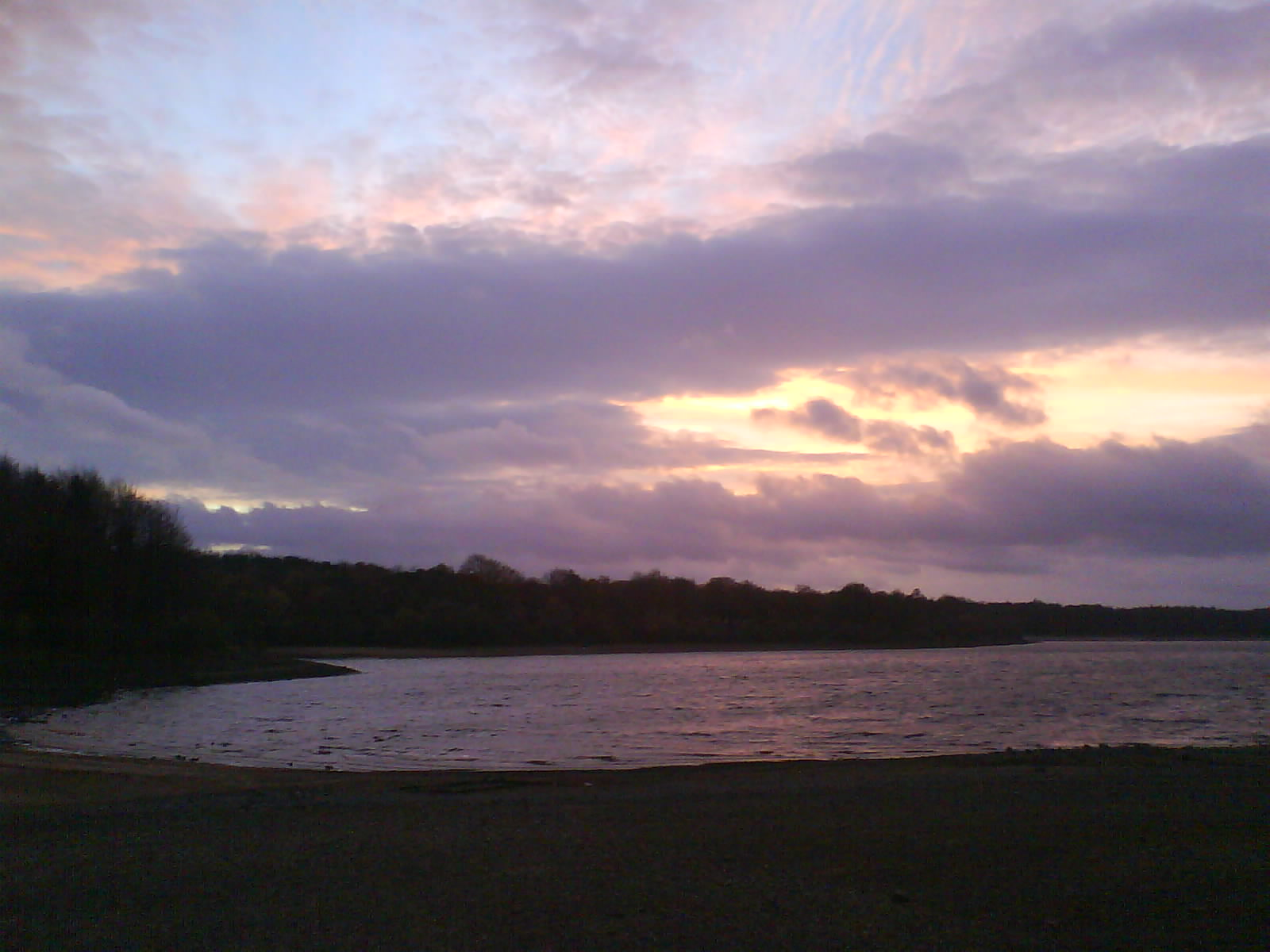
- Eccup Reservoir at sunset

- Location within Leeds
- Location: Alwoodley, Leeds, West Yorkshire
- Coordinates: 53°52′08″N 1°32′36″W
- Type: Reservoir
- Basin countries: United Kingdom
- Managing agency: Yorkshire Water
- Designation: SSSI
- Surface area: 91 ha (220 acres)

Eccup Reservoir is a reservoir in Alwoodley, a suburb of Leeds, West Yorkshire, England, near the village of Eccup. It was first constructed in 1843, and expanded to its present size in 1897. The open water area is 91 hectares (220 acres), making it the largest area of water in West Yorkshire. It receives water from several smaller reservoirs and from the River Ouse. The reservoir is owned by Yorkshire Water.

The reservoir and the surrounding woodlands are both Sites of Special Scientific Interest. The western end of the reservoir is the most vegetated. Fringing vegetation includes shore-weed (Littorella uniflora) and amphibious bistort (Persicaria amphibia), and such sedges as bottle sedge (Carex rostrata) and bladder sedge (Carex vesicaria), as well as taller stands of bulrush (Typha latifolia) and common spike-rush (Eleocharis palustris). Bladder sedge is rare in the county, only having been recorded at two other sites. The reservoir is now home to a growing population of red kites.

The reservoir is visited by large numbers of migrating and overwintering wading birds and waterfowl. The most significant of these is the goosander, with up to 2% of the British population overwintering here. Others include wigeon, teal, pochard, shelduck, shoveler, ruddy duck, goldeneye, greylag goose, dunlin and green sandpiper, while mallard and tufted duck are present all year round, as are curlew, redshank and common sandpiper.

There are 25 geocaches around Eccup Reservoir, making it a popular place with walkers. A circular walk of about 5 mi (8 km) around the reservoir is possible.
