= Adel, Leeds =

Suburb of Leeds in West Yorkshire, England

Coordinates: 53.8489°N 1.5849°W

Adel
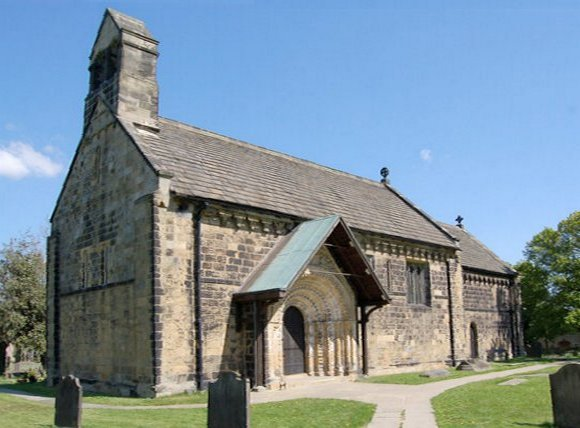
- Adel Church

- Location within West Yorkshire
- Population: 19,430 (ward. Adel and Wharfedale)
- Metropolitan borough: City of Leeds
- Metropolitan county: West Yorkshire
- Region: Yorkshire and the Humber
- Country: England
- Sovereign state: United Kingdom
- Post town: LEEDS
- Postcode district: LS16
- Dialling code: 0113
- Police: West Yorkshire
- Fire: West Yorkshire
- Ambulance: Yorkshire
- UK Parliament: Leeds North West

Adel (/ˈædl/ ADD-əl) is a suburb of Leeds, West Yorkshire, England. To its immediate south is Weetwood, to the west are Cookridge and Holt Park, to the east are Alwoodley and Moortown, and to the north are Bramhope, Arthington and Eccup.

It forms part of the Leeds City Council ward of Adel & Wharfedale and the parliamentary constituency of Leeds North West.

In common with many areas of Leeds it is not easy to define the boundaries of Adel, but Adel Church and the two schools are well to the east of Otley Road, the A660, although the post office is on that road.

== History ==
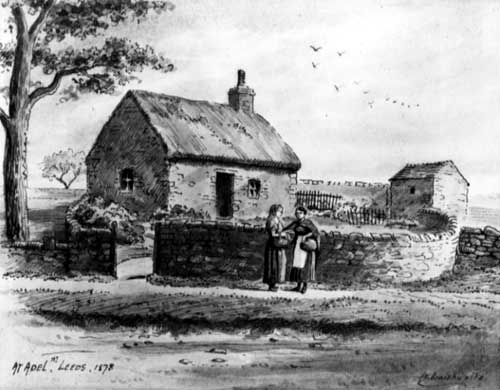
Drawing of Adel by W. Braithwaite in 1878.

Adel is situated near the site of a Roman fort, the ancient road from Tadcaster to Ilkley passing nearby. (The footpath by the side of Long Causeway was said to be made from the original Roman stones, until they were removed by the council in the 1960s because they were unsafe. Some of the footpath has been replaced, starting at the junction between Long Causeway and Stairfoot Lane, and continuing up to the entrance of Bedquilts playing fields.) Several inscribed stones from the Romano-British period were discovered in Adel, also a number of Anglo-Saxon stones were discovered in the church foundations during restoration work in 1864. Some of these items are on display in the Leeds City Museum, Cookridge Street. Among the foundation stones of Roman buildings found near Eccup Moor in 1702 were two altars, inscribed PIENTISSIMA, and D.M.S. CANDIDINAE, FORTUNA PIA V.A.X. respectively. Several large urns were also found there. On the side of the 'hill of Ada,' an altar dedicated to Brigantia DEAE BRIGANTIAE DONUM CINGE/ TISSA POSUIT, along with some statues and coins were later found. In 1849, a stone coffin was found on Addle Mill Farm.

The Roman name for the area is long thought to have been Burgodunum, but the Yorkshire Archaeological Society argues that this is "dubious". An alternative name is also Burgodurum, meaning the Fort by the Waterway. It has also been suggested that this was shortened to Burden, which is similar in sound to the Celtic Verdun, found in Belgium. It is probable that an Angle village sprang up around the fort and that a church was built in the village. Adel is mentioned in the 1086 Domesday Book as Adele. Another spelling used until 1816 is Addle. Most recent authorities derive the name from the Old English adela ‘dirty, muddy place’, but arguments have also been made for a personal name Ada (or similar Anglo-Saxon names such as Eadda, Eada or Ædda) + Old English lēah 'open ground, lea' (compare the terminus spelling of nearby Headingley DB: Hedingelei & hedingeleia).

The parish of Adel stretched to the River Wharfe in the north and included Adel, Arthington, Breary, Cookridge and Eccup. In 1831 the parish had a population of 1063. In 1866 the parish was abolished.

In 1152, the nearby Cistercian abbey at Kirkstall was founded. At the same time, the church of St John the Baptist was built in Adel to replace the older Saxon building. Although the present church is Norman, it looks quite similar to the late 7th century Anglo-Saxon church in Ledsham village, "the oldest church (and the oldest building) standing in West Yorkshire".

== Adel Church ==
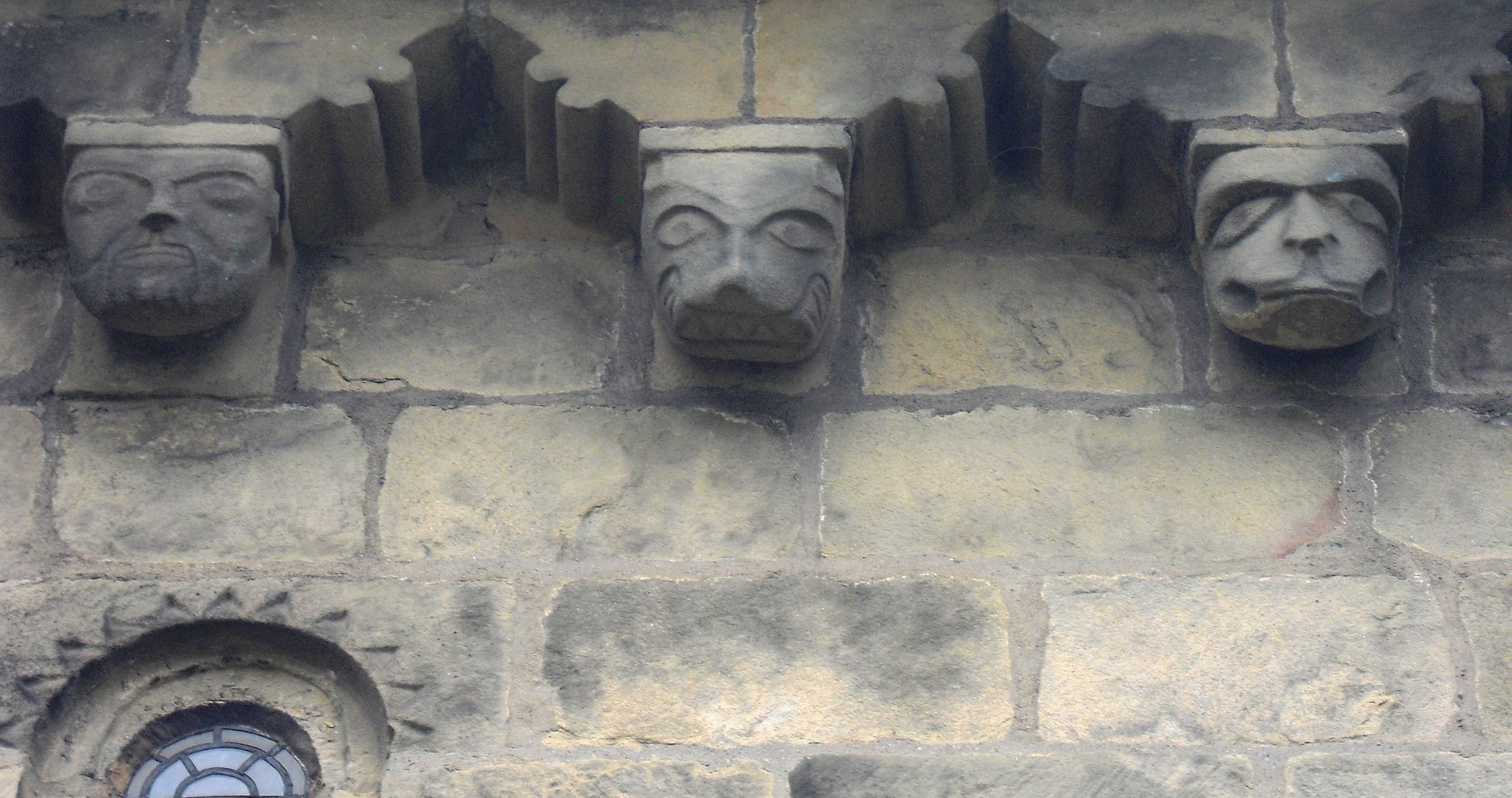
Three faces from the corbel frieze around Adel Church, Leeds, UK, c. 1150–70, with Romanesque window bottom left.

The Church of St John the Baptist, Adel parish church, is described as "one of the best and most complete Norman churches in Yorkshire". It is a Grade I listed building; the sundial, mounting block and several memorials are Grade II listed.

It was built in Romanesque style around 1150–1170 and has been little altered since, although a bell-cote was added in 1838–39 by R. D. Chantrell. The doorway, protected by a modern wooden roof, has an ornately carved arch with animals heads and zig-zag patterns; inside, there are 81 decorative corbels on the north and south walls with animals and representations of Christ's baptism and crucifixion, and the chancel arch has 37 grotesque beakheads and zig-zag decoration. Above the south doorway, the gable was filled with panels with the Evangelists and Christ in Majesty.

The medieval font has an oak canopy by Eric Gill, and possibly a leper's window survives in the chancel though the evidence for this is poor given the nearest Leper Colony was some distance away and other churches were much closer.

The Romanesque bronze doorknocker, often referred to as a Sanctuary Ring, is a replica, as the original was stolen in 2002. It was 'probably made in York c. 1200 (cf. All Saints' Pavement, York)' and 'was of excellent quality ... with a monster's head, probably a lion, clasping the ring and a man's head protruding from its mouth'. The sculpture has been understood to represent the animal swallowing a person, a warning of mankind's fate at the Day of Judgment, but it has also been suggested that 'there is nothing exaggeratedly fearsome about this lion that we should assume the man is being eaten ... he could be waking up, taking a breath, coming out of the mouth rather than being chewed or swallowed'.

Because of thefts of stones from the graveyard, all the church's paving stones are engraved with crosses.

The paternal grandparents of the Princess of Wales married at Adel Church in December 1946.

== Adel Dam ==
Adel Dam, a wildlife reserve owned and operated by Yorkshire Wildlife Trust, was opened in May 1968. The reserve covers 19 acres and there are two hides. Leeds Birdwatchers' Club originally developed the site and the Yorkshire Wildlife Trust acquired the reserve in 1987.

== Adel today ==
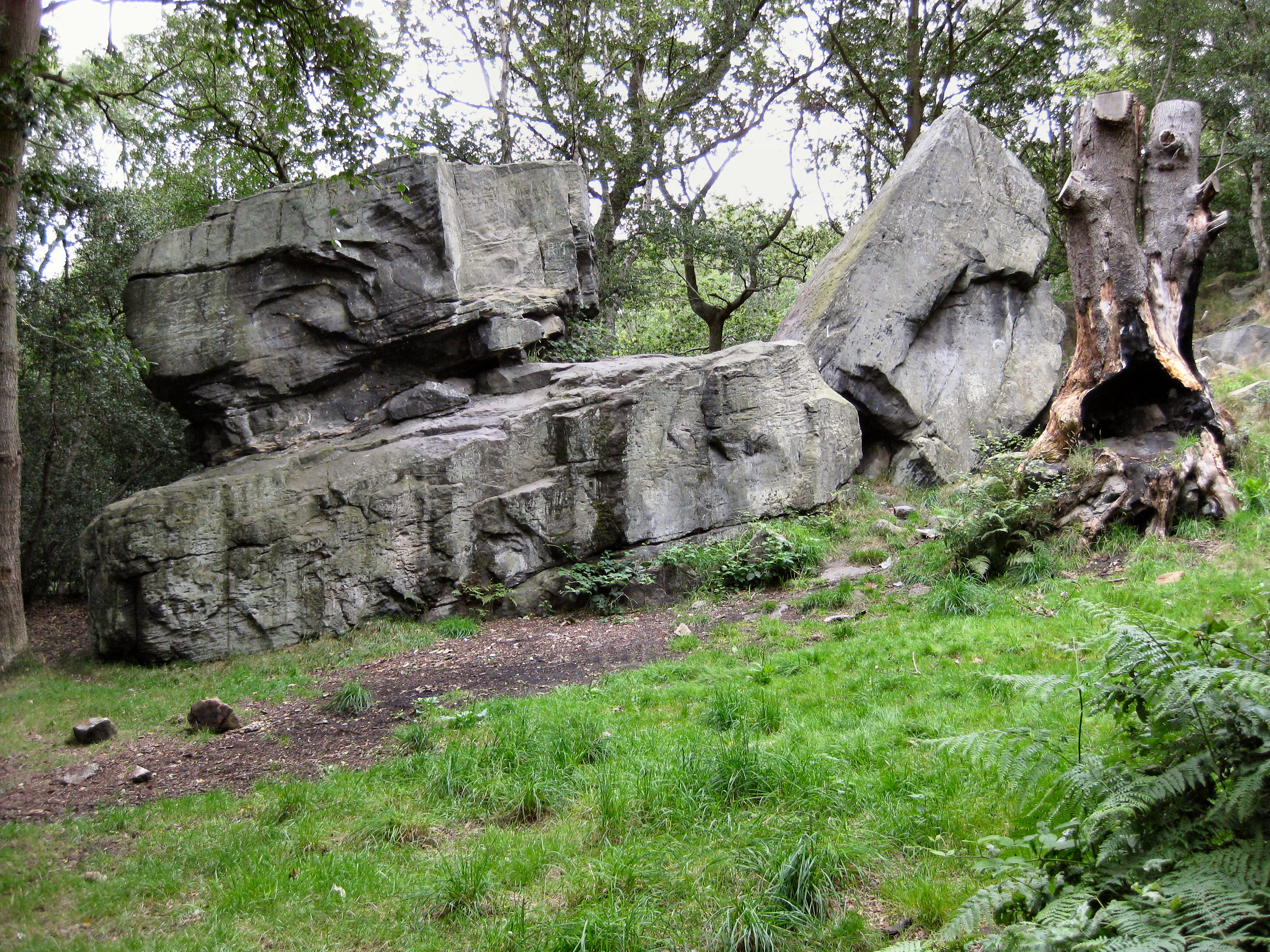
Adel Crags – rocky outcropping

Adel is a mainly residential area of Leeds close to Adel Crags and the Meanwood Valley Trail and has a distinctive countryside feel. Adel also has two primary schools, St John the Baptist Primary School and Adel Primary School.

Adel is within the Adel and Wharfedale ward of Leeds City Council and the Leeds North West parliamentary constituency, represented by Katie White MP.

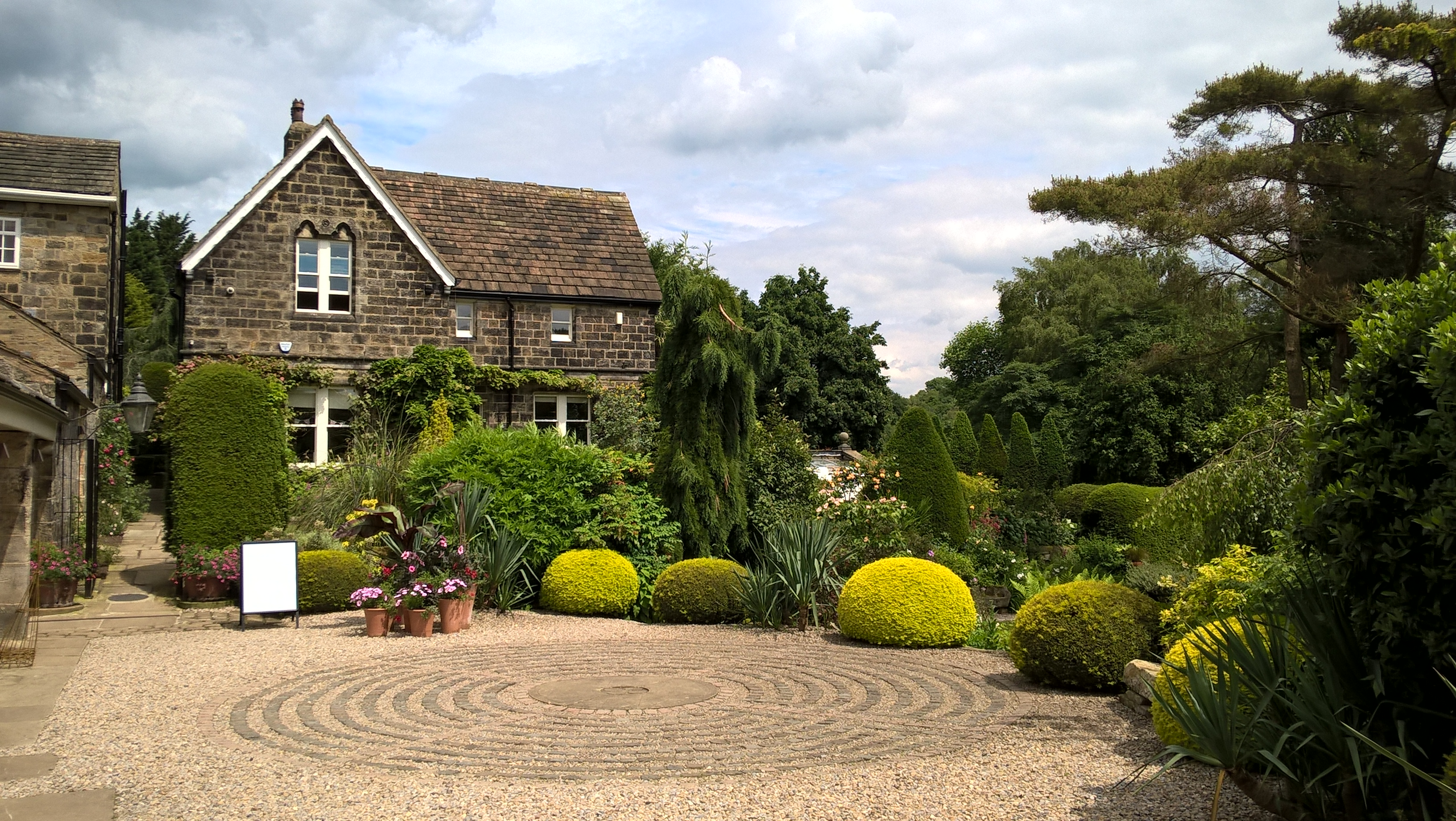
Entrance to York Gate Garden

Close to Adel Church is York Gate, an old farmhouse with a landscaped garden and a pavement maze in the driveway. The gardens, which were created by garden designer Sybil Spencer and her husband, were bequeathed to Perennial, the Gardeners' Royal Benevolent Society, on her death in 1994. The gardens are open to the public on regular occasions.

Also close to the church is the Adel Memorial Hall and sports ground. The hall was opened on 14 November 1928 as a memorial to those killed in the First World War. The engraved 20 ton stone outside the hall was moved from Adel Moor in May 1922 and erected on the site of the then future hall. The hall is home to the Bowmen of Adel, who hosted the Scorton Arrow in 1962, 1967, 1970 and 1988, and also Adel Players, an amateur dramatics group founded in 1945 that puts on three productions a year.

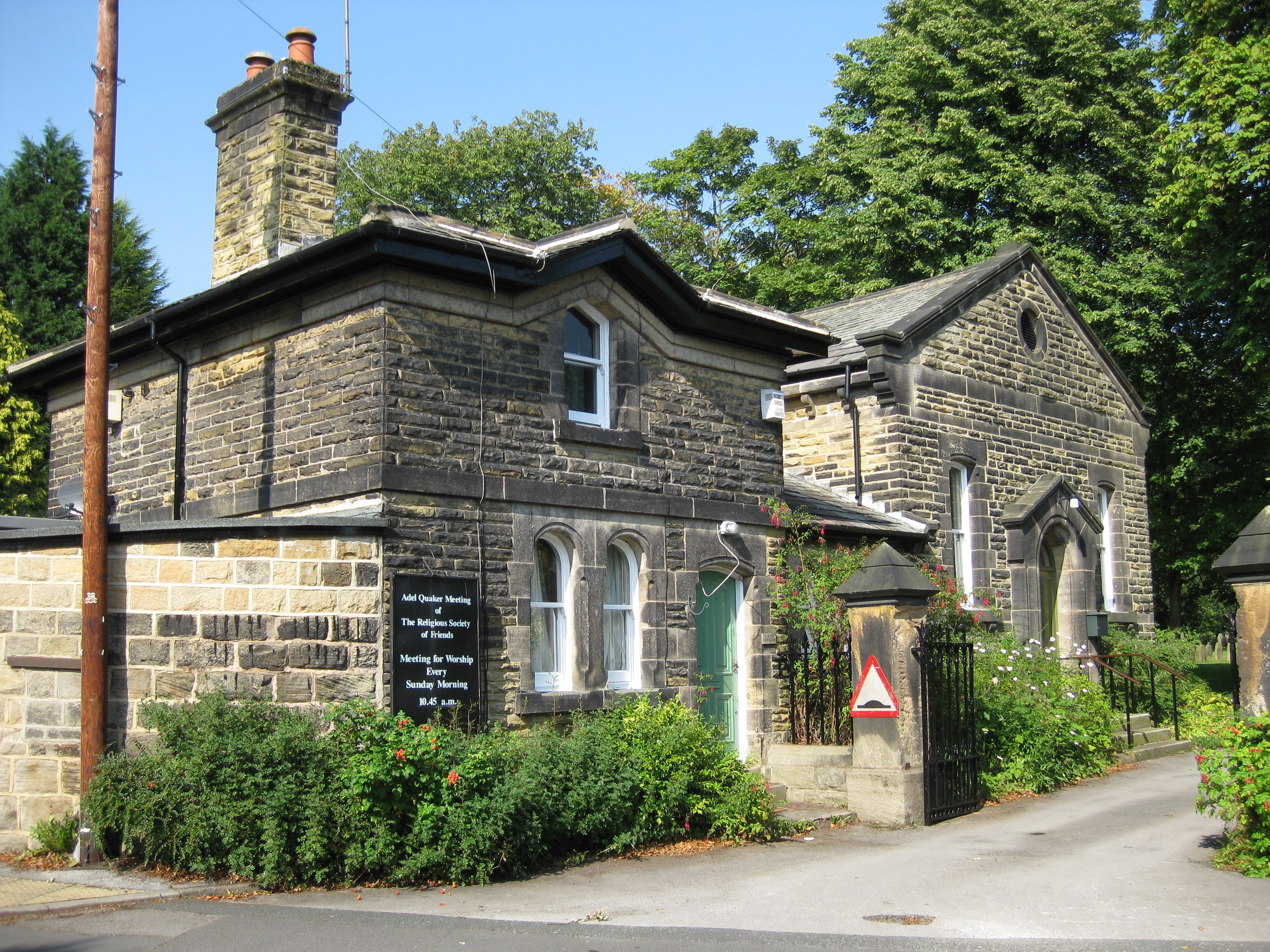
Quaker Meeting House, New Adel Lane

Adel is home to Headingley Golf club, the oldest golf club in Leeds, Adel Methodist Church and Adel Quaker Meeting House, dating from 1868.

Just to the west is the University of Leeds sports grounds and (now closed) Bodington Hall, which was previously the university's largest hall of residence.

Leeds Adel Hockey Club a large hockey club with men's, women's, mixed and junior teams is based here.

Adel is linked to Leeds city centre by buses, including the 28, operated by First Leeds.

Asda in Holt Park is incorrectly called "Asda at Adel", perhaps because, although geographically incorrect, the term Adel is a historical term that can be traced back many centuries, whereas the term "Holt Park" does not predate the area itself.

Adel Crag located near Adel Woods Car Park is an isolated rocky outcrop featuring two crags made of gritstone. There are currently 17 climbable routes that have been recorded by climbers who visit Adel Crag for bouldering.

== See also ==
- Listed buildings in Leeds (Adel and Wharfedale Ward)
