= Allerton High School =

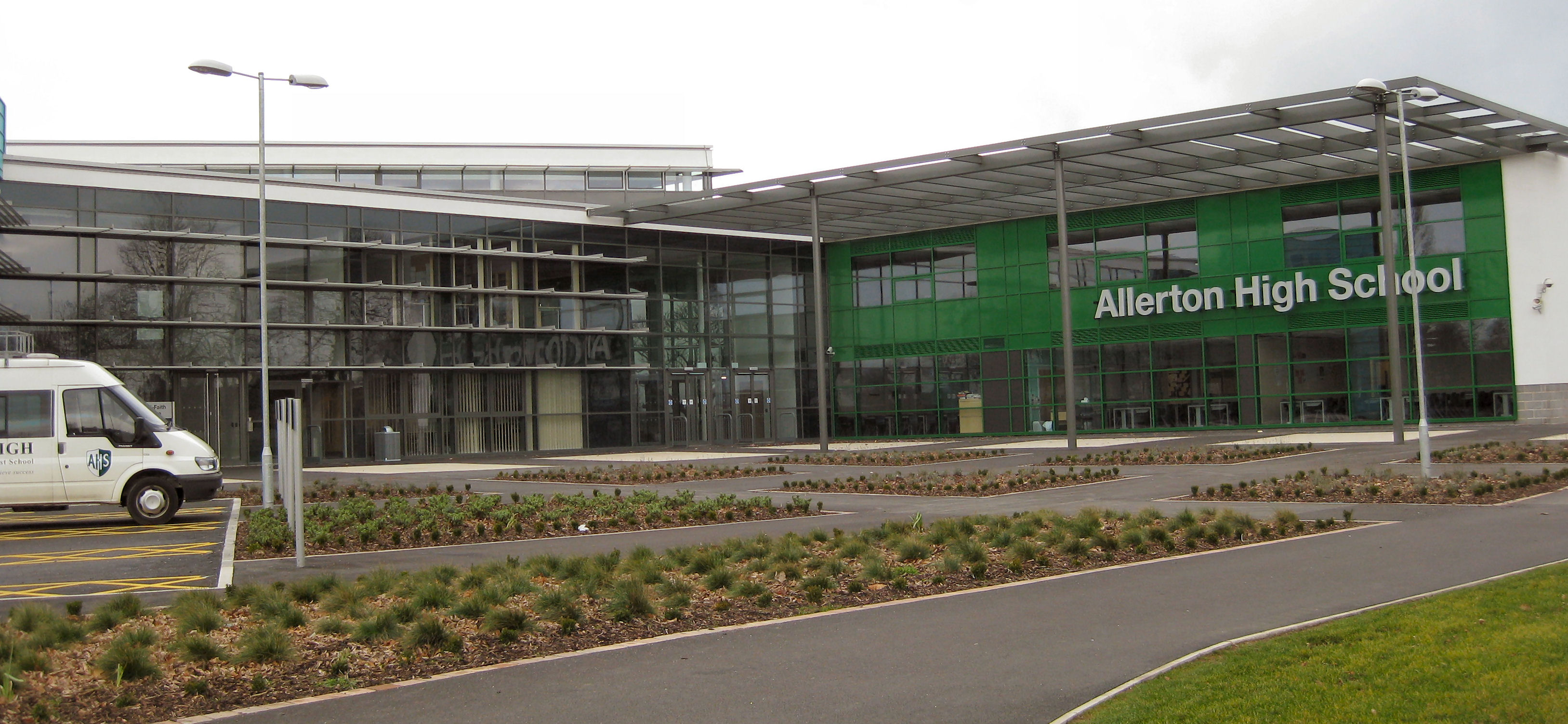
- The school in 2009

Location
- King Lane; Alwoodley; Leeds, West Yorkshire, LS17 7AG; England; 53.85035°N 1.55166°W

Information
- Type: community school
- Motto: "Enabling young people to achieve success"
- Established: 1939
- Local authority: Leeds City Council
- Department for Education URN: 108057 Tables
- Ofsted: Reports
- Headteacher: Elaine Silson
- Gender: Coeducational
- Age: 11 to 18
- Enrolment: 1,540
- Colour: Green
- Website: http://www.allertonhigh.org.uk

Allerton High School is a coeducational secondary school and sixth form located in Alwoodley, Leeds, West Yorkshire, England. It is situated around 550 yards (500 m) north of the A6120 Leeds Outer Ring Road, north of the Moor Allerton shopping centre and east of St Stephen's church. The head teacher is Elaine Silson.

== History ==
=== Grammar school ===
The school was opened in 1939 as a girls' grammar school by the City of Leeds Education Committee. The school had previously been located on Harrogate Road, near Stainbeck Lane, since 1901, and moved to Moor Allerton in 1939.

In the 1960s it had around 700 girls.

=== Comprehensive ===
In 1972, boys were included in the student body and the school became a 13–18 comprehensive. It later became an 11–18 comprehensive, and in 1992 underwent a physical expansion.

== Current buildings ==
The school moved into new buildings on 1 September 2008, and there was a formal opening by Prime Minister Gordon Brown on 28 November 2008. Planning permission was granted on 30 July 2021 for the construction of four modular teaching blocks (eight classrooms vertically stacked in two pairs including associated stair pods) for temporary use over two years.

== Other information ==
The school has a standard uniform, comprising a dark green V-necked top printed with the school logo, a white shirt, a green and white school tie, a dark green skirt (girls only) or black trousers (either sex), and black shoes (heels to be no higher than 5 cm) with black socks. A dark green or black headscarf may be worn. The school is involved in the Excellence in Cities initiative. Its motto was formerly "In Minimis Fidelis" (Be faithful in little things) but is now "Enabling Young People To Achieve Success".

The new building includes a substantial multi-faith centre.

The school was used in 2010 for the filming of Married Single Other, making it one of a small number in Leeds to be used on television including Allerton Grange School and Foxwood School.

The name of the school's head teacher Elaine Silson is one of those featured on the sculpture Ribbons, unveiled in 2024.

== Notable former pupils ==
- Soul singer Corinne Bailey Rae attended in the 1990s and became head girl.
- Celebrity chef Marco Pierre White attended the school but left without any qualifications.
- Singer/Songwriter, author and radio personality Jason Feddy attended from 1979 to 1983.

=== Girls' grammar school ===
- Fanny Waterman, piano educator and concert pianist who founded the Leeds International Pianoforte Competition (educated at Chapel Allerton High School, the predecessor), and also later taught at the school on King Lane from 1943.
- Helen Williams, director of school Curriculum and pupil well-being at the Department for Education since 2006, married to David Forrester, director from 1995 to 2001 of further education and youth training at the DfEE.

== See also ==
- Allerton Grange School, situated in Moortown towards the A61
