= Adel Hockey Club =

Field hockey club in Leeds, England

- Full name: Adel Hockey Club
- Nickname: Adel
- Founded: 1946
- Ground: Adel War Memorial Association, Church Lane, Adel
- League: Yorkshire & North East Hockey League
- Website: http://www.adelhockey.co.uk

Adel Hockey Club (formerly known as Leeds Adel Hockey Club) is a field hockey club based in Adel, Leeds, England. Founded in 1946, the club is based at the Adel War Memorial Association (AWMA).

The club is the largest in the Leeds area, and one of the largest in the North of England with over 500 members. The club fields six men's teams, six women's teams playing in the Yorkshire and North East Hockey Leagues, two development teams, boys and girls junior teams of all ages, mixed, indoor and masters teams.

Adel offers year-round hockey including the regions biggest summer league, and is a multi-generation community club.

== History ==
The hockey club first played as a mixed team in 1946, and later the same year forming a Men's 1st XI with an inaugural tour to Aberdeen. Adel Hockey Club was originally a semi-nomadic side playing at Bedquilts, then Ireland Wood and then Soldiers Field.

The invitation to join the multi-sports venue of the Adel War Memorial Association in 1962 gave the club luxuries other local clubs did not have including changing rooms and high-quality grass pitches. In 1970 the club merged with Fulneck Old Boys.

A decision was made in 1971 to level, drain and seed the top field for hockey and to create a Ladies section.

The club first laid an artificial surface in 1997, and the first game was played on 29 June 1997. In 2014 after hard fundraising efforts, a new surface was laid and unveiled in time for the start of the 2014-15 season.

More recently, the club won Ladies Team of the Year (Women's 1st XI) at the England Hockey Awards in 2016. The Men's 1st XI were shortlisted for the England Hockey Men's Team of the Year award in 2018. Paul Lewis was shortlisted for the England Hockey Unsung Hero Award in 2018. The Mixed 1st XI reached the semi-finals of the England Hockey Championships played at Lee Valley Hockey and Tennis Centre at the Queen Elizabeth Olympic Park in June 2019. Alice Bowler received "Highly Commended" recognition for the England Hockey Unsung Club Hero Award in 2024.

The club gained planning permission for a new 4 changing room facility, with an associated club room, directly adjacent to their home pitch in September 2025. Associated fundraising included the then Chair, Sam Jackson, raising over £10,000 by running the entire 128 mile length of the Leeds and Liverpool Canal in just over 23 hours.
