= Listed buildings in Alwoodley =

Alwoodley is a civil parish and a ward in the metropolitan borough of the City of Leeds, West Yorkshire, England. The parish and ward contain 16 listed buildings that are recorded in the National Heritage List for England. All the listed buildings are designated at Grade II, the lowest of the three grades, which is applied to "buildings of national importance and special interest". The area is to the north of the centre of Leeds, and contains the districts of Alwoodley and Moor Allerton. Most of the southern part is residential, and the northern part is rural. The majority of the listed buildings are houses, cottages and associated structures, farmhouses and farm buildings, and some farm buildings have been converted for residential use. There is also a mill converted into a dwelling. The other listed buildings include a road bridge, an aqueduct, a well or reservoir, a church and its lych gate, and a war memorial.

== Buildings ==
Name and location	Photograph	Date	Notes
Moss Hall; 53.86214°N 1.54135°W		1583	The house is in gritstone with quoins and a blue slate roof. There are two storeys and five bays. The windows have moulded surrounds, the mullions have been removed, and modern casement windows inserted.
Bywater Farmhouse; 53.84329°N 1.56753°W		Mid 18th century	The farmhouse, which incorporates 17th-century material, is in gritstone on a plinth, with quoins, a band, and a slate roof. There are two storeys and two bays. The doorway has been re-set, and the windows are mullioned with three lights. At the rear is a doorway with a Tudor arched lintel.
King Lane Farmhouse; 53.86390°N 1.56927°W		Mid 18th century	The farmhouse which was later extended, is in gritstone with quoins and a stone slate roof. There are two storeys, initially there two bays, and later two bays were added to the right and a small bay to the left. On the front is a porch, in the earlier part the windows are casements, and in the later parts they are sashes.
The Maltings, Croft End Cottage and Adel Mill; 53.86291°N 1.58311°W	—	Mid 18th century	A block of buildings, including a stable range, a barn and a former corn mill, converted into houses in about 1990. They are in gritstone with quoins and stone slate roofs. From the right are former stables with two storeys and three bays that contain a former round-arched passageway with a keystone, and at right angles is a former mill building with three storeys and mullioned windows, then a two-story link to the former barn converted into two cottages, with four bays, containing a segmental cart arch. At the rear is the main mill building with three storeys and small windows.
The Tudors and Victoria House; 53.86284°N 1.58258°W	—	Mid 18th century	A farmhouse converted into two houses, in gritstone with stone slate roofs. Each house has two storeys and three bays. The Tudors, on the left, has quoins, coped gables and moulded kneelers. It contains a central doorway with tie-stone jambs and mullioned windows with sashes. Victoria House has a moulded string course, an arched doorway with a fanlight and recessed spandrels, and a full-height canted bay window.
Herd Farmhouse; 53.87486°N 1.52886°W		1760	The farmhouse is in stone with quoins, shaped eaves brackets, and a stone slate roof with coped gables and kneelers. There are two storeys, attics and cellars, and three bays. The central doorway has a fanlight, above it is a single-light window, and the other windows are two-light sliding casements.
Barn, Herd Farm; 53.87489°N 1.52925°W		1760	A barn, byres, stables and granary in gritstone, with quoins, a stone slate roof, and six bays. The openings include a large arched entrance with a keystone, windows, vents, and doorways, some of which are blocked. External stone steps lead up to the granary.
Smithy, Herd Farm; 53.87475°N 1.52917°W	—	1760 (probable)	The smithy is in gritstone with quoins and a stone slate roof. There is one storey and two bays. The building contains a doorway and a central square window.
Milestone; 53.86181°N 1.56614°W		1764 (or 1664)	The milestone is at the junction of King Lane and Alwoodley Lane. It is in millstone grit, about 1 metre (3 ft 3 in) high, and 0.4 metres (1 ft 4 in) wide, with a rounded top. The milestone is inscribed on two faces with pointing hands, and the distances to Leeds, Otley, York and Wetherby.
Adel Mill Farmhouse; 53.86312°N 1.58255°W	—	Late 18th century	The farmhouse is in gritstone with quoins, and a stone slate roof with coped gables. There are two storeys, three bays, and a single-storey three-bay range to the left. The central doorway has a fanlight.
Langley Well; 53.88375°N 1.55048°W	—	Late 18th century	A well or reservoir, it is in stone with stone slate roofs. There is a rectangular outer wall 4 metres (13 ft) high with rounded coping and a doorway. Inside is a rectangular reservoir with a small doorway at one end and a circular window at the other containing a segmental arched vault.
Swallow, Millrace and Mistal Cottage; 53.86255°N 1.58292°W	—	Late 18th century	A range of farm buildings, including stables and a cart shed, converted into houses in about 1990. They are in gritstone with quoins, and stone slate roofs with coped gables and moulded kneelers. The cart shed has been converted into a single-storey house and garages.
Stair and Low Fold Cottage; 53.86264°N 1.58246°W	—	Late 18th or early 19th century	A barn and an outbuilding converted into two houses, they are in gritstone with a stone slate roof. There are two storeys and a rear outshut. On the front is a tall barn entrance with quoined jambs, a doorway, and small windows.
Shadwell Grange, Stable Cottage, and Shadwell Grange Farmhouse; 53.85412°N 1.50340°W		c. 1810	The older part consists of the farmhouse and outbuildings, Shadwell Grange is a large house added in 1821–31, and altered in 1903; all the buildings are in gritstone. The farm buildings form a U-shaped plan, with the farmhouse in the northeast corner. The farmhouse has a stone slate roof, two storeys and four bays, a doorway with an architrave, and sash windows. The outbuildings include a barn and a stable converted into a cottage. The Grange has a slate roof, two storeys, sides of five bays, and a rear service wing. On the garden front is a full-height bow window, bands, sash windows, a parapet and a central pediment. The entrance in the left return has a rusticated surround, double doors, a traceried fanlight, pilasters, and a pediment with a heraldic crest above.
Outbuilding, Shadwell Grange Farm; 53.85461°N 1.50295°W	—	c. 1820	The outbuilding, probably a stable block, is in gritstone with a stone slate roof, two storeys and three bays. The middle bay has a small coped gable with a ball finial, and in the upper floor is a loading door. Elsewhere are two doorways and small square windows.
Cart shed, Adel Mill Farm; 53.86301°N 1.58233°W	—	Early 19th century (probable)	The cart shed is in gritstone, and has a replaced pantile roof. There is one storey and seven bays, two of which are partly blocked.
Mount Farmhouse; 53.86218°N 1.54714°W		Early 19th century	The farmhouse, later a private house, is in gritstone with a hipped slate roof. There are two storeys and sides of three bays. The central doorway has a fanlight, and the windows are renewed sashes.
Stairfoot Bridge; 53.85793°N 1.57749°W		c. 1830	The bridge carries Stairfoot Lane over Adel Beck. It is in gritstone, and consists of a single round arch with bands, and a parapet of large blocks. On the upstream side are pilasters.
Tudor Cottage; 53.85461°N 1.50317°W		c. 1830	A pair of cottages in the grounds of Shadwell Grange, they are in gritstone with stone slate roofs. There are two storeys and two bays, and a single-storey, two-bay wing on the right. The doorways have chamfered surrounds, Tudor arched heads, and hood moulds. The windows are mullioned with arched lights and hood moulds, and in the wing are horizontal-sliding sashes.
Seven Arches Aqueduct and conduit façade 53.85051°N 1.56664°W		c. 1840	The aqueduct was built to cross Adel Beck for the supply of water to Leeds, and the conduit was added in 1866. The aqueduct is in stone and consists of seven arches on rectangular piers with stepped voussoirs, and a moulded string course. The conduit has gritstone curbs and revetment walls, and a façade in cast iron with mouldings, panels, an inscription, and the date.
Walls and gate piers, Adel Mill; 53.86264°N 1.58228°W	—	Mid 19th century	The boundary walls of the housing complex and the gate piers are in gritstone. The wall has rounded coping, it is about 1 metre (3 ft 3 in) high and extends for about 30 metres (98 ft). The gate piers are monolithic and have rounded ogee tops.
St John's Church, Moor Allerton; 53.84914°N 1.53472°W		1853	The church, which was enlarged in 1889, is in gritstone with a grey slate roof. It has a cruciform plan, consisting of a nave, north and south transepts, a chancel with a north vestry and an organ chamber, and a west steeple. The steeple has a three-stage tower with stepped buttresses, a south doorway and a broach spire with lucarnes. The windows are lancets.
Former Leeds Industrial School; 53.85143°N 1.51965°W		1879	The school, later converted for residential use, is in gritstone with a slate roof, two storeys, and five bays. The outer and centre bays have pedimented and coped gables, the outer bays projecting as cross-wings. The doorway has a moulded surround, a fanlight, an entablature, and a cornice on console brackets. The sash windows have been replaced, and there are circular windows in the gables of the outer bays. In the gable of the middle bay is an inscribed and dated plaque.
The Lodge; 53.85441°N 1.50519°W		1903	The lodge to Shadwell Grange, it is in gritstone with a hipped grey slate roof. There is one storey and an attic, and two bays. To the right is a flat-roofed timber porch with Ionic columns, and to the left is a canted bay window in a projecting bay. Above and in the right return are dormers with segmental pediments.
Lych gate, St John's Church; 53.84881°N 1.53438°W		1913	The lych gate is at the entrance to the churchyard. It consists of a low stone wall with timber superstructure. There is a framework of vertical posts, a flat arch, and a gable with carved bargeboards and a pendant. Inside the north wall is an inscribed plaque.
War memorial 53.84872°N 1.53463°W		1921	The war memorial is in the churchyard of St John's Church. It is in Portland stone, and has a base of three steps, a chamfered plinth, a two-tier cross base, a tapering octagonal shaft, and a plain cross with inset panels. On the plinth is an inscription and a bronze plaque.
