= Alwoodley =

Suburb of Leeds and civil parish in West Yorkshire, England

Coordinates: 53.8599°N 1.5331°W

- Suburb
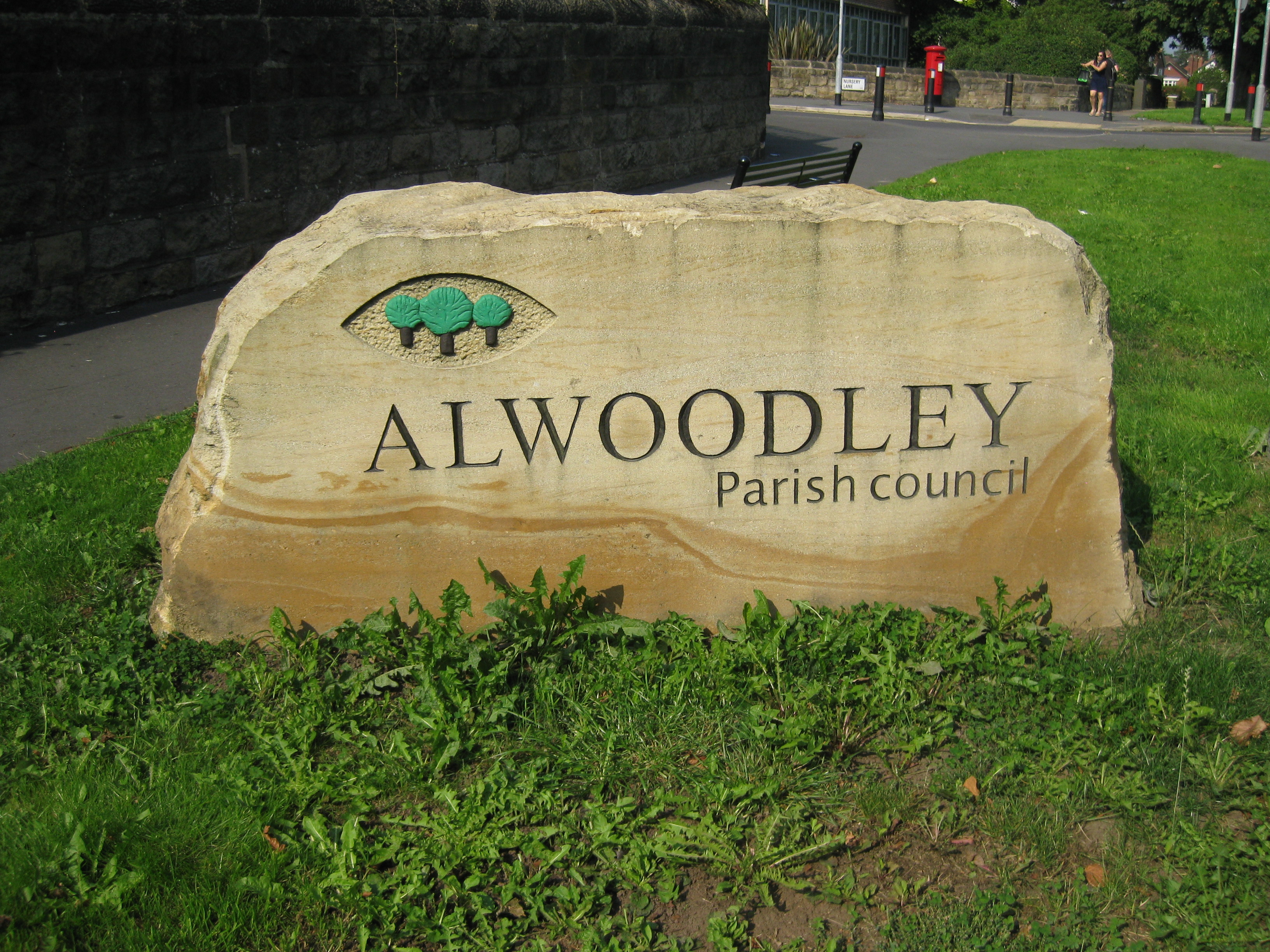
- Parish boundary marker on the A61 Harrogate Road

- Location within City of Leeds Location within West Yorkshire
- Population: 8,818 (2011)
- OS grid reference: SE303378
- Metropolitan borough: City of Leeds
- Metropolitan county: West Yorkshire
- Region: Yorkshire and the Humber
- Country: England
- Sovereign state: United Kingdom
- Post town: LEEDS
- Postcode district: LS17
- Dialling code: 0113
- Police: West Yorkshire
- Fire: West Yorkshire
- Ambulance: Yorkshire
- UK Parliament: Leeds North East

Alwoodley is a suburb and civil parish on the outskirts of Leeds in West Yorkshire, England. It is 5 miles (8.0 km) north of central Leeds and is one of the most affluent areas of the county. Alwoodley lies in the LS17 postcode area which was reported to contain the most expensive housing area in Yorkshire and the Humber by The Times.

The area is situated in the Alwoodley ward of Leeds City Council and Leeds North East parliamentary constituency.

== Geography ==
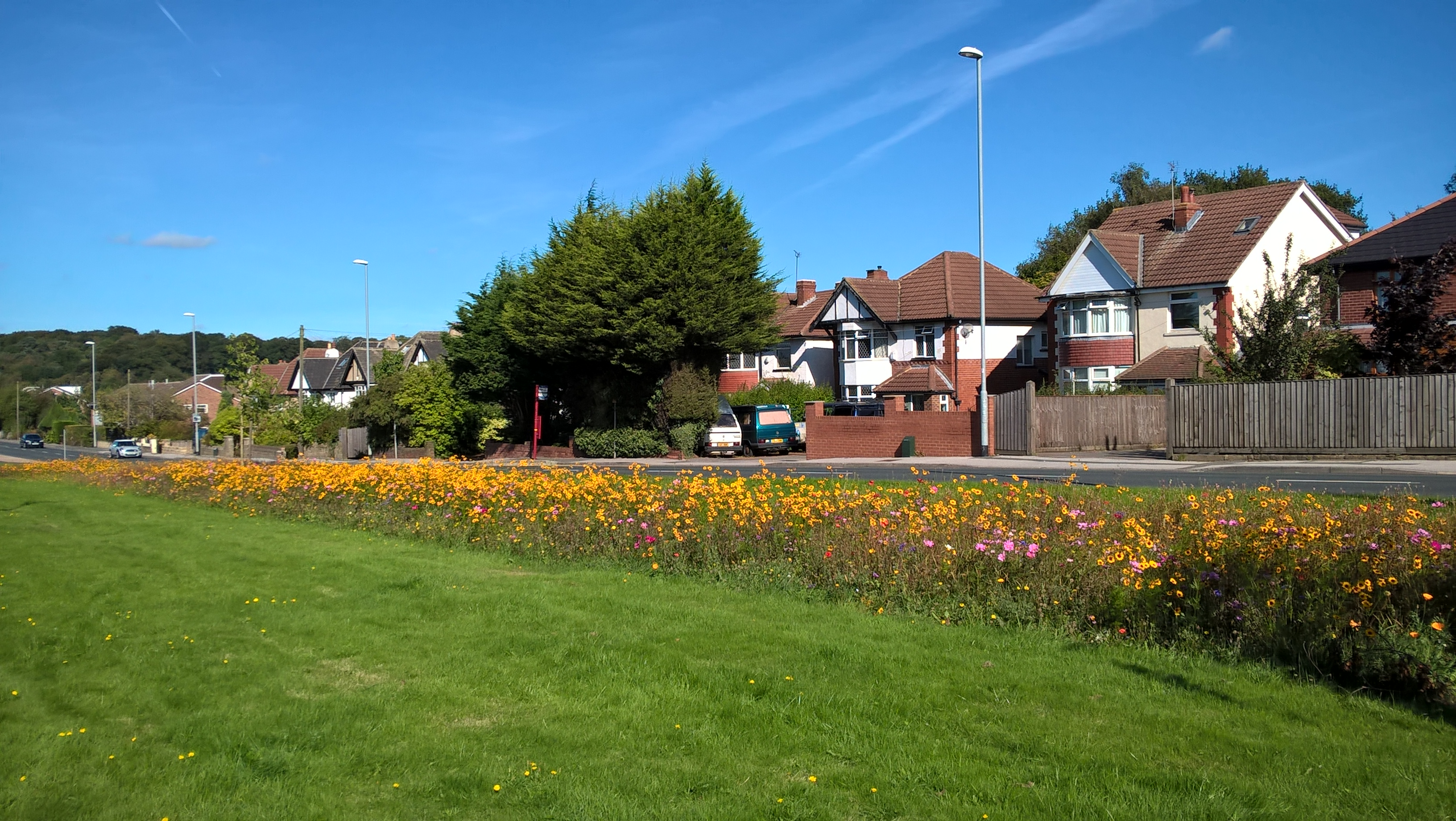
King Lane

The area comprises a large part of the postcode LS17, which contains most of north Leeds and the surrounding countryside. On either side of Alwoodley is Adel, to the west, and Shadwell, to the east. Most of the housing is between Nursery Lane and Alwoodley Lane. To the south are Moor Allerton and Moortown. The area to the north is mainly countryside, including the Eccup Reservoir, two golf courses, and the Harewood Estate.

The Harewood Estate comprises approximately 4,000 acres of land in total including Harewood House, an 18th Century country house designed by architects John Carr and Robert Adam, built for Edwin Lascelles, 1st Baron Harewood. The landscape was designed by Lancelot "Capability" Brown and spans 1,000 acres (400 ha). The house is the family seat of the Lascelles family, and home of David Lascelles, the Eighth Earl of Harewood.

== History ==
The name Alwoodley is thought to derive from Old English Æthelwald-lēah, meaning 'the woodland clearing (lēah), at Æthelwald's farm'. It appears as Aluuoldelei in the 1086 Domesday Book.

The route of the Roman road between Ilkley and Tadcaster, road 72b in Margary's numbering, passes through Alwoodley. Part of it was excavated along Lakeland Crescent in 1994.

Alwoodley became part of the County Borough of Leeds on 1 April 1928 as a consequence of the passage of the Leeds Corporation Act 1927.

=== Civil Parish ===
The civil parish boundaries are from Nursery Lane on the south, following the Meanwood Valley Trail on the west, the A61 Harrogate Road on the east. The northern boundaries are in countryside between Harewood to the northeast and Arthington to the northwest. Note that Alwoodley Gates is an area to the east of the A61 inside the Harewood civil parish.

=== Electoral Ward ===
The Electoral Ward includes the above area, but also Alwoodley Gates to the east and southwards part of Moortown as far as the Leeds Outer Ring Road. This article will include this larger area, which includes certain institutions associated with the area but just outside the civil parish boundary.

As of 2023 the councillors for this ward (all Conservatives) are Neil Buckley, Dan Cohen and Lyn Buckley.

=== Church of England Parish ===
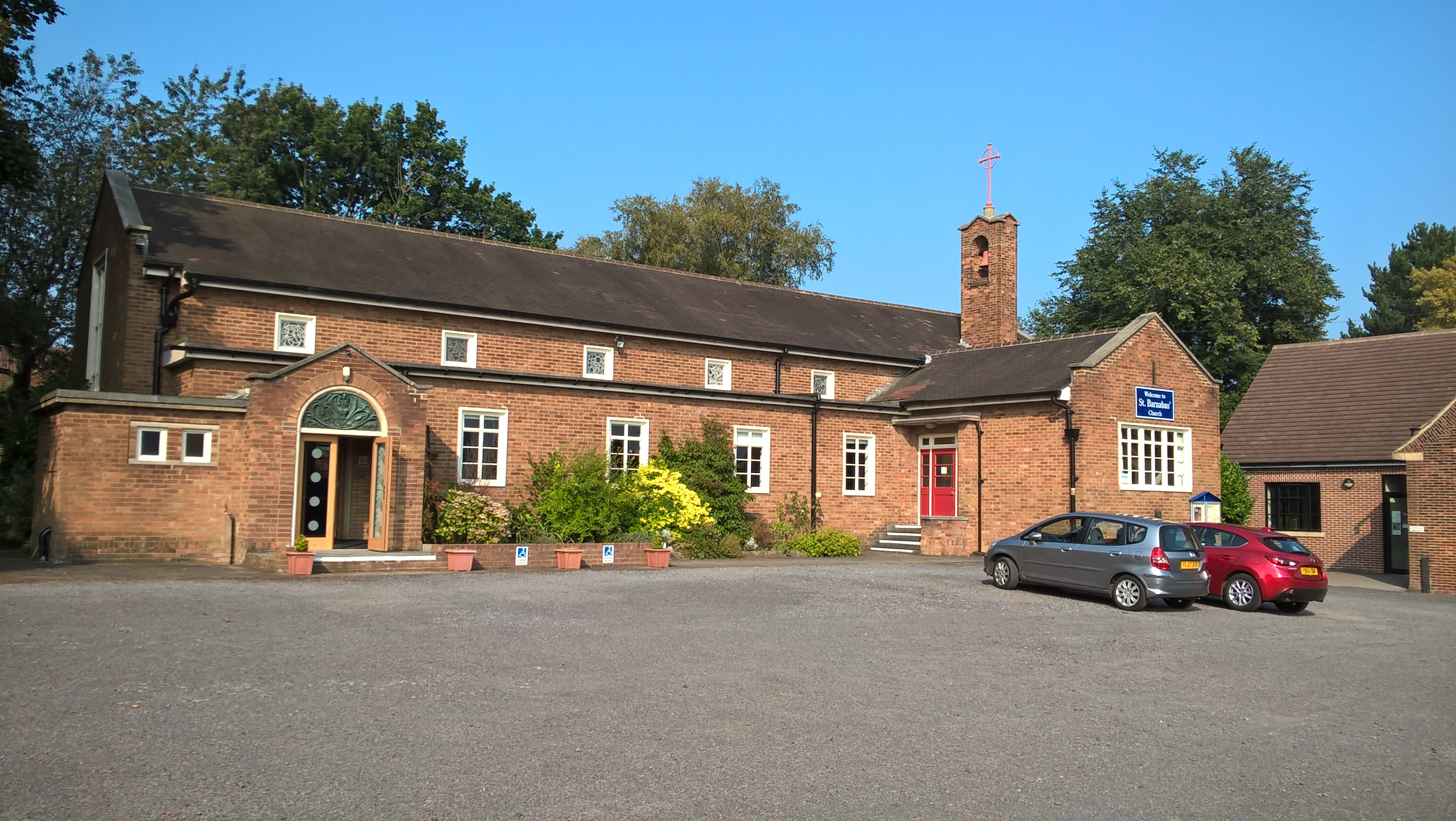
St Barnabas Church

The Church of England parish of Alwoodley is based upon the church of St Barnabas, in the Diocese of Leeds. The parish boundaries extend from King Lane in the West to the A58 Wetherby Road to the East, thus including Shadwell. They also include part of Moortown south of the Ring Road around Moortown Corner.

== Housing ==
The former mansion, Alwoodley Old Hall, was close to the south side of Eccup Reservoir: it was demolished in 1969, and the grounds were used for Sandmoor Golf Club, north of Alwoodley Lane.

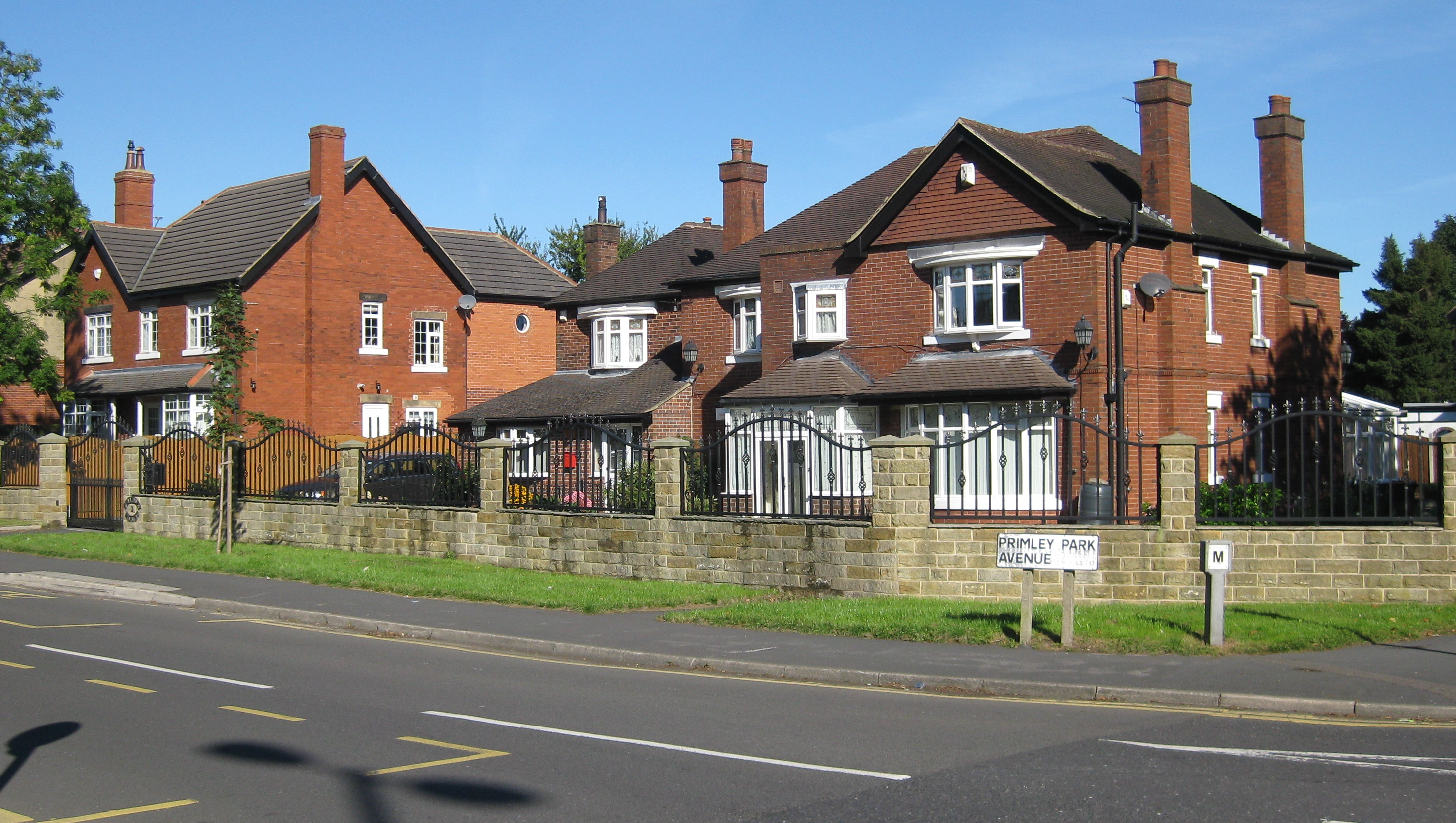
Primley Park Avenue

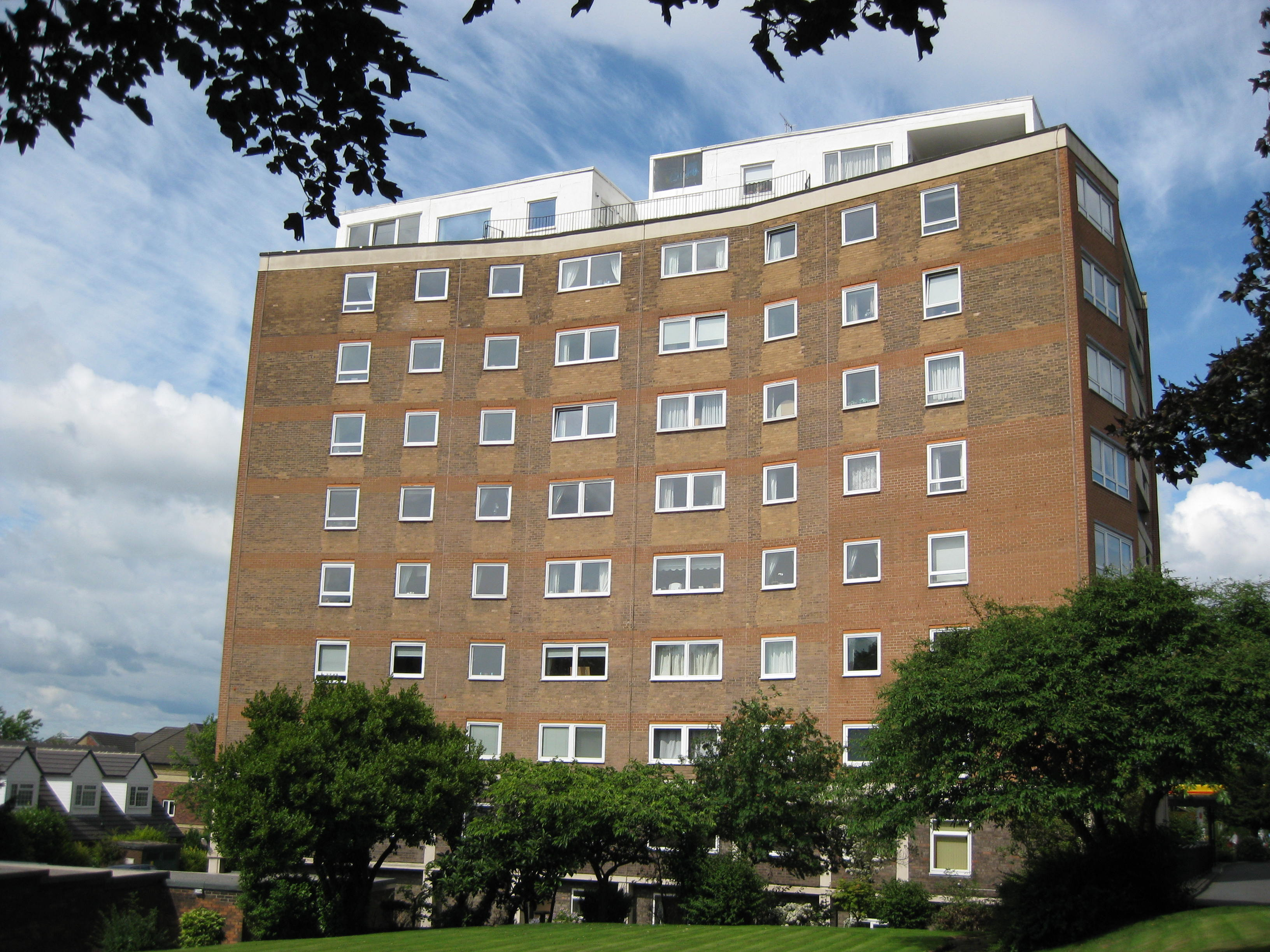
Sandmoor Court

The centre is a large open area, including Moortown Golf Club and Rugby Club and former farmland known as Alwoodley Moss. Around it are 4 regions of housing, nearly all low-rise, semi-detached or detached. In the northwest corner (junction bounded by King Lane to the west and Alwoodley Lane to the North) is housing called Alwoodley Park and includes street names such as "The Avenue", "The Lane", "The Drive" etc. reflecting the former more isolated nature of the original village. In the northeast corner (junction bounded by Alwoodley Lane on the north and Harrogate Road on the east) is the Sandmoor Estate. In the southeast corner (bounded by Nursery Lane on the south and Harrogate Road on the east) is the Primley Park area. Where Sandmoor and Primley Park join is Sandmoor Court, a block of flats. The southwest corner (bounded by Nursery Lane to the south and King Lane to the west) consists of housing on streets such as the Sunningdales, the Birkdales and the Turnberrys.

The residential areas on and around the Sandmoors, Alwoodley Lane and Wigton Lane are amongst the most exclusive in Leeds, with many large detached family homes, imposing mansions and exclusive flat developments. Some of the most valuable residential properties in Yorkshire are in Alwoodley.

== Education ==
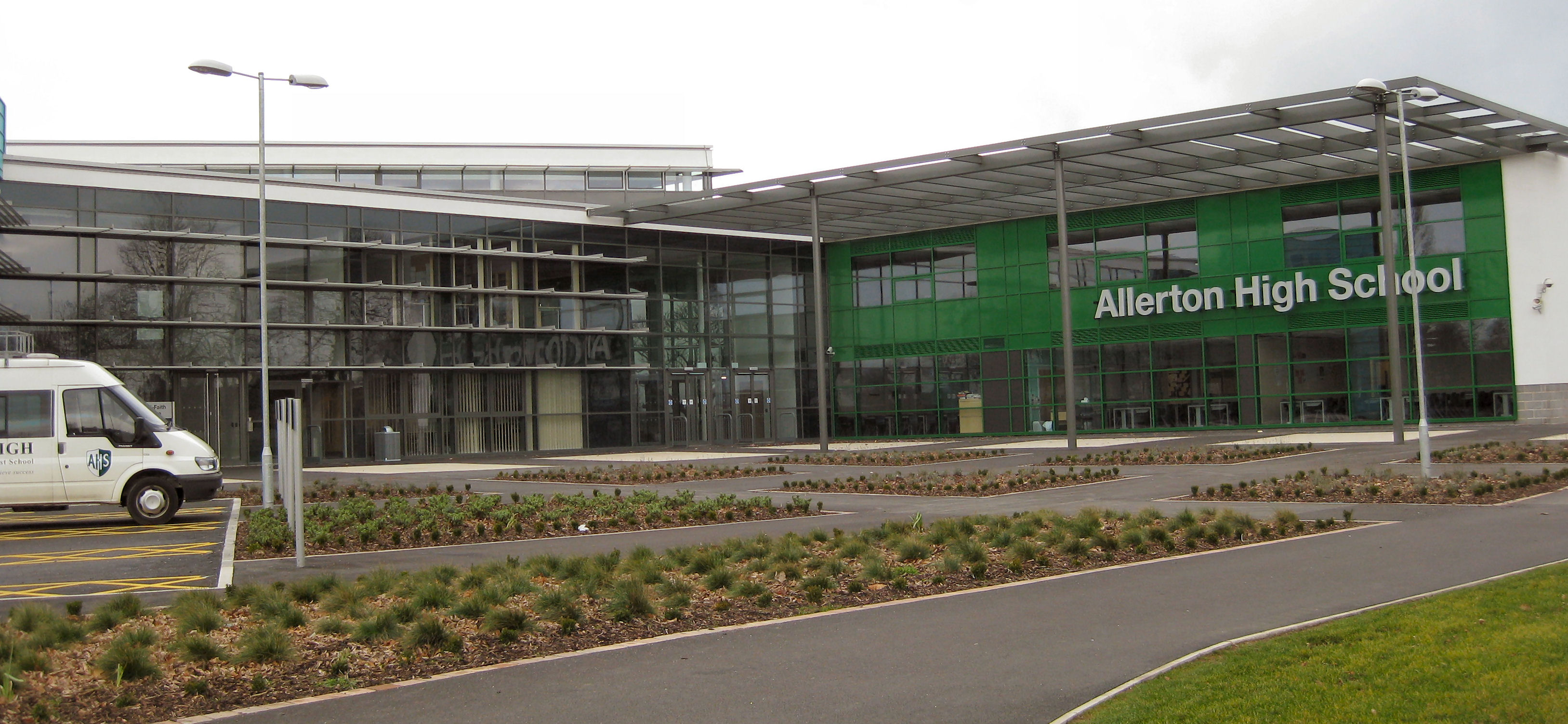
Allerton High School

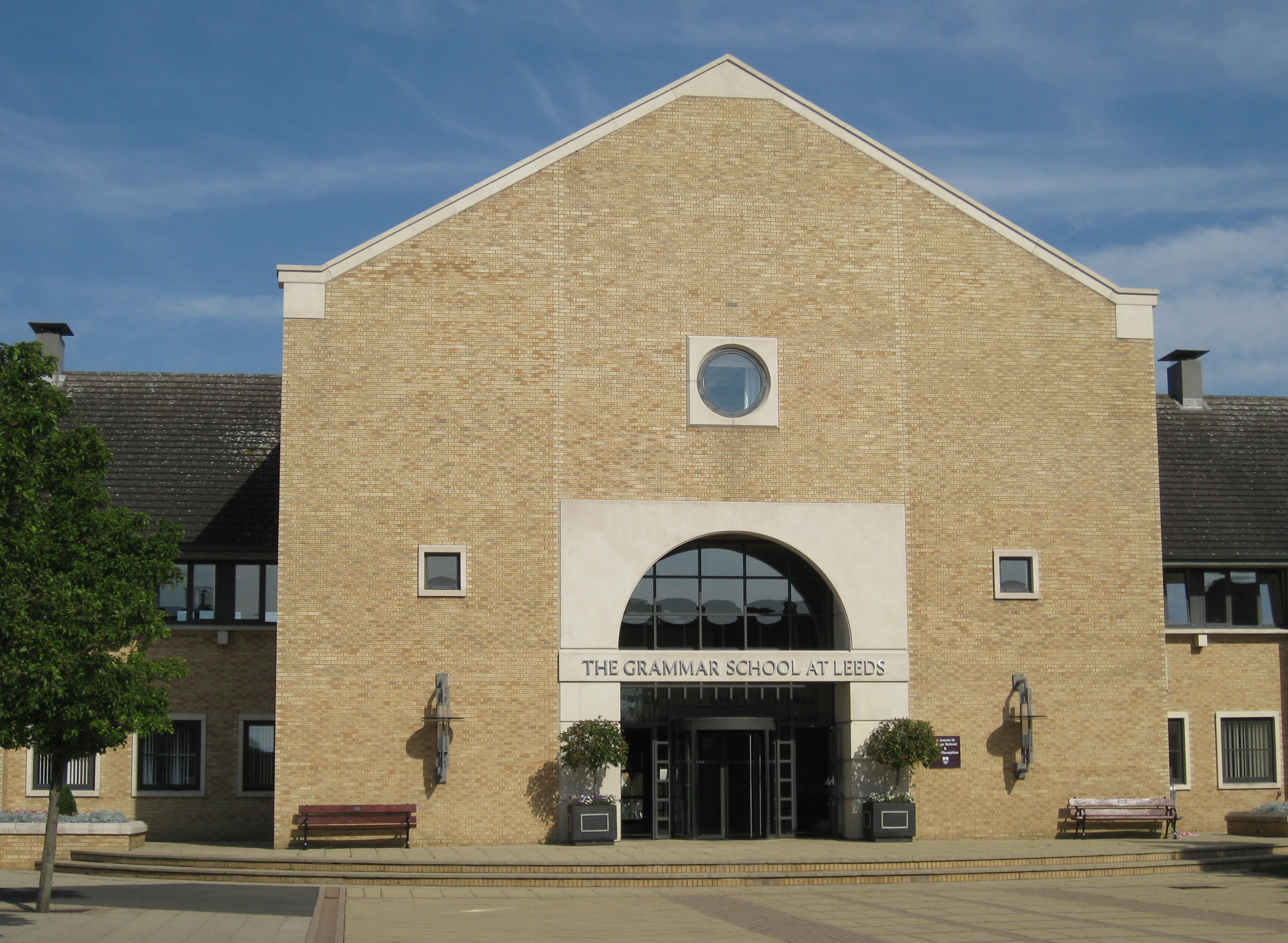
The Grammar School at Leeds

The two largest schools in the area are The Grammar School at Leeds Junior & Senior site (a fee-paying private school formerly known as Leeds Grammar School) and Allerton High School (a state secondary school). Alwoodley is served by two Jewish Faith Schools, both on the Henry Cohen Campus, Brodetsky Primary School, and a high school, Leeds Jewish Free School, which was founded in 2013 by local city councillor, Dan Cohen.

== Sport ==
There are three golf clubs within the area, namely Alwoodley, Moortown and Sand Moor. Moortown hosted the 1929 Ryder Cup. Alwoodley Cricket Club dates back to 1935. There are two Rugby Union clubs in the area: Leodiensian RUFC and Moortown Rugby Club.

Alwoodley is also home to Alwoodley FC, a football team that compete in the top tier of the Yorkshire Amateur League.

== Gallery ==
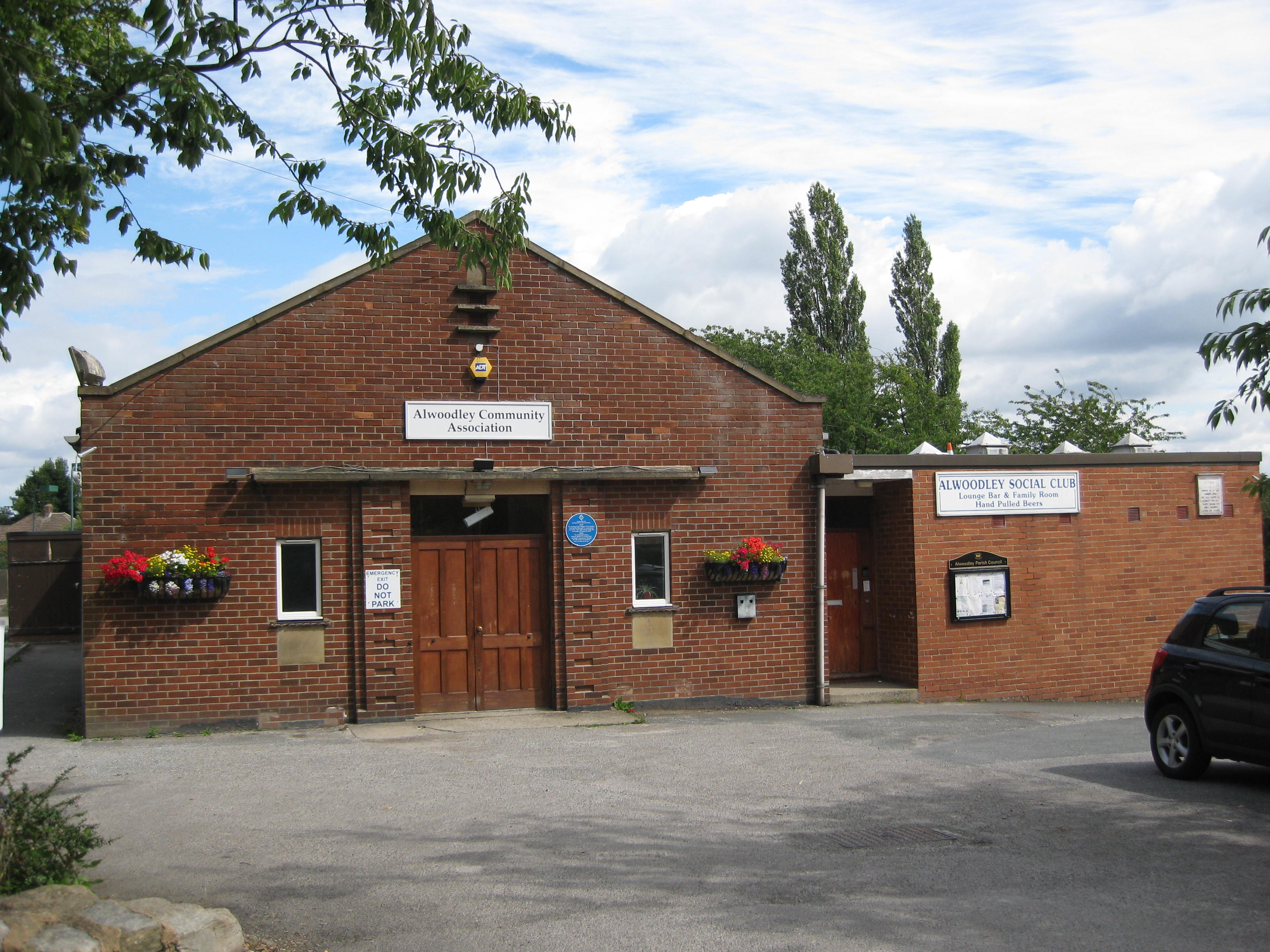
Alwoodley Community Association

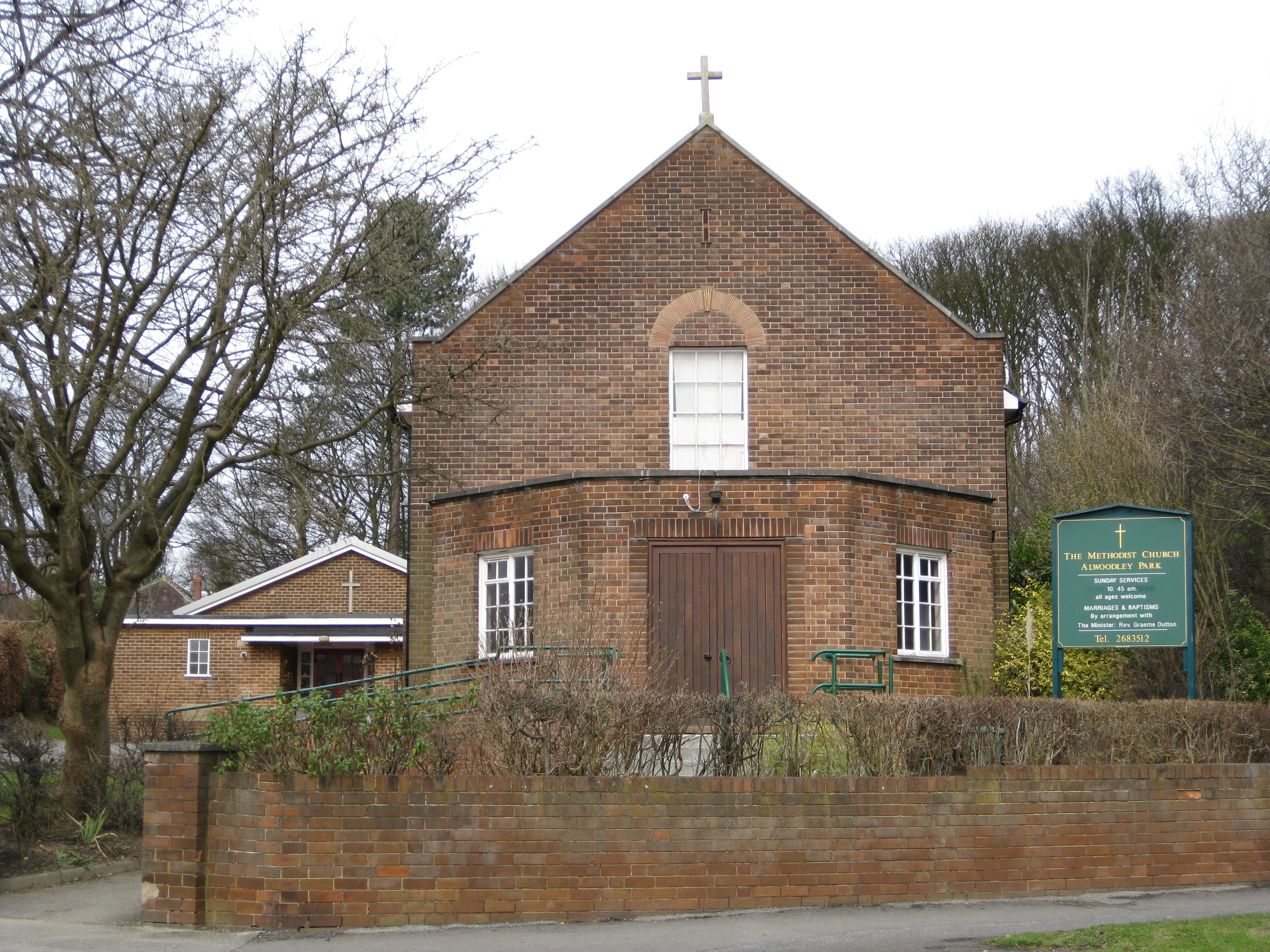
Alwoodley Park Methodist Church

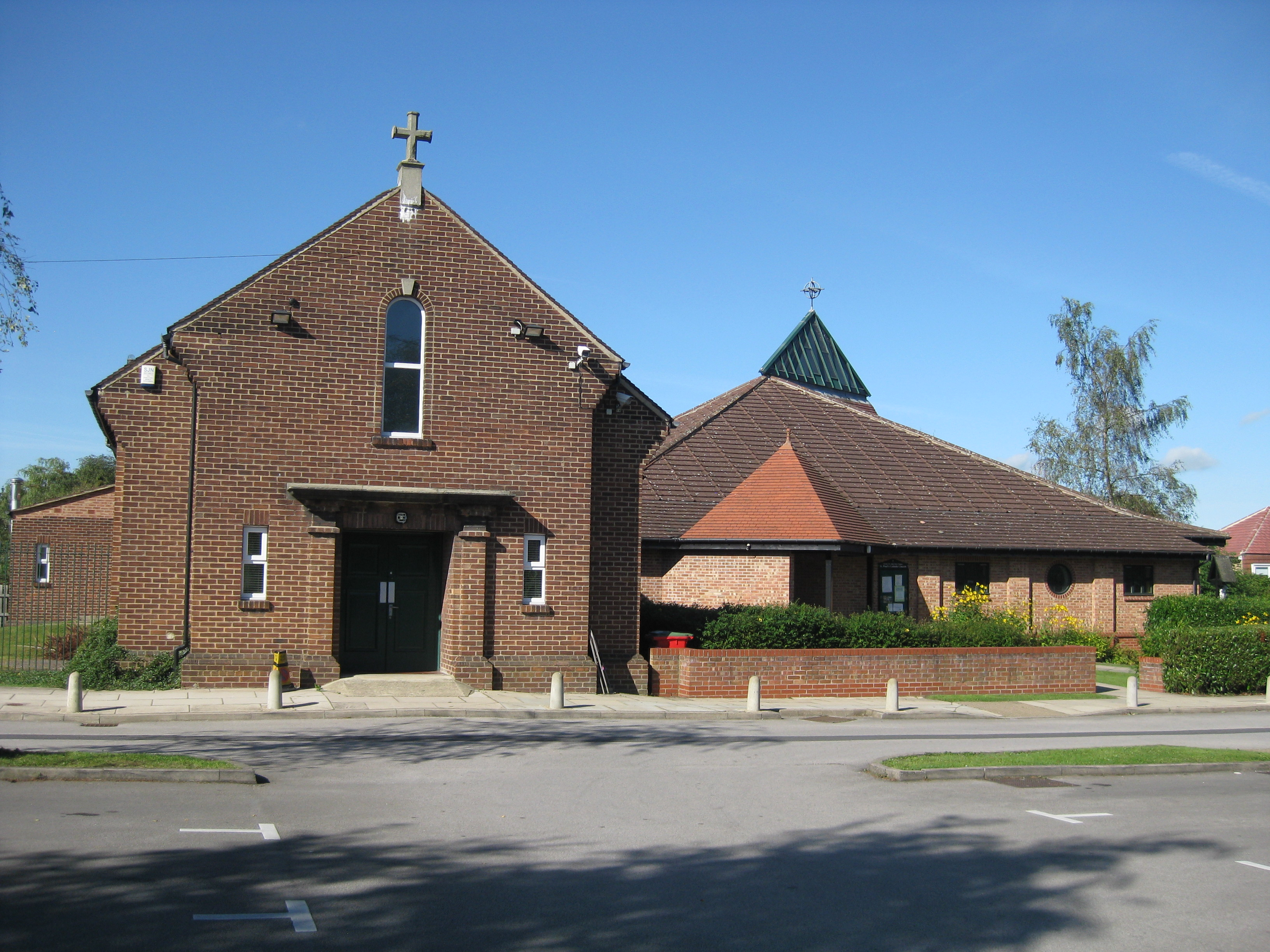
St Paul's Roman Catholic Church

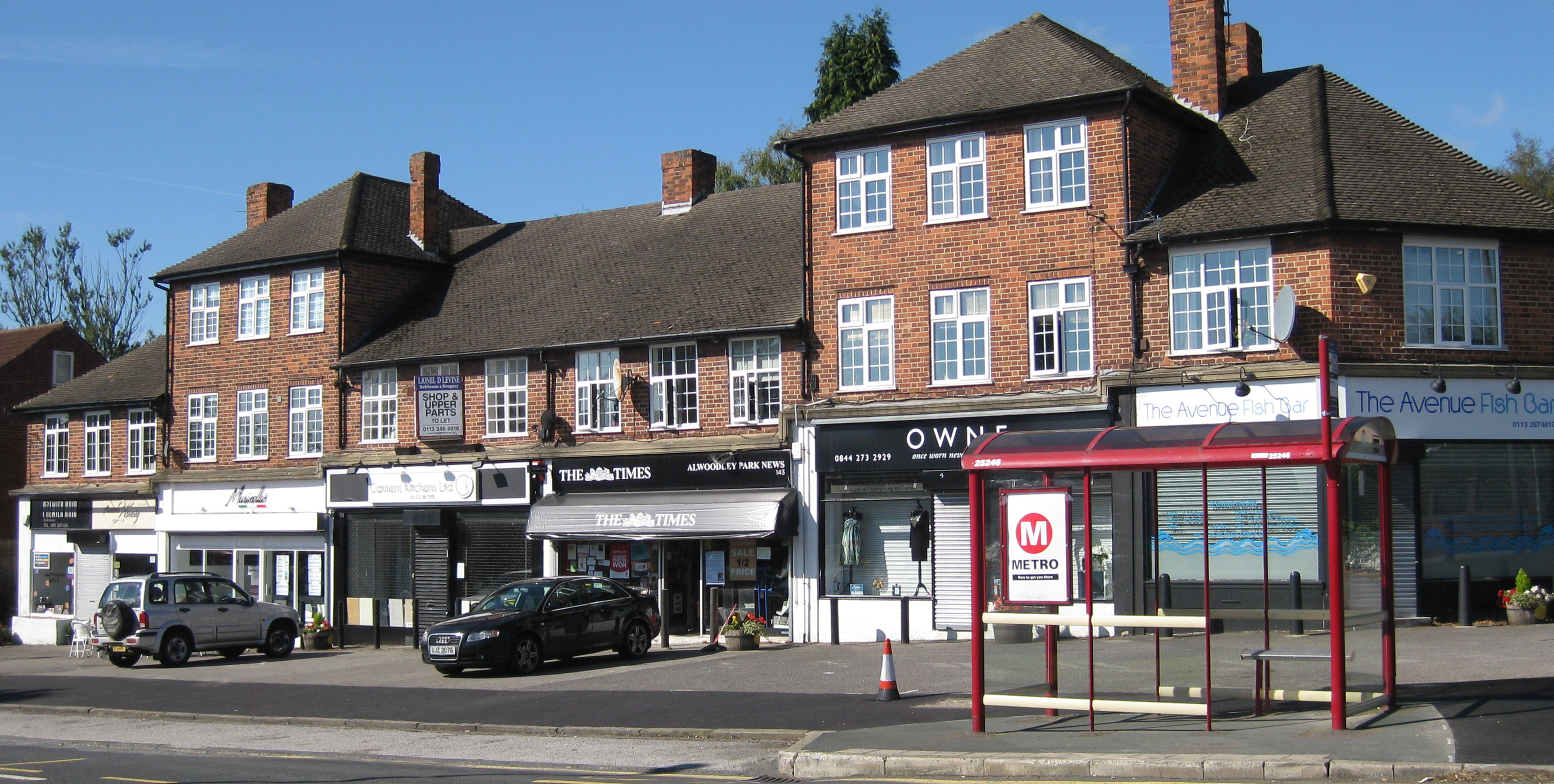
Shops on The Avenue

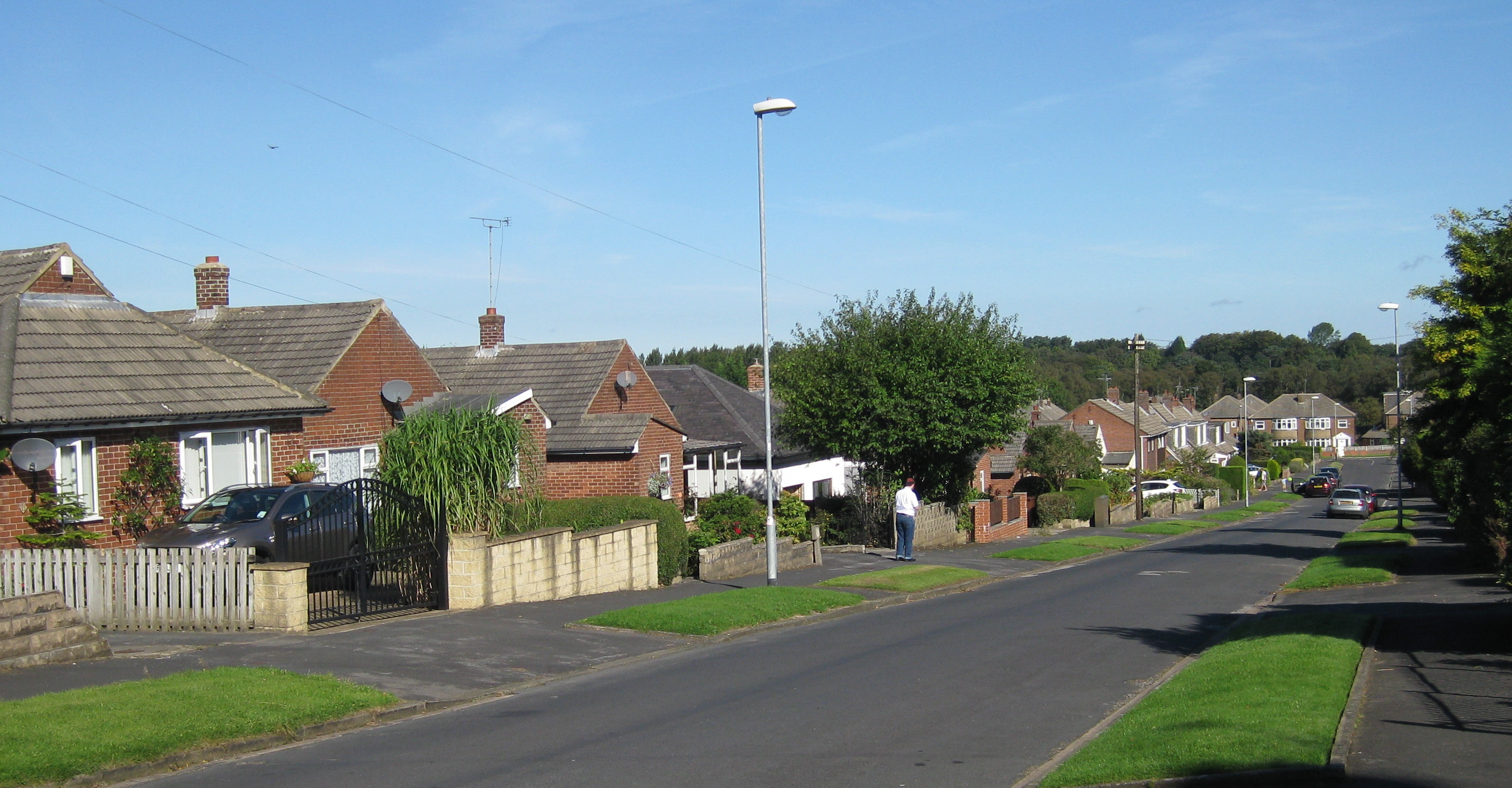
Primley Park Grove

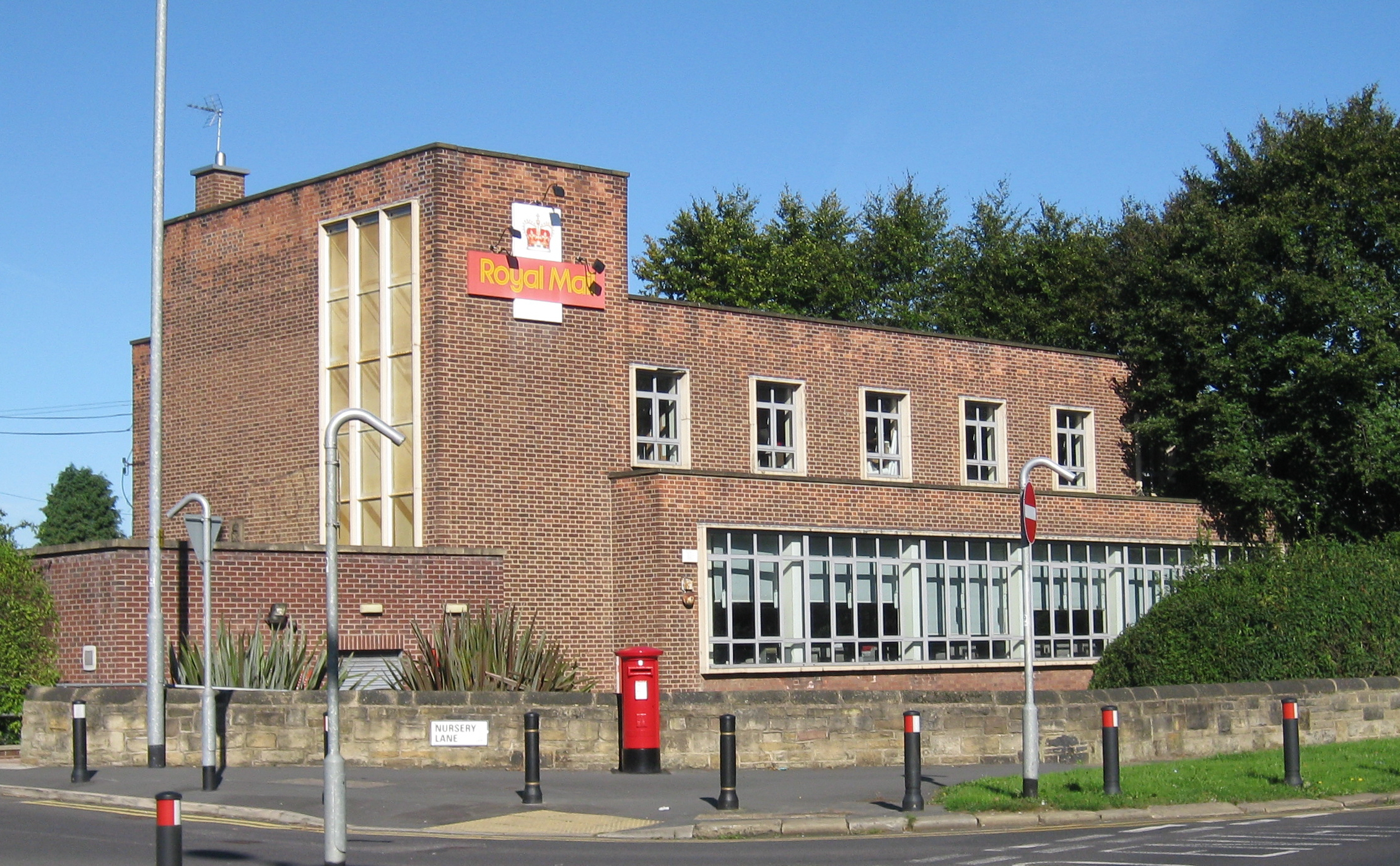
Royal Mail Delivery Office, Nursery Lane

== See also ==
- Listed buildings in Alwoodley
