= Helen Williams (British civil servant) =

Helen Mary Williams CB (born 30 June 1950) is a British civil servant and Director of School Curriculum and Pupil Well-being at the Department for Children, Schools and Families.

Born to Graham Myatt and Mary Harrison she was educated at Allerton High School in Leeds before matriculating to St Hilda's College, Oxford, where she gained an honours degree in Modern History. She began work for the Department for Education and Skills in 1972, and between 1984 and 1993 worked as an Assistant Secretary in the Department for Education dealing with Research Council funding. From 1993 to 1998 she was on loan from the Department for Education working for the Office of Science and Technology, reporting to first William Stewart and then to Sir John Cadogan. In 1999 she returned to the Department for Education, now the Department for Education and Employment, and became Director of School Organisation and Funding. In 2002 she became Director of Primary Education and e-learning, and in 2004 she was made Co-Director of School Standards before being promoted to Director of School Curriculum and Pupil Well-being in 2006. She was made a Companion of the Bath in the 2006 New Year Honours.

== Personal life ==
Her first marriage was to Ian Vaughan Williams in 1975; the marriage ended in a divorce in 1982. She remarried in 1993 to David Forrester, another civil servant, with whom she has two children, one son and one daughter.
