= East and West Yorkshire Union Railways =

English railway company

The East and West Yorkshire Union Railways (E&WYUR) was promoted in 1883 to connect the Hull and Barnsley Railway at Drax with Leeds. The company was unable to raise the money it needed to build the line, and it substantially reduced its scope to connecting collieries around Rothwell with the existing main line network nearby. This was successful, with trains running from 1890, but the company decided it would find a way to connect to Leeds and operate a much truncated passenger service, from Rothwell. It sponsored the South Leeds Junction Railway (SLJR) to make a connection from Rothwell to the Midland Railway at Stourton; the SLJR was soon re-absorbed by the E&WYUR. The passenger service started on 4 January 1904 but it was a disastrous failure, and it was soon withdrawn from 1 October 1904.

The E&WYUR continued as a successful mineral railway, being taken into the London and North Eastern Railway at the grouping of the railways in 1923. The network closed in 1966 as the collieries had ceased operation.

== Background ==
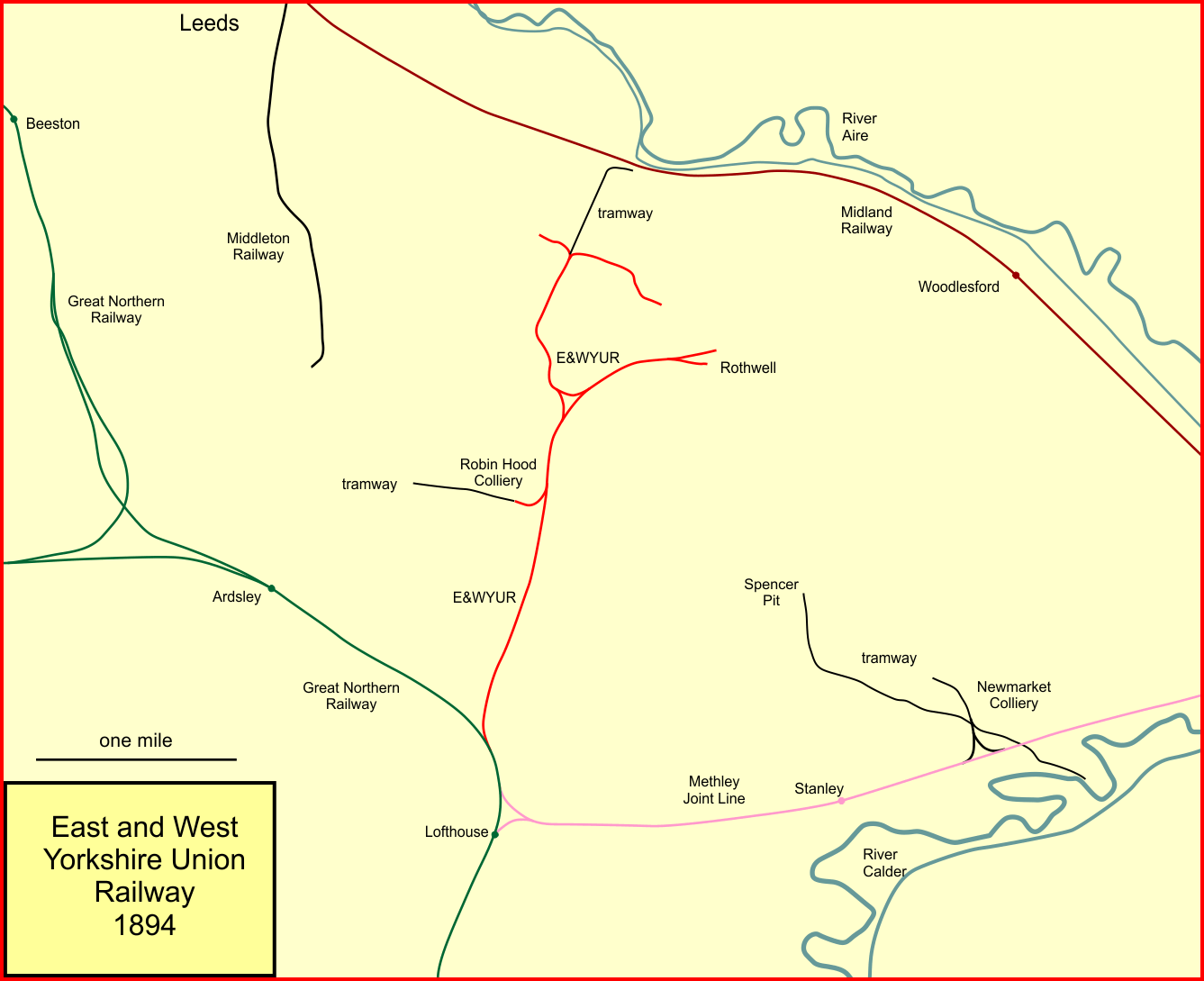
The E&WYUR network in 1894

In the last quarter of the nineteenth century there was a considerable upsurge in the coal industry in Yorkshire. At the same time there was dissatisfaction with the facilities provided by the established railway companies, and indeed with their charges. From the railways' point of view, huge capital investment in rolling stock and in infrastructure was being called for at a time when money was limited.

The Hull and Barnsley Railway (H&BR) was authorised by the Hull, Barnsley and West Riding Junction Railway and Dock Act 1880 (43 & 44 Vict. c. cxcix) of 26 August 1880 with the principal object of providing a direct link for mineral traffic from West Yorkshire coalfields to the Port of Hull; the project was partly motivated by resentment at the monopoly of the North Eastern Railway in serving Hull. The parliamentary bill for the H&BR had asked for wide-ranging running powers over existing railways to Sheffield, Leeds, Bradford, Huddersfield, Halifax, Manchester and Liverpool, but these had all been struck out when the act received royal assent. The line was a considerable engineering project at this time, and as work progressed, it became obvious that the company was unable to raise the money it needed, and in fact it never completed its network.

== E&WYUR promoted ==
The H&BR thought it essential to get access to Leeds for passenger traffic from Hull, and it encouraged promotion of a line from Drax, on its own main line, to Ardsley on the Great Northern Railway. The line was to cross the Midland Railway at Woodlesford and make a connection there, and also connect a colliery network at Rothwell, four miles south-east of Leeds. At Ardsley, it was hoped, running powers over the Great Northern Railway would be granted to Leeds and Bradford. The Woodlesford connection would allow for an alternative route to Leeds. Rothwell was the focus of a group of collieries owned by Henry Charlesworth of J & J Charlesworth & Co Limited; high quality stone was quarried locally as well. The Charlesworth group of collieries had connections to railways, but there was considerable attraction for them in a new direct railway to Hull docks.

East and West Yorkshire Union Railways Act 1883
- Act of Parliament
- Parliament of the United Kingdom
- Long title: An Act for incorporating the East and West Yorkshire Union Railways Company and for other purposes.
- Citation: 46 & 47 Vict. c. clxvi

Dates
- Royal assent: 2 August 1883

Text of statute as originally enacted

The result was the East and West Yorkshire Union Railways Act 1883 (46 & 47 Vict. c. clxvi) on 2 August 1883 which authorised for the East and West Yorkshire Union Railway. The hoped-for running powers over the Midland Railway and the Great Northern Railway (GNR) were refused. The main line from Drax was an ambitious project of about 30 miles of railway across difficult terrain. The E&WYUR soon found that raising the considerable capital sum for its main line was impossible, and in 1886 it got an abandonment act, the East and West Yorkshire Union Railways Act 1886 (49 & 50 Vict. c. lxxxi). The intended line to Drax was to be abandoned, but short branch lines to Lofthouse (near Ardsley) on the GNR and Woodlesford on the Midland Railway were added (or modified), so that the proposed network was about nine miles in extent including siding complexes. Running powers from Lofthouse to Leeds Central over the GNR were requested—passenger operation was still contemplated on the abbreviated system—but these were refused.

== Opening of a limited network ==
By November 1890 the line was nearly ready at the Ardsley end, so that some coal could come from the Rothwell collieries over the E&WYUR onto the GNR. However, there was a dispute with the GNR over the junction, and it was only resolved when the GNR were given running powers on the E&WYUR. On 19 May 1891 the line was fully open as far as Rothwell. Robin Hood Colliery was a collection point for other collieries, and GNR engines worked to and from that point; the colliery engines moved the wagons beyond that point. Considerable volumes of coal were now brought to the GNR for onward transit.

Continuously short of money for construction purposes, the E&WYUR approached the GNR in February 1892, asking it to take it over. The GNR board was willing to consider this, but was cautious about the financial commitment it would be making, and referred the matter to a sub-committee. The issue became complicated: at this time Hunslet had become a major industrial and commercial growth area, and business interests put forward a new line to the north of the E&WYUR, from Beeston to Hunslet; this group approached the GNR for support. At the same time the E&WYUR proposed an extension of its own line to Hunslet, which was to be called the South Leeds Junction Railway. The GNR considered its position on these conflicting proposals, and decided that the line from Beeston would be better, being more direct and involving less property demolition. That line became the Hunslet Railway, opened in 1899 by the Great Northern Railway. In May 1892, takeover negotiations between the GNR and the E&WYUR broke down, as the E&WYUR wanted 4% on its share capital, a demand the GNR would not meet. The Beeston to Hunslet scheme proceeded separately, and had no further connection with the E&WYUR.

== Situation in 1900 ==
An article in The Railway Magazine in August 1900 describes some contemporary features:

The situation of the railway made it a rather costly line to construct, the capital expenditure being up to the present time about £250,000... The Capital expenditure includes the many yards and sidings, the extent of which nearly equals the mileage of the railway. The principal traffic... is coal and stone. The traffic is derived from seven collieries and a number of quarries working the well known Robin Hood stone, which is sent all over England for window sills and stone work of that description... The railway is in a very flourishing condition financially, having paid 1 per cent dividend on its ordinary stock for several years past...

== South Leeds Junction Railway ==
South Leeds Junction Railway Act 1893
- Act of Parliament
- Parliament of the United Kingdom
- Long title: An Act for incorporating the South Leeds Junction Railway Company and for other purposes.
- Citation: 56 & 57 Vict. c. ccxix

Dates
- Royal assent: 24 August 1893

Text of statute as originally enacted

East and West Yorkshire Union Railways (South Leeds Junction Railway Transfer) Act 1896
- Act of Parliament
- Parliament of the United Kingdom
- Long title: An Act for vesting the undertaking of the South Leeds Junction Railway Company in the East and West Yorkshire Union Railways Company and for other purposes.
- Citation: 59 & 60 Vict. c. xlii

Dates
- Royal assent: 2 July 1896

Text of statute as originally enacted

The E&WYUR proposal for the South Leeds Junction Railway was authorised by the South Leeds Junction Railway Act 1893 (56 & 57 Vict. c. ccxix) on 24 August 1893, but in a much-modified form: it was to be a two-mile line from Rothwell to sidings at Stourton, two miles west of Woodlesford, alongside the Midland Railway line. This connected in more collieries, and it opened on 6 April 1895. Considerable volumes of coal came to the GNR off the line. The South Leeds Junction Railway was worked by the E&WYUR, and it was acquired by the East and West Yorkshire Union Railways Company by the East and West Yorkshire Union Railways (South Leeds Junction Railway Transfer) Act 1896 (59 & 60 Vict. c. xlii) of 2 July 1896.

== Branches ==
A further branch was authorised on 14 December 1897 from Robin Hood to Royds Green Lower; it was authorised under the Light Railways Act 1896 (59 & 60 Vict. c. 48) by the East and West Yorkshire Union Light Railway Order 1897, only the second line to be treated in this way. A third branch was the Thorpe Branch, which was built in 1899. The final result was a railway that had numerous small branches serving collieries in a small area. A short extension was opened on 1 November 1903 from Stourton to Stourton Junction on the Midland Railway, providing a running line connection.

== Passenger trains ==
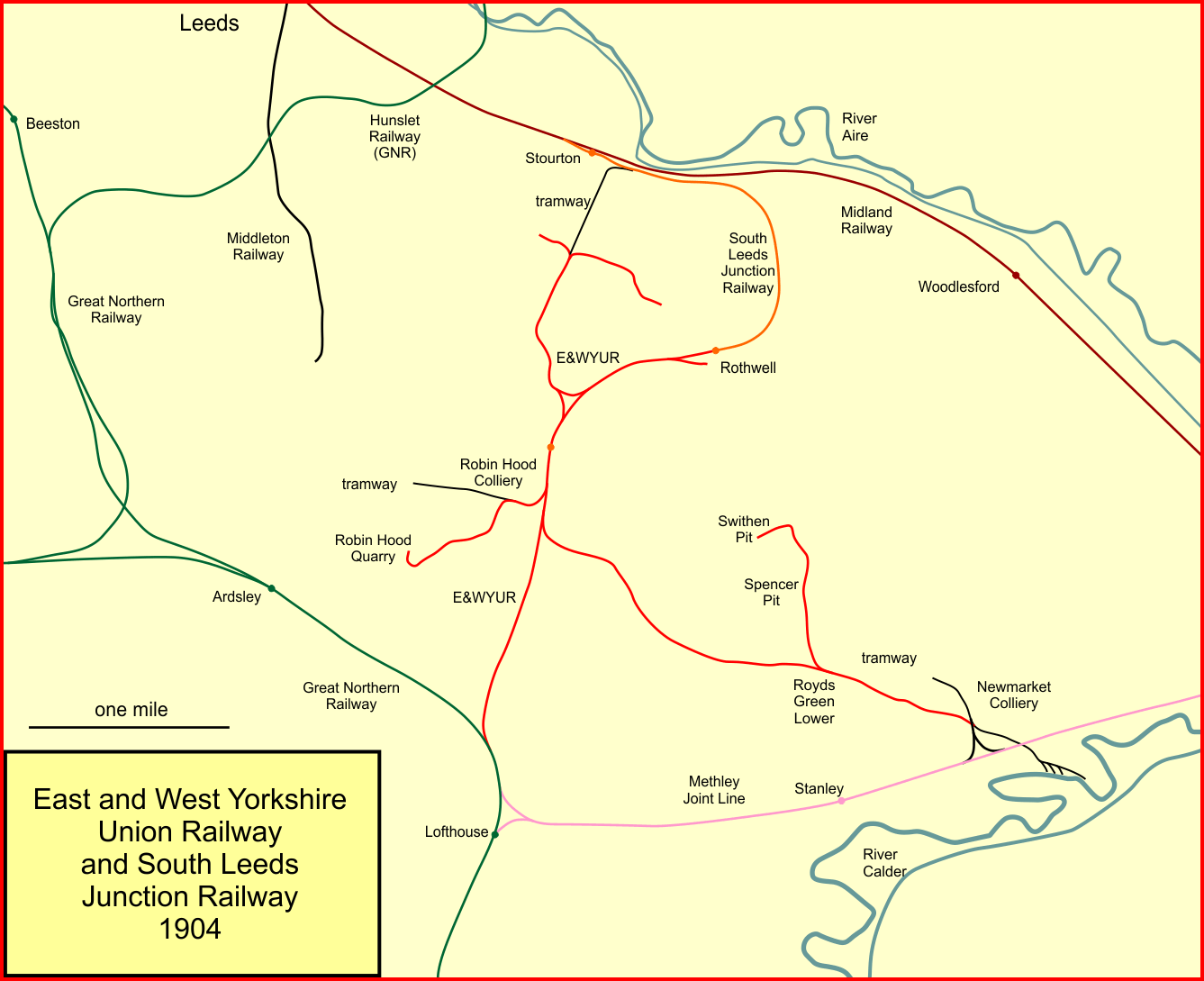
The E&WYUR network in 1904

Workmen's services were operated on a branch from Robin Hood to Royds Green Lower, sanctioned by the light railway order, and opened by 1898.

A light railway order made on 7 June 1901 permitted the company to operate its main line as a light railway and build a new branch alongside the Pontefract-Leeds road as far as the tramway terminus at Thwaite Gate (at this stage not making a junction with the Midland Railway). The intention was to operate a passenger service in connection with the trams, but this scheme was abandoned when work started on a conventional street tramway linking Wakefield and Leeds via Stourton, with a branch to Robin Hood. Undaunted, the E&WYUR decided to compete directly with the trams and on 4 January 1904 introduced a passenger service between Robin Hood and Leeds Wellington station. It was a disastrous failure, losing £200 per month; Sunday services were withdrawn in August 1904, and the entire service was withdrawn from 1 October of the same year, only six weeks after the opening of the rival tram route.

Suggitt remarks:

The provision... of a separate passenger service on the E&WYUR made little sense. Horse drawn wagonettes already ran to Leeds and a scheme for electric trams to Wakefield had been approved in 1902. [To enable passenger operation,] a junction with the Midland main line at Stourton had to be built, the SLJR section of track doubled, modern signalling installed, and platforms built at the three stations of Robin Hood, Rothwell and Stourton.

== Operating methods ==
The E&WYUR had an unusual operating system: no block working was used, and only the Royds Green Lower Branch used a staff and ticket method. All train movements had to be made on a siding basis, driving at sight. Proper signalling had to be provided for the passenger service. The article printed in The Railway Magazine in 1900 includes the observation that "Although the railway is worked as a single line, a large portion of it is already doubled".

== The residual E&WUYR ==
The E&WYUR had been constructed as a domestic Charlesworth network, and only limited attempts had been made to document land ownership. In a number of cases E&WYUR lines were built on Charlesworth property; the company had purchased land from Charlesworths in 1899, but Charlesworths retained certain reservations. For some time this did not matter, but the LNER later found that it was a problematic issue.

The E&WYUR remained independent until the Grouping of the railways in 1923, when it was taken over by the London and North Eastern Railway.

== After 1923 ==
The E&WYUR lines were all closed by 3 October 1966, the line east of Rothwell had been dormant since February 1962.

== Station list ==
- Robin Hood
- Rothwell
- Stourton

== Current Condition ==
The lines are now repurposed as the "Rothwell Greenway".

== Sources ==
- Donald J Grant, Directory of the Railway Companies of Great Britain, Matador Publishers, Kibworth Beauchamp, 2017, ISBN 978 1785893 537
- David Joy, A Regional History of the Railways of Great Britain: volume VIII: South and West Yorkshire, David & Charles, Newton Abbot, 1984, ISBN 0 946537 11 9
- Gordon Suggitt, Lost Railways of South and West Yorkshire, Countryside Books, Newbury, 2007, ISBN 978 1 84674 043 5
- John Wrottesley, The Great Northern Railway: volume II: Expansion and Competition, B T Batsford Limited, London, 1979, ISBN 0 7134 1592 4
- John Wrottesley, The Great Northern Railway: volume III: Twentieth Century to Grouping, B T Batsford Limited, London, 1981, ISBN 0 7134 2183 5
