= Hunslet (disambiguation) =

Hunslet may refer to:

Places

- Hunslet, an area in Leeds, UK
- Hunslet Rural District

Rail transport

- Hunslet-Barclay, former name of merged group of locomotive manufacturing companies - now split into Brush-Barclay and Hunslet Engine Company
- Hunslet Engine Company, a locomotive manufacturer.
  - Hunslet Steam Company, a subsidiary
- Leeds Hunslet Lane railway station
- Hunslet Austerity 0-6-0ST, a steam shunting locomotive
- NIR 101 Class, nicknamed Hunslets

Other

- Hunslet F.C. (1883), a rugby league club disbanded in 1973
- Hunslet R.L.F.C., a rugby league club formed in 1973 as New Hunslet, and known as Hunslet Hawks between the mid-1990s and 2016
