= Rothwell (Leeds City Council ward) =

Electoral ward in Leeds, England

- Rothwell highlighted within Leeds
- Population: 15,821 (2023 electorate)
- Metropolitan borough: City of Leeds
- Metropolitan county: West Yorkshire
- Region: Yorkshire and the Humber
- Country: England
- Sovereign state: United Kingdom
- UK Parliament: Wakefield and Rothwell
- Councillors: Diane Chapman (Liberal Democrats); Stewart Golton (Liberal Democrats); Conrad Hart-Brooke (Liberal Democrats)

Rothwell is an electoral ward of Leeds City Council in south east Leeds, West Yorkshire, including the town of the same name and the villages of Carlton, Oulton and Woodlesford.

== Councillors ==
Election	Councillor	Councillor	Councillor
1973	Rose Lund (Lab)	A. Benson (Lab)	J. De Carieret (Lab)
1975	Rose Lund (Lab)	A. Benson (Lab)	S. Arran (Lab)
1976	Rose Lund (Lab)	A. Benson (Lab)	S. Arran (Lab)
1978	Rose Lund (Lab)	A. Benson (Lab)	S. Arran (Lab)
1979	Rose Lund (Lab)	A. Benson (Lab)	Brian Walker (Lab)
1980	Rose Lund (Lab)	Alec Hudson (Lab)	Brian Walker (Lab)
1982	Rose Lund (Lab)	Alec Hudson (Lab)	Brian Walker (Lab)
1983	Rose Lund (Lab)	Alec Hudson (Lab)	Brian Walker (Lab)
1984	Rose Lund (Lab)	Alec Hudson (Lab)	Brian Walker (Lab)
1986	Rose Lund (Lab)	Alec Hudson (Lab)	Brian Walker (Lab)
1987	Rose Lund (Lab)	Alec Hudson (Lab)	Brian Walker (Lab)
1988	Rose Lund (Lab)	Alec Hudson (Lab)	Brian Walker (Lab)
1990	Rose Lund (Lab)	Alec Hudson (Lab)	Brian Walker (Lab)
1991	Rose Lund (Lab)	Alec Hudson (Lab)	Brian Walker (Lab)
1992	Rose Lund (Lab)	Alec Hudson (Lab)	Brian Walker (Lab)
1994	Rose Lund (Lab)	Alec Hudson (Lab)	Brian Walker (Lab)
1995	Rose Lund (Lab)	Alec Hudson (Lab)	Brian Walker (Lab)
1996	Lorna Cohen (Lab) (Note: Cohen had been a councillor for Burley from 1978 to 1980 and Harehills ward from 1980 to 1996.)	Alec Hudson (Lab)	Brian Walker (Lab)
1998	Lorna Cohen (Lab)	Alec Hudson (Lab)	Brian Walker (Lab)
1999	Lorna Cohen (Lab)	Alec Hudson (Lab)	Brian Walker (Lab)
2000	Donald Wilson (LD)	Alec Hudson (Lab)	Brian Walker (Lab)
2002	Donald Wilson (LD)	Keith Willey (LD)	Brian Walker (Lab)
2003	Donald Wilson (LD)	Keith Willey (LD)	Steve Smith (LD)
2004	Donald Wilson (LD)	Mitchell Galdas (LD)	Steve Smith (LD)
2006	Donald Wilson (LD)	Stewart Golton (LD) (Note: Golton had previously been a councillor for Weetwood ward from 1998 to 2006.)	Steve Smith (LD)
2007	Donald Wilson (LD)	Stewart Golton (LD)	Steve Smith (LD)
2008	Donald Wilson (LD)	Stewart Golton (LD)	Steve Smith (LD)
2010	Donald Wilson (LD)	Stewart Golton (LD)	Steve Smith (LD)
2011	Donald Wilson (LD)	Stewart Golton (LD)	Karen Bruce (Lab) (Note: Bruce had previously been a Garforth and Swillington ward councillor from 1998 until losing her seat at the 2004 election.)
2012	David Nagle (Lab)	Stewart Golton (LD)	Karen Bruce (Lab)
2014	David Nagle (Lab)	Stewart Golton (LD)	Karen Bruce (Lab)
2015	David Nagle (Lab)	Stewart Golton (LD)	Karen Bruce (Lab)
2016	David Nagle (Lab)	Stewart Golton (LD)	Karen Bruce (Lab)
2018	Carmel Harrison (LD)	Stewart Golton (LD)	Karen Bruce (Lab)
2019	Carmel Harrison (LD) (Note: Following the 2019 election, Harrison changed her surname to Hall.)	Stewart Golton (LD)	Diane Chapman (LD)
July 2020	Vacant (Note: Carmel Hall died in office in July 2020. No by-election was required as her term of office was to end and her successor to be elected on 6 May 2021 at the next council election as, in accordance with UK government regulations in response to the COVID-19 pandemic, it would have been scheduled for the same date.)	Stewart Golton (LD)	Diane Chapman (LD)
2021	Conrad Hart-Brooke (LD)	Stewart Golton (LD)	Diane Chapman (LD)
2022	Conrad Hart-Brooke (LD)	Stewart Golton (LD)	Diane Chapman (LD)
2023	Conrad Hart-Brooke (LD)	Stewart Golton (LD)	Diane Chapman (LD)
2024	Conrad Hart-Brooke (LD)	Stewart Golton (LD)	Diane Chapman (LD)
2026	Conrad Hart-Brooke* (LD)	Stewart Golton* (LD)	Diane Chapman* (LD)

indicates seat up for re-election. indicates councillor vacancy. * indicates incumbent councillor.

== Elections since 2010 ==
=== May 2026 ===
2026
Party	Candidate	Votes	%	±%
Liberal Democrats	Stewart Golton*	3,772	52.5	▼9.6
Reform	Lindon Dove	1,929	26.9	New
Green	Mikey Sykes	638	8.9	▲5.6
Labour	Archie Sykes	495	6.9	▼15.1
Conservative	Stewart Peter Harper	293	4.1	▼1.9
SDP	Mark Daniels	52	0.7	▼0.1
Turnout			45.3	
Rejected ballots		10		
Registered electors		15,859		
Liberal Democrats hold		Swing		

=== May 2024 ===
2024
Party	Candidate	Votes	%	±%
Liberal Democrats	Conrad Hart-Brooke*	3,540	62.1	+0.7
Labour Co-op	Timothy Dowd	1,253	22.0	+0.4
Conservative	Louisa Singh	340	6.0	−0.7
Yorkshire	Sean McDonald	329	5.8	+0.9
Green	Allen Sikoryn	193	3.3	−1.4
SDP	Sarah Welbourne	43	0.8	+0.4
Majority		2,287	40.1	+0.3
Turnout		5,731	36.7	+1.6
Liberal Democrats hold		Swing	+0.2	

=== May 2023 ===
2023
Party	Candidate	Votes	%	±%
Liberal Democrats	Diane Chapman*	3,409	61.4	+7.1
Labour	James Driver	1,200	21.6	−6.9
Conservative	Babatunde Gbolade	372	6.7	−5.4
Yorkshire	Sean McDonald	274	4.9	+2.1
Green	Tim Moorson	260	4.7	+2.5
SDP	Sarah Welbourne	21	0.4	N/A
Majority		2,209	39.8	+14.0
Turnout		5,552	35.1	−3.0
Liberal Democrats hold		Swing		

=== May 2022 ===
2022
Party	Candidate	Votes	%	±%
Liberal Democrats	Stewart Golton*	3,304	54.3	+19.9
Labour	Karen Bruce	1,735	28.5	−4.4
Conservative	Joe Boycott	737	12.1	−10.9
Yorkshire	Sean McDonald	168	2.8	−2.5
Green	Ali Aliremzioglu	137	2.2	−1.3
Majority		1,569	25.8	+24.3
Turnout		6,090	38.1	−3.6
Liberal Democrats hold		Swing		

=== May 2021 ===
2021
Party	Candidate	Votes	%	±%
Liberal Democrats	Conrad Hart-Brooke	2,313	34.4	−7.6
Labour	Karen Bruce	2,212	32.9	+0.0
Conservative	Joe Boycott	1,543	23.0	+11.1
Yorkshire	Sean McDonald	359	5.3	N/A
Green	Ali Aliremzioglu	235	3.5	−2.0
SDP	Christopher Dudley	16	0.0	N/A
Majority		101	1.5	−7.6
Turnout		6,716	41.7	+8.6
Liberal Democrats hold		Swing		

=== May 2019 ===
2019
Party	Candidate	Votes	%	±%
Liberal Democrats	Diane Chapman	2,206	42.0	−2.6
Labour	Karen Bruce*	1,731	32.9	+0.2
Conservative	Joe Boycott	623	11.9	−5.7
For Britain	Simon Michael Crowe	409	7.8	+7.8
Green	Ali Aliremzioglu	288	5.5	+0.5
Majority		475	9.1	−4.5
Turnout		5,306	33.1	−4.6
Liberal Democrats gain from Labour		Swing	-1.4	

=== May 2018 ===
2018
Party	Candidate	Votes	%	±%
Liberal Democrats	Stewart Golton*	3,167	44.6	+14.5
Liberal Democrats	Carmel Harrison	2,338		
Labour	Karen Bruce*	2,326	32.7	−3.6
Liberal Democrats	Patricia Yates	2,157		
Labour	David Nagle*	1,857		
Labour	Sharon Burke	1,645		
Conservative	Joe Boycott	1,254	17.6	+1.4
Conservative	Melieha Long	855		
Conservative	Shazar Ahad	686		
Green	Ali Aliremzioglu	358	5.0	+2.4
Majority		841	13.6	+7.6
Turnout		6,071	37.7	+1.3
Liberal Democrats hold		Swing		
Liberal Democrats gain from Labour		Swing		
Labour hold		Swing		

=== May 2016 ===
2016
Party	Candidate	Votes	%	±%
Labour	David Nagle*	2,026	36.1	−2.5
Liberal Democrats	Carmel Harrison	1,728	30.1	+10.5
Conservative	Steve Ellis	912	16.2	−8.7
UKIP	David Daniel	750	13.3	±0
Green	Emma Dobson	203	3.6	−0.1
Majority		298	6.0	−7.7
Turnout		5,619	36.4	
Labour hold		Swing		

=== May 2015 ===
2015
Party	Candidate	Votes	%	±%
Labour	Karen Bruce*	4,206	38.6	−7.5
Conservative	Steve Ellis	2,715	24.9	+8.7
Liberal Democrats	Ben Ward	2,133	19.6	−18.1
UKIP	Paul Spivey	1,447	13.3	+13.3
Green	Stephen Paul Terry	408	3.7	+3.7
Majority		1,491	13.7	+5.3
Turnout		10,909	68.7	
Labour hold		Swing	-8.1	

=== May 2014 ===
2014
Party	Candidate	Votes	%	±%
Liberal Democrats	Stewart Golton*	2,429		
Labour	Angela Kellett	2,018		
Conservative	Stephen Ellis	723		
Green	Gordon Haycock	385		
Majority		411		
Turnout			36.04	
Liberal Democrats hold		Swing		

=== May 2012 ===
2012
Party	Candidate	Votes	%	±%
Labour	David Nagle	2,564	47.7	+1.6
Liberal Democrats	Don Wilson*	1,926	35.8	−1.9
Conservative	Daniel Farrell	399	7.4	−8.8
UKIP	David Daniel	366	6.8	+6.8
English Democrat	Bernie Allen	120	2.2	+2.2
Majority		638	11.9	+3.5
Turnout		5,375		
Labour gain from Liberal Democrats		Swing	+1.7	

=== May 2011 ===
2011
Party	Candidate	Votes	%	±%
Labour	Karen Bruce	2,889	46.1	+10.1
Liberal Democrats	Steve Smith*	2,365	37.7	+0.0
Conservative	Louise Turner	1,018	16.2	−3.1
Majority		524	8.4	+6.7
Turnout		6,272	40	
Labour gain from Liberal Democrats		Swing	+5.0	

=== May 2010 ===
2010
Party	Candidate	Votes	%	±%
Liberal Democrats	Stewart Golton*	3,938	37.7	−5.9
Labour	Alec Hudson	3,756	35.9	+2.4
Conservative	Caroline Oldfield	2,018	19.3	+7.2
BNP	Robert Peel	736	7.0	−3.7
Majority		182	1.7	−8.3
Turnout		10,448	67.1	+29.5
Liberal Democrats hold		Swing	-4.1	

== See also ==
- Listed buildings in Rothwell, West Yorkshire
