= Beeston Junction–Hunslet Goods railway =

The Beeston Junction–Hunslet Goods railway was a goods railway line in Leeds, West Yorkshire, England, promoted as the Hunslet Railway. It connected the Great Northern Railway main line with a new Hunslet goods yard, on the east side of Leeds. It opened in 1899, and was a successful expansion of goods facilities for the GNR.

It closed in 1967.

== History ==
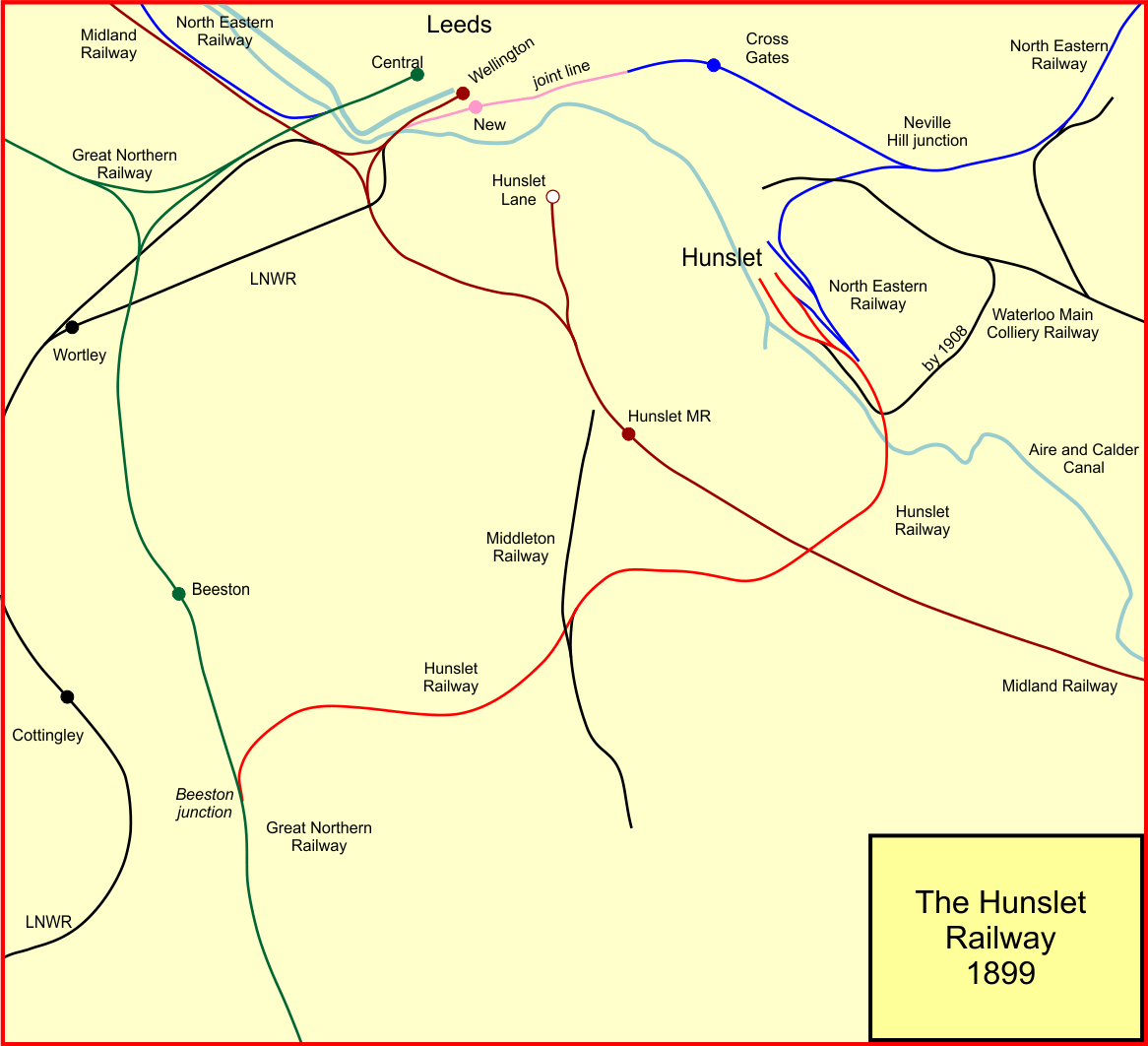
Map of the Hunslet Railway and surrounding lines (1899)

In the last two decades of the nineteenth century, Hunslet had become a thriving manufacturing suburb of Leeds. Influential local business people proposed a railway branch serving the district, and in 1892 they approached the Great Northern Railway to see if the GNR would build a line. The GNR was favourably disposed to the idea, but the issue became complicated. The East and West Yorkshire Union Railways, an independent colliery line in the Rothwell area, was negotiating with the GNR at the time with a view to selling its concern to the GNR. The GNR was sceptical, unwilling to pay the price demanded by the E&WYUR. Possibly as a tactical ploy, the E&WYUR said it would build its own branch from its own network to Hunslet.

The discussions between the E&WYUR and the GNR broke down, and the smaller company did not proceed with its Hunslet branch. The field was clear for the GNR and the local promoters. Carter and Ramsden among the promoters sent the GNR firm details of their proposal in December 1892, a parliamentary bill having been prepared; the line would leave the GNR at Beeston.

Hunslet Railway Act 1893
- Act of Parliament
- Parliament of the United Kingdom
- Long title: An Act for making a Railway from the West Yorkshire Railway of the Great Northern Railway Company at Beeston to Leeds and Hunslet with a Bridge over the River Aire between Leeds and Hunslet and for other purposes.
- Citation: 56 & 57 Vict. c. cli

Dates
- Royal assent: 27 July 1893

Text of statute as originally enacted

The Hunslet Railway Act 1893 (56 & 57 Vict. c. cli) passed in Parliament on 27 July 1893, and the Hunslet Railway was authorised, with share capital of £360,000. In December 1893 the GNR agreed to construct the line, and to deposit a bill in the next session to absorb the company. The Great Northern Railway Act 1894 (57 & 58 Vict. c. lxxv) passed, receiving royal assent on 3 July 1894. The route would cross the Aire and Calder Navigation. There were proposals to widen and deepen the canal so as to bring ships into Leeds, and a swing bridge over the navigation was provided for the purpose.

The GNR delayed construction, as it was in some financial difficulty at the time. During the period of dormancy, the North Eastern Railway announced in May 1896 that it proposed to build a Hunslet branch, approaching Hunslet from the north. The GNR and the NER investigated whether costs savings could be made by co-operation, but these could only be in the terminal area as the two railways would approach from different alignments. The GNR secured an act of Parliament giving authority for an extension of time for the construction on 3 June 1897.

The line was opened for goods traffic on 3 July 1899; it never carried a passenger service. It was 4 1/2 miles long, (Note: Some sources quote a length of 3 3/4 miles, and refer to the line being built "to" the North Eastern Railway. These are misunderstandings. The line was built to GNR goods sheds at Hunslet. Between authorisation and construction, the NER built its own line to Hunslet, providing its own separate accommodation there. However there were exchange sidings, and the point of connection was at 3 3/4 miles so far as the GNR was concerned.) and it crossed the old Middleton Railway with a junction called Parkside. The Aire and Calder bridge had three large spans, of which the central span swung. There were exchange sidings with the NER branch from Neville Hill, which had been built in the meantime since the Hunslet Railway's own act, but there was no through running connection.

== General description ==
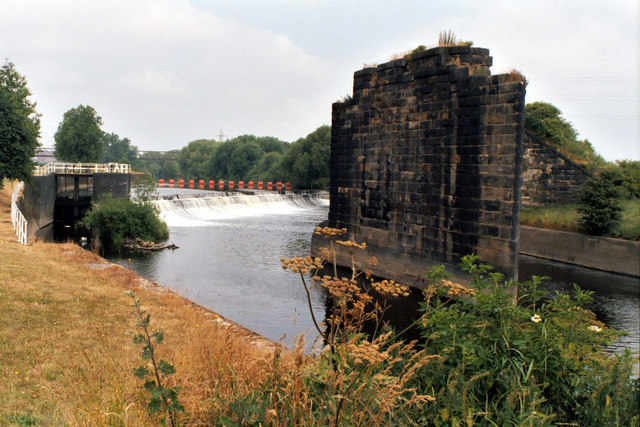
Remains of the bridge across the Aire

The Engineer (periodical) provided an extensive description of the works:

The station and sidings covered an area of 23 acres. There was a large warehouse with ten 30 cwt hydraulic cranes as well as a 30cwt and a three ton crane. The site was provided with 8,000 yards of sidings. the North Eastern Railway had constructed a short branch line from Neville Hill. The branch line was double track.

== Closure ==
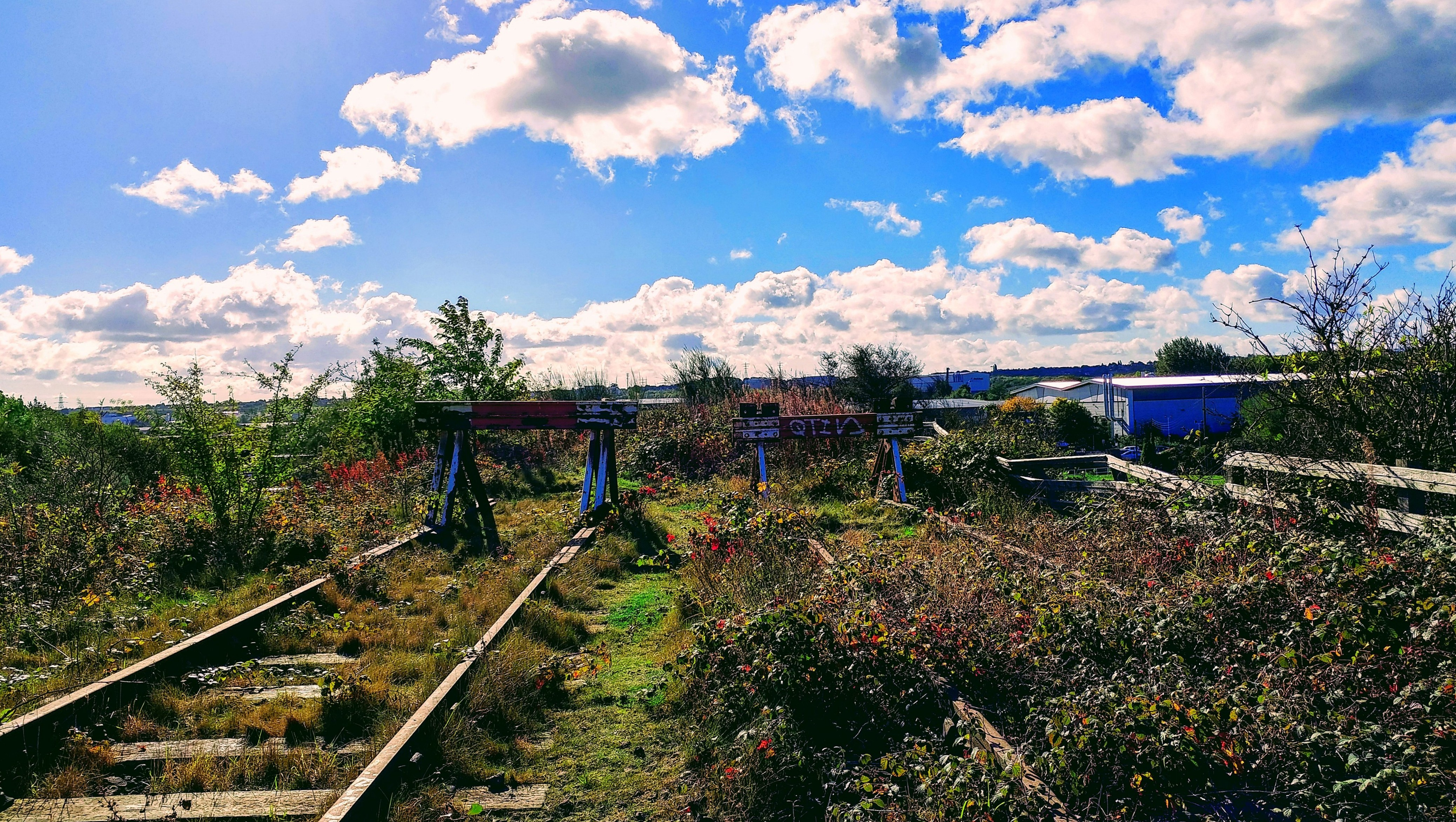
End of the line in Hunslet Goods yard (Tarmac stone terminal)

The section between Parkside Junction and Hunslet Goods closed on 3 January 1966, the remaining section from Beeston Junction to Parkside Junction closed on 3 July 1967. The swing bridge over the Aire and Calder Navigation was demolished in 1977.

== Remains ==
Hunslet Goods yard is (2019) used as a stone terminal for the Hanson company and is served from Neville Hill. South of the canal, the route of the line has been built over, and near Hunslet Carr about 0.75 miles (1.2 km) of its alignment is now used by the M621 motorway.

== Sources ==
- Christopher Awdry, Encyclopedia of British Railway Companies, Patrick Stephens Limited, Wellingborough, 1990, ISBN 1-85260-049-7
- Martin Bairstow, The Great Northern Railway in West Yorkshire, published by Wyvern Publications, Skipton, 1982, ISBN 0907941 036
- Ernest F. Carter, An Historical Geography of the Railways of the British Isles, Cassell, London, 1959
- Donald J. Grant, Directory of the Railway Companies of Great Britain, Matador Publishers, Kibworth Beauchamp, 2017, ISBN 978 1785893 537
- David Joy, A Regional History of the Railways of Great Britain: volume 8: South and West Yorkshire, David & Charles, Newton Abbot, 1984, ISBN 0 946537 11 9
- The Great Northern Railway: New Branch Line and Goods Station at Leeds, in The Engineer (periodical), Volume 88, 24 November 1899, pages 513 and 514
- John Wrottesley, The Great Northern Railway: volume III: Twentieth Century to Grouping, B T Batsford Limited, London, 1981, ISBN 0 7134 2183 5
