= Hunslet Rural District =

Former rural district of Yorkshire, England

Coordinates: 53.778°N 1.531°W

Hunslet
- Area
  - 1901: 6,400 acres (26 km^{2})
  - 1931: 1,178 acres (4.77 km^{2})
- Population
  - 1901: 6,730
  - 1931: 4,290
- History
  - Origin: Hunslet Rural Sanitary District
  - Created: 1894
  - Abolished: 1937
  - Succeeded by: Rothwell Urban District
- Status: Rural district
  - HQ: Hunslet

Hunslet was a rural district of the administrative county of Yorkshire, West Riding from 1894 to 1937.

The rural district was created by the Local Government Act 1894 as successor to the Hunslet Rural Sanitary District. It lay to the south of the county borough of Leeds, and initially consisted of four civil parishes:

- Middleton
- Oulton with Woodlesford
- Templenewsham
- Thorpe Stapleton

The council offices were in Hunslet within the county borough. In 1920 the area of the rural district was reduced when Middleton was included in the enlarged boundaries of Leeds. Five years later the parish of Thorpe Stapleton, with a population at the 1921 census of just 23, was absorbed by Templenewsham. In 1928 a further extension of the City of Leeds took in Templenewsham, leaving the rural district with the single parish of Oulton with Woodlesford.

The district was abolished in 1937 by a county review order, with its area included in an enlarged Rothwell Urban District.
