= Thorpe on the Hill =

Thorpe on the Hill may refer to:

- Thorpe on the Hill, Lincolnshire, England
- Thorpe on the Hill, West Yorkshire, England
