= Carlton, Rothwell =

Village in West Yorkshire, England

Coordinates: 53.740000°N 1.490200°W

Carlton
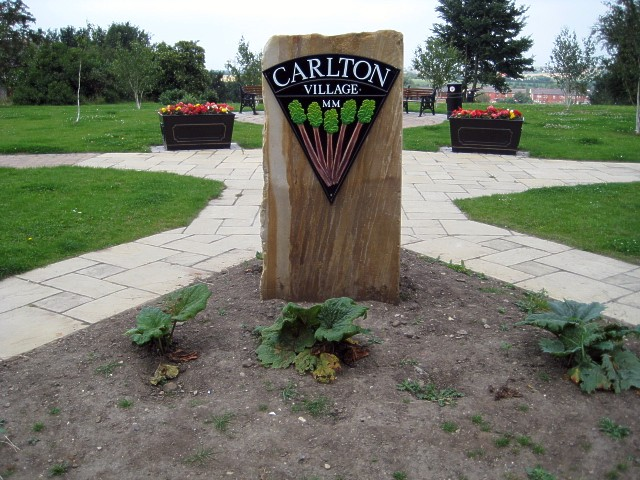
- Village sign showing rhubarb, with rhubarb plants in foreground

- Location within West Yorkshire
- OS grid reference: SE337271
- Metropolitan borough: City of Leeds
- Metropolitan county: West Yorkshire
- Region: Yorkshire and the Humber
- Country: England
- Sovereign state: United Kingdom
- Post town: WAKEFIELD
- Postcode district: WF3
- Dialling code: 0113
- Police: West Yorkshire
- Fire: West Yorkshire
- Ambulance: Yorkshire
- UK Parliament: Wakefield and Rothwell

Carlton is a village in the south of the City of Leeds metropolitan borough in West Yorkshire, England, about 6 miles (13 km) from Leeds city centre.

== Geography ==
Carlton has a Wakefield WF3 postal address.

Carlton was previously part of Rothwell Urban District. Today it sits in the Rothwell ward of Leeds City Council and Wakefield and Rothwell parliamentary constituency.

It is celebrated for its rhubarb growing, and is at the centre of the Rhubarb Triangle. Due to Carlton's rhubarb growing and farming heritage, the area has seen a recent influx of Eastern European migrants, who make a living working on the numerous farms.

== Etymology ==
The name of Carlton is first attested in the Domesday Book of 1086 as Carlentone. As with the nearby example of West Carlton and East Carlton in Yeadon, the name comes from the Old Norse word karla (genitive plural of karl 'commoner, churl') and the Old English word tūn ('estate'). Thus it once meant 'estate owned by commoners'. The Old Norse form karla may be based on an earlier Old English name *ceorla tūn, of the same meaning.

== Sport ==
Carlton is represented in Association Football by Carlton Athletic who play in the West Yorkshire Association Football League and share the facilities with Carlton Cricket Club.

== See also ==
- Listed buildings in Rothwell, West Yorkshire
