= Thorpe on the Hill, West Yorkshire =

Coordinates: 53.7331°N 1.5271°W

Thorpe on the Hill
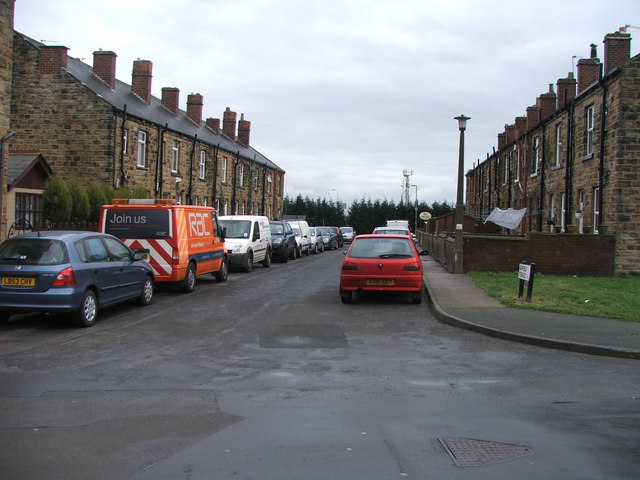
- Ashfield Terrace, Thorpe on the Hill

- Location within West Yorkshire
- Metropolitan borough: City of Leeds
- Metropolitan county: West Yorkshire
- Region: Yorkshire and the Humber
- Country: England
- Sovereign state: United Kingdom
- Post town: WAKEFIELD
- Postcode district: WF3
- Dialling code: 01924
- Police: West Yorkshire
- Fire: West Yorkshire
- Ambulance: Yorkshire
- UK Parliament: Morley and Outwood

Thorpe on the Hill (or Thorpe) is a village in the Leeds district, in the county of West Yorkshire, England. The village falls within the Ardsley and Robin Hood ward of the Leeds Metropolitan Council. It was mentioned as "Torp" in the Domesday Book together with neighbouring Carlton, Lofthouse, Middleton, and Rothwell as part of the Morley Hundred in the West Riding.

The village is situated 5 miles (8 km) south of Leeds city centre, and between Middleton and Rothwell. It is split by the M62 Motorway, and is close to the Lofthouse Interchange where the M62 meets the M1 (Junction 29 - Junction 42).

== History ==
Thorpe Hall on Middleton Lane is a Grade II* listed building. The hall bears the date 1735 on its rainwater heads, but also incorporates some earlier fabric.

In 1866 Thorpe became a separate civil parish. The parish was abolished and merged with Lofthouse on 1 April 1937.

In 1931 the parish had a population of 993.

== See also ==
- Listed buildings in Leeds (Ardsley and Robin Hood Ward)
