= Lofthouse Colliery disaster =

Mining accident in Lofthouse, West Yorkshire, England

Coordinates: 53.715°N 1.505°W

The Lofthouse Colliery disaster was a mining accident in Lofthouse, in the West Riding of Yorkshire, England, on Wednesday 21 March 1973, in which seven mine workers died when workings flooded.

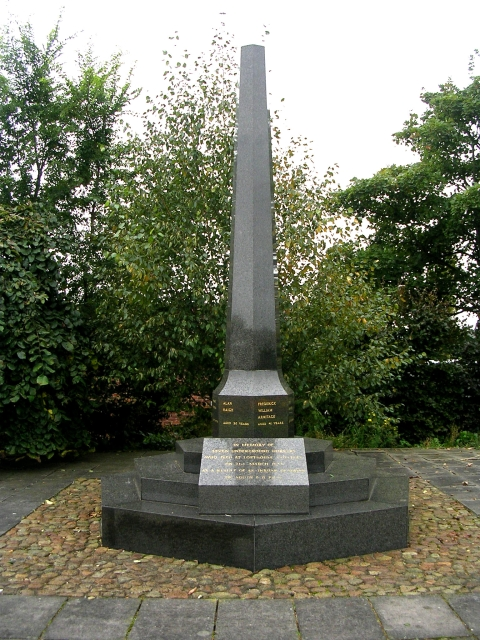
Memorial to disaster

== Disaster ==
Lofthouse Colliery was in Lofthouse Gate, close to Outwood in the Stanley Urban District, where many of the colliers lived. The village, to which the colliery was adjacent, now falls within the Ardsley and Robin Hood ward of the City of Leeds metropolitan borough but with a Wakefield postal address (WF3).

The disaster occurred when a new coalface was excavated too close to an abandoned flooded 19th-century mineshaft. The sudden inrush of three million imperial gallons (14,000 m^{3}) of water trapped seven mine workers 750 feet (230 m) below ground. A six-day rescue operation succeeded in recovering only one body, that of Charles Cotton. The location of the flooded shaft was known to National Coal Board (NCB) surveyors but they had not believed it to be as deep as the modern workings. British Geological Survey records indicated that the flooded shaft did descend to the same depth but the NCB neglected to check these records.

== Legacy ==
The incident led to the Mines (Precautions Against Inrushes) Regulations 1979 (PAIR), requiring:

...examination of records held by the Natural Environment Research Council which might be relevant to proposed workings [and] diligent enquiry into other sources of information which may be available, e.g. from geological memoirs, archives, libraries and persons with knowledge of the area and its history.

The response of Arthur Scargill, a compensation agent in the Yorkshire NUM, is credited with boosting his popularity with the Yorkshire miners and helping his election to the post of president of the Yorkshire Area NUM later in 1973. He accompanied the rescue teams underground and was on site for six days with the relatives of the seven deceased. At the enquiry into the incident, Scargill used notebooks of underground working from the 19th century (retrieved from the Institute of Geological Sciences in Leeds) to argue that the National Coal Board could have prevented the disaster had they acted on the information available.

Lofthouse Colliery closed in 1981. Many of the miners took transfers to the new Selby Coalfield.

== Folk song ==
There is a folk song entitled The Lofthouse Colliery Disaster attributed to Sam Richards and Tish Stubbs.

== Memorial ==
A seven-sided stone obelisk listing the names of the seven deceased miners was erected in Wrenthorpe above the point where the miners were trapped. The memorial is located on the south side of Batley Road, opposite the junction with Wrenthorpe Lane at grid reference SE 304 221.

The men who died were:

- Frederick Armitage, 41
- Colin Barnaby, 36
- Frank Billingham, 48
- Sydney Brown, 36
- Charles Cotton, 49 (the only miner whose body was recovered)
- Edward Finnegan, 40
- Alan Haigh, 30

Services and reunions were held in Wakefield and Wrenthorpe on the weekend of 23/24 March 2013 to commemorate the 40th anniversary of the disaster.

== See also ==
- Knockshinnoch Disaster
- Quecreek Mine Rescue
- The Price of Coal
