= Holy Trinity Church, Rothwell =

Coordinates: 53°45′00.2″N 1°28′52.9″W

Holy Trinity Church
- Holy Trinity Church
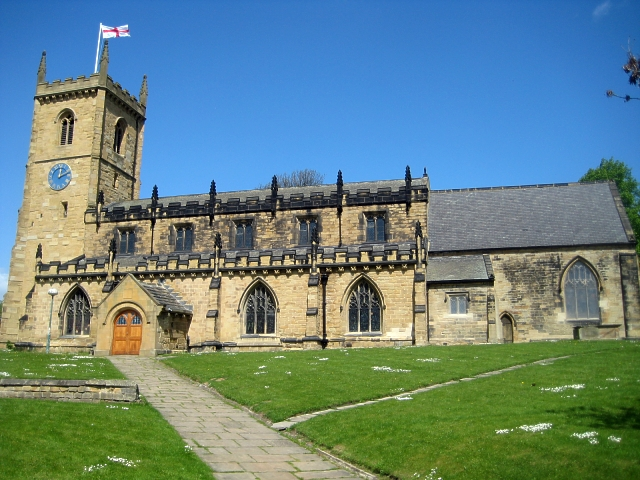
- Holy Trinity Church
- OS grid reference: SE 34316 28309
- Location: Rothwell, West Yorkshire
- Country: England
- Denomination: Church of England
- Churchmanship: Anglo-Catholic

History
- Status: Parish Church

Architecture
- Heritage designation: Grade II listed building
- Architect: C. R. Chorley
- Completed: 1873

Specifications
- Materials: Sandstone ashlar with slate roof

Administration
- Province: York
- Diocese: Leeds
- Archdeaconry: Leeds
- Parish: Rothwell

The Holy Trinity Church in Rothwell, West Yorkshire, England is an active Anglican parish church in the archdeaconry of Leeds and the Diocese of Leeds.

== History ==
There has been a church on this site since 1130. The current church was largely rebuilt to a design by C. R. Chorley and was completed in 1873.

== Architectural style ==
=== Exterior ===
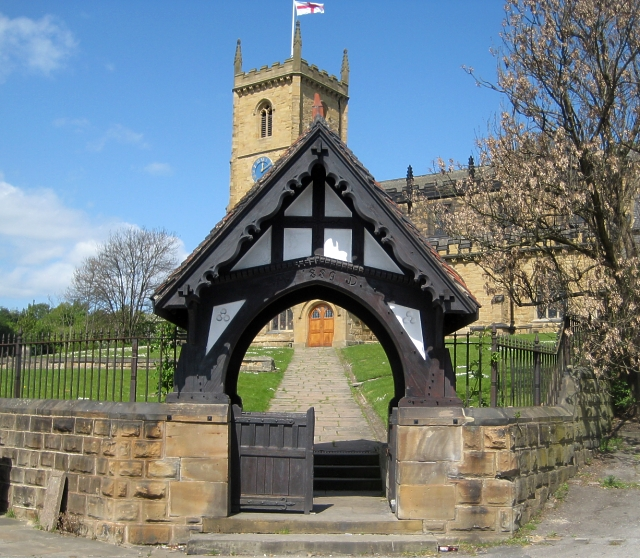
The church lychgate dating from 1889.

Although largely rebuilt in 1873 the church has some late medieval fabric. It is built of Sandstone ashlar with a slate roof. The church has a west tower built in three stages with diagonal buttresses, a clockface on its southside and belfry windows of two cusped lights. The church has a lychgate dating from 1889.

=== Interior ===
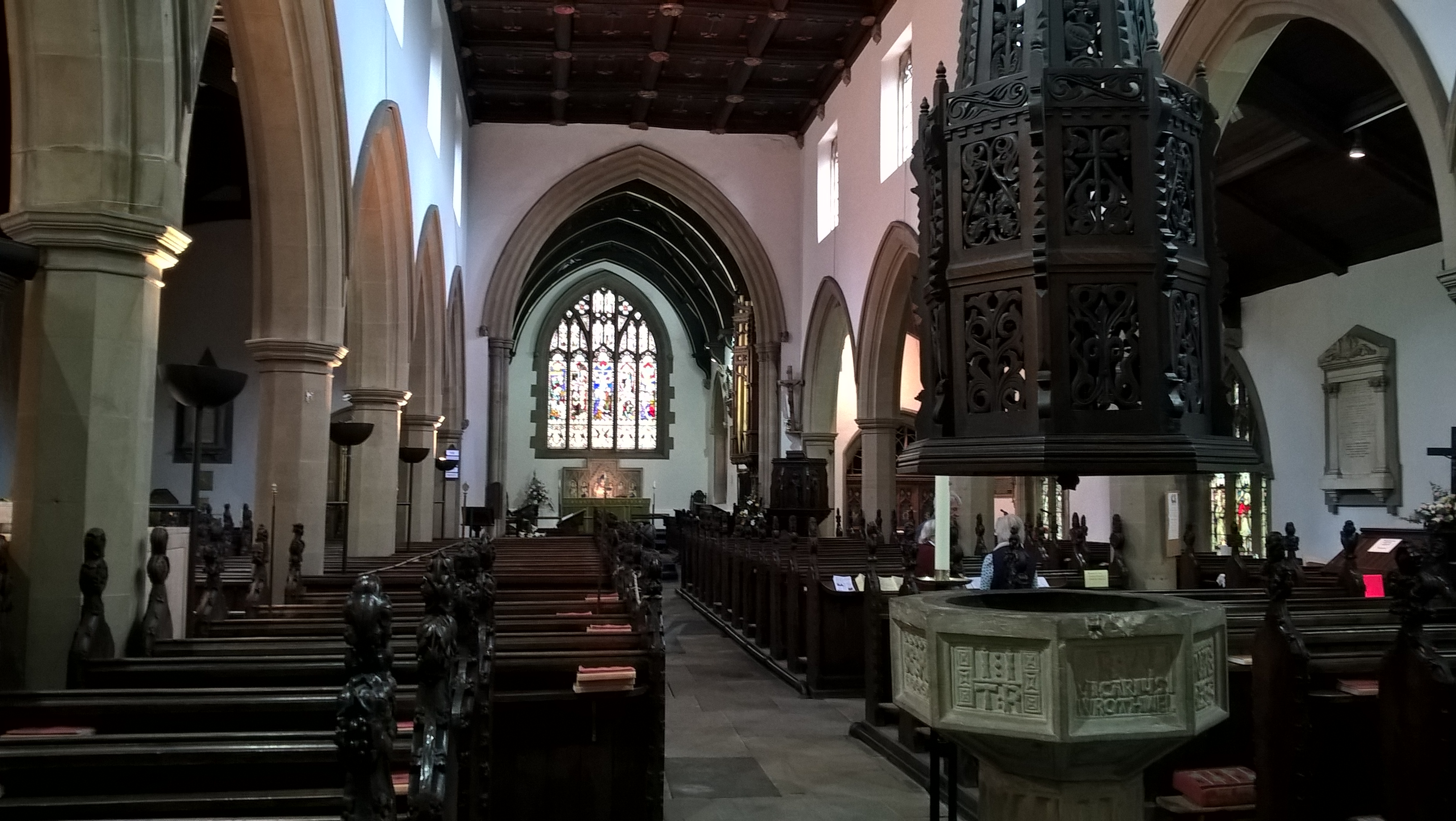
Interior

The arcades have double-chamfered arches on octagonal columns. The nave ceiling is of late-medieval origin with moulded beams and carved bosses and a font that dates from 1662.

== See also ==
- List of places of worship in the City of Leeds
