= Springhead Park, Rothwell =

Park in Rothwell, West Yorkshire, England

Springhead Park
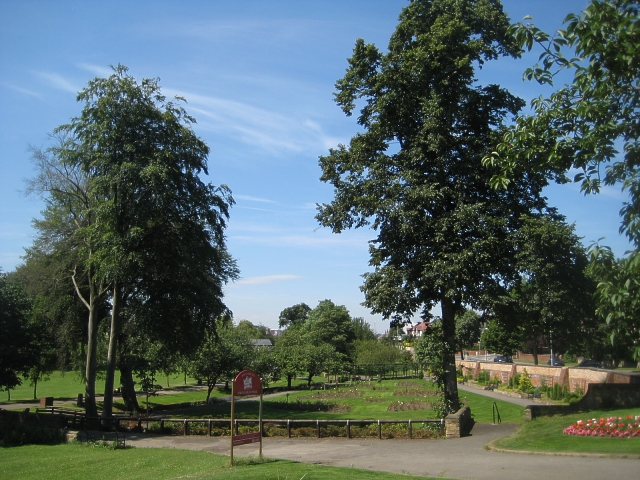
- Interactive map of Springhead Park
- Type: public
- Location: Rothwell, West Yorkshire
- Coordinates: 53.751°N 1.468°W
- Area: 22 hectares (54 acres)
- Operator: Leeds City Council
- Open: All year

Springhead Park is a park in Rothwell, West Yorkshire, England.

== History ==
Springhead Park was originally called Rothwell Park and was created between 1935 and 1937. The Western part of the park was created with funds from the West Yorkshire Joint District Miners Welfare Committee and opened in 1935. It offered tennis courts and a children's play area, a bowling green was added in 1936. The Eastern part of the park was created with money awarded by the Yorkshire Miners Union and was opened in 1937.

Springhead Park House was formerly a vicarage and is now used for business purposes. The vicarage was built between 1871 and 1872 and had later extensions. There are ornamental gardens and mature trees, commemorative gates were added at the opening of the Eastern part of the park in 1937.

== Facilities ==
There are playgrounds, a skatepark, tennis courts, crown green bowling, an aviary, a cafe, walking and picnicking. Parkrun, a free weekly timed 5k event takes place every Saturday morning at 9 AM. A new skatepark opened in 2016. In 2017 one of the UK's first dementia friendly gardens opened at the park. The garden was built around the aviary with grants from Leeds City Council and the Rothwell and District Live at Home Scheme The park has an area of 22 Hectares.
