= Rothwell Town Hall =

Municipal building in Rothwell, West Yorkshire, England

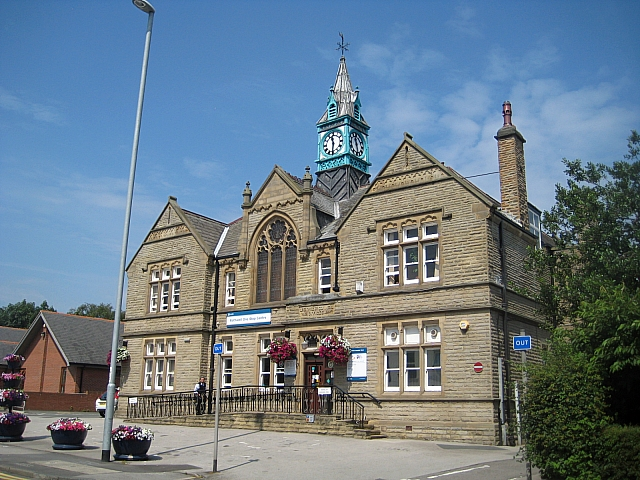
- The building in 2009

- Shown in West Yorkshire
- 53.7473°N 1.4785°W
- Location: Marsh Street, Rothwell

History
- Built: 1895

Site notes
- Architect(s): T. H. and W. E. Richardson
- Architectural style: Gothic Revival style

Rothwell Town Hall, also known as Rothwell District Council Offices, is a historic building on Marsh Street in Rothwell, a town in West Yorkshire, England. The building, which previously accommodated the offices and meeting place of Rothwell Urban District Council, has been sold to a developer to allow conversion for residential use.

== History ==
Following significant population growth, largely associated with the coal mining industry, the township of Rothwell became a local government district in 1872. After the local board was succeeded by an urban district council in 1894, the new council immediately commissioned new offices. The site they selected, on the north side of Marsh Street, was occupied by a public house known as the Fleece Beer House. The new building was designed by T. H. and W. E. Richardson in the Gothic Revival style, built in rubble masonry at a cost of £2,600 and was officially opened in June 1895.

The design involved a symmetrical main frontage of five bays facing onto Marsh Street with the end bays slightly projected forward as pavilions. The central section of three bays featured a doorway with a fanlight in the right hand bay and, on the first floor, an arched stained glass window with tracery, which was surmounted by a gable and flanked by pinnacles. The outer bays were fenestrated by mullioned and transomed windows which were decorated by hood moulds on the first floor. At roof level, there was a central clock tower with a pyramid-shaped roof, louvres and a weather vane, containing an hour-striking clock by Wm Potts & Sons. Internally, the main room was a 'lofty and commodious Council-room' on the first floor; the ground floor included offices for senior officials.

The building was extended to the rear in 1940. It continued to serve as the headquarters of the urban district council for much of the 20th century, but ceased to be the local seat of government when the enlarged Leeds City Council was formed in 1974. Later use of the building was limited: there were occasional meetings of the local area management committee of Leeds City Council, and, although a One Stop Centre was established in the building in the early years of the 21st century, the centre moved to Rothwell Library in 2016.

Leeds City Council then declared the building surplus to requirements and, despite the efforts of a local community action group, the Friends of Rothwell Civic Enterprise, the council sold it to a developer for £364,000 in December 2023. The developer submitted a planning application to convert the building into flats in April 2024.
