= Listed buildings in Rothwell, West Yorkshire =

Rothwell is a ward in the metropolitan borough of the City of Leeds, West Yorkshire, England. It contains 40 listed buildings that are recorded in the National Heritage List for England. Of these, four are listed at Grade II*, the middle of the three grades, and the others are at Grade II, the lowest grade. In addition to the town of Rothwell, the parish contains the villages of Carlton, Oulton, and Woodlesford, and the surrounding area. Most of the listed buildings are houses and cottages, farmhouses and farm buildings. The other listed buildings include churches and a gravestone, a row of almshouses, a former poorhouse, former schools, the clock tower from a former workhouse, and a war memorial.

== Key ==
Grade	Criteria
II*	Particularly important buildings of more than special interest
II	Buildings of national importance and special interest

== Buildings ==
Name and location	Photograph	Date	Notes	Grade
Holy Trinity Church, Rothwell; 53.75007°N 1.48113°W		Mid 15th century	The oldest part of the church is the tower, the chancel dates from 1825 to 1826, and the nave and aisles were rebuilt at intervals during the later 19th century. The church is built in sandstone with slate roofs, and is in Perpendicular style. It consists of a nave with a clerestory, north and south aisles, a south porch, a chancel, and a west tower. The tower has three stages, angle buttresses, a west doorway with a pointed arch, a clock face on the south, a cornice on a corbel table, and an embattled parapet with crocketed corner pinnacles. The nave and aisles have embattled parapets with pinnacles, and the east window has five lights.	II
9, 9A, 11, and 13 Farrer Lane, Oulton; 53.74779°N 1.45119°W		16th century or earlier	A farmhouse, later divided, it has a timber framed core, later encased in sandstone and brick, with a stone slate roof. There are two storeys and a U-shaped plan, consisting of a main range in sandstone with two bays, cross wings in brick, and a rear two-gabled extension at the rear with exposed timber framing. The windows vary, some are mullioned or mullioned and transomed, some have Tudor arched lintels, there is a casement window, and modern windows.	II
Carlton Hall Farmhouse; 53.73966°N 1.49369°W	—	16th century	The farmhouse was extended in the 18th century and has been much altered. The original part is timber framed and clad in stone, now rendered, and with a stone slate roof. There are two storeys, an L-shaped plan, the original range has three bays, the added wing is at right angles, and at the rear is an outshut.	II
The Nookin; 53.75010°N 1.45665°W		16th century (probable)	The ground floor of the house is in rendered stone on a plinth, the upper floor and the interior are timber framed, and the roof is of stone slate. There are two storeys and a T-shaped plan, with a main range and a gabled wing projecting on the front. In the wing is an inscribed and dated bressummer, and on the apex of the gable is a finial. The windows contain altered glazing. Inside the house is exposed timber framing.	II*
Manor Farmhouse; 53.75026°N 1.45146°W		Late 16th century	The farmhouse, which has been extended and divided, is timber framed and encased in sandstone, now rendered, and has a stone slate roof. There are two storeys and a U-shaped plan, consisting of a main range of four bays, a continuous rear outshut, and later gabled wings on the front. The windows are altered casements with hood moulds.	II
Wheel House; 53.73949°N 1.42412°W	—	Late 16th century	A house that was later altered and divided, it is timber framed, clad in brick, painted at the rear, and has a stone slate roof. There are two storeys, three bays, a continuous rear outshut, and a gabled stair turret in the centre with a bressummer and a sliding sash window. The other windows are replacements, and on the gable are three painted wheel patterns.	II
32, 34 and 36 Commercial Street, Rothwell; 53.74861°N 1.47736°W		Late 16th or early 17th century	A house, later three shops, with a timber framed core, later encased and stuccoed, on a plinth, with coved eaves and a stone slate roof. There are two low storeys, and additions at the rear. On the ground floor are three doorways and three shop windows, all with architraves, and a sash window, and in the upper floor are three square windows.	II*
Hazelwood Cottages; 53.74889°N 1.47290°W		Early 17th century (or earlier)	A farmhouse, later a private house, it is in rendered sandstone with a pantile roof. There is one storey with attics, a front of three bays, and a rear wing. On the front is a shallow gabled porch, the windows are casements, and in the attic are gabled dormers.	II
3–5 Methley Lane; 53.73987°N 1.42428°W	—	17th century	A row of three almshouses in sandstone, with quoins, and a stone slate roof with coped gables with kneelers. There is one storey, and each house has a central doorway with a Tudor arched head flanked by small two-light mullioned windows.	II
Barn south of 7 Oulton Lane, Rothwell; 53.74879°N 1.47305°W	—	17th century	The barn, later used as a store, is in sandstone patched with brick, and has a stone slate roof. There is a rectangular plan with three bays, and it contains a central square cart entry, a stable door, and blocked slit vents.	II
Bentley Square; 53.74949°N 1.45459°W		17th century (or earlier)	A farmhouse later altered and converted into two dwellings, it is in roughcast stone, and has a stone slate roof with coped gables and kneelers. There are two storeys and an L-shaped plan. It contains bay windows and casement windows.	II
Clumpcliffe Farmhouse; 53.73746°N 1.44064°W	—	17th century (or earlier)	The farmhouse is in sandstone, with quoins, a continuous hood mould, and a stone slate roof. There are two storeys and an attic, a main range of three bays with a short protruding wing between the middle and right wing, and a short lower extension on the right with a turret at the rear corner. The windows are mullioned and transomed. On the front is a doorway with an architrave, a rectangular fanlight, and a pediment, and in the right extension is a doorway with a chamfered surround and a Tudor arched head.	II
Barn northeast of Clumpcliffe Farmhouse; 53.73766°N 1.44028°W	—	17th century (or earlier)	The barn is timber framed, it is encased in brick, and has a stone slate roof. There are five bays and aisles, and it contains a square-headed cart entry and triangular vents.	II
Royds Green Farmhouse; 53.73635°N 1.46441°W	—	17th century	The farmhouse, that was later extended at the rear, is in sandstone on a plinth, the extension is in red brick, and there is a double-span stone slate roof. There are two storeys, a double-depth plan, and two bays. The windows are mullioned with four or five lights.	II
Walshan Cottage; 53.73268°N 1.46219°W	—	17th century	A farmhouse, later a private house, it was expanded in 1743. The earlier part on the right is in sandstone with quoins, the later part is in red brick, and the roof is in blue slate. In the earlier part is a doorway with a flat head, the doorway in the later part has a segmental head, and in this part is a datestone. The windows in both parts are casements.	II
10 Farrer Lane, Oulton; 53.74761°N 1.45117°W		Late 17th century	A farmhouse, later a private house, it is in sandstone, with a continuous hood mould, and a stone slate roof with coped gables, kneelers and finials. There are two storeys, the gable end faces the road, and the windows are mullioned.	II
Holly Cottage; 53.75002°N 1.45517°W		Late 17th century (probable)	A farmhouse, later expanded and divided, it is in sandstone, partly rendered, and has a stone slate roof with coped gables and kneelers. There are two storeys and a T-shaped plan, with a main two-bay range and a four-bay cross-wing. In the main range is a doorway with a chamfered surround and a Tudor arched head, and on the cross-wing is a gabled porch. Most of the windows in both parts are mullioned, with some mullions missing, and in the cross-wing are sash windows.	II
Old Briardene Cottage; 53.74708°N 1.45249°W		Late 17th century (probable)	A farmhouse, later altered and a private house, it is timber framed, encased and rendered, and has a pantile roof. There are two storeys, two bays, and a continuous rear outshut. The former front contains a doorway with an inscribed lintel, and a band stepped over the lintel. The windows in the ground floor are mullioned, with some mullions missing, and in the upper floor are horizontally-sliding sash windows. On the current front is a modern porch.	II
Oulton Farmhouse; 53.74181°N 1.45359°W	—	Late 17th century	The farmhouse, later divided, is in sandstone on a plinth, with quoins, and a stone slate roof with coped gables. There are two storeys and an attic, four bays, and a rear outshut. The original doorway has a moulded surround and a Tudor arched head, and there is an inserted doorway. The windows in the ground floor have been altered, above them is a hood mould, and in the upper floor are mullioned windows and two blocked stair windows. Inside, are back-to-back inglenook fireplaces.	II
Croft House and Ivy Cottage; 53.74968°N 1.45323°W		1688	A pair of houses, the later one dated 1699, they are in sandstone with quoins and a stone slate roof with a coped gable and kneelers on the right. There are two storeys, and each house has two bays. The left house has a Tudor arched doorway with an initialled and dated lintel, and the other house has a gabled porch and a Tudor-arched doorway with an initialled datestone. Most of the other openings in both houses have been altered.	II
Gazebo north of Clumpcliffe Farmhouse; 53.73797°N 1.44069°W	—	1708	The gazebo is in red brick with sandstone dressings, rusticated quoins, corner pilasters, a modillioned cornice, and a stone slate roof with an octagonal lantern that has an ogee cap and a ball finial. There are four bays, the two centre bays with two storeys and the outer bays with one, and two turrets at the rear. Steps lead up to the central doorway that has an architrave and a cornice. The windows are sashes, some blocked.	II*
Kennels (east), Clumpcliffe Farm; 53.73787°N 1.44044°W	—	1708	The kennels are in red brick with stone dressings, rusticated quoins, a modillioned cornice, swept eaves, and a hipped stone slate roof. The altered openings have architraves, and there are small dormers.	II
Kennels (west), Clumpcliffe Farm; 53.73786°N 1.44091°W	—	1708	The kennels are in red brick with stone dressings, rusticated quoins, a modillioned cornice, swept eaves, and a hipped stone slate roof. The altered openings have architraves, and there are small dormers.	II
Long Acre; 53.74885°N 1.47346°W		Early 18th century	A house incorporating parts of an earlier 17th-century building, it is in brown brick with some sandstone in the earlier part, and has rusticated quoins, coved eaves, and a stone slate roof. There are two storeys, and an L-shaped plan, with a front range of seven bays, and the older part forming a rear wing. On the front, some of the openings have been blocked, there is a doorway with a fanlight, and the windows are cross windows, those in the ground floor with segmental heads. In the right return is a three-light mullioned window with an inscribed lintel, and at the rear is a doorway with a cambered lintel.	II
Home Farmhouse; 53.73110°N 1.42914°W	—	Early to mid 18th century	The farmhouse, which was extended in the 19th century, is in red brick with a hipped stone slate roof. There are two storeys, and a T-shaped plan, consisting of a main range with a symmetrical front of three bays, a later cross-wing on the left, and a lower rear wing. The middle bay of the main range projects slightly under a pediment, and contains a segmental-headed doorway. The windows on the front are sashes, and at the rear are segmental-headed small-paned cross windows.	II
2 Marsh Street, Rothwell; 53.74699°N 1.47934°W		18th century	A sandstone house with rusticated quoins, a band, a moulded eaves cornice, and a slate roof. There are two storeys and four bays. The doorway and windows have raised surrounds and keystones.	II
Prospect Place; 53.74619°N 1.47699°W	—	1772	Originally a poorhouse, later used for a variety of purposes, it is in brown brick, partly rendered, with a stone slate roof. There are two storeys and seven bays, the middle three bays projecting under a dentilled pediment containing an inscribed plaque. There are two doorways with fanlights, and most of the windows are sashes.	II
Dolphin Court and Oulton House; 53.74950°N 1.45109°W		Late 18th century	A house that was extended in 1881 and later divided. The front is in red and polychrome brick, the rear is in sandstone, and the house has a dentilled cornice, a parapet, and hipped slate roofs. There are two storeys and deep cellars, a double depth plan, a symmetrical front of three bays, and a recessed wing on the right. The central doorway has pilasters, an architrave, a fanlight, and an open dentilled pediment. This is flanked by two-storey canted bay windows, and the other windows are sashes. In the left return is a large Venetian stair window, and on the rear corner are rusticated quoins.	II
Eshaldwell Brewery; 53.75736°N 1.44056°W	—	Early 19th century	The entrance block to a former brewery, it is in sandstone, with stone slate roofs. There are two storeys and the buildings form a U-shaped plan. The centre of the main block projects under a pediment, and contains a segmental-arched carriageway, above which is a lunette. On the roof is a small bellcote with a weather vane. Elsewhere, other parts are pedimented with blind oeil-de-boeuf windows, and there are various windows and doorways.	II
St John's Church, Oulton; 53.74806°N 1.45601°W		1827–29	The church, which was designed by Thomas Rickman in Early English style, is built in sandstone with a slate roof. It consists of a nave with a clerestory, north and south aisles, a north porch, an apsidal chancel, a hexagonal south vestry, and a west steeple. The steeple has a three-stage tower with angle buttresses, an arched west doorway with a moulded surround, a corbel table to the cornice, and corner pinnacles with flying buttresses to the octagonal spire that has two tiers of gableted lucarnes. There are pinnacles on the east end of the nave, the porch, the chancel, and the vestry, and the windows are lancets.	II*
Gravestone of John Blenkinsop; 53.75018°N 1.48133°W		1831	The gravestone is in the churchyard of Holy Trinity Church, Rothwell, to the north of the tower, and is to the memory of John Blenkinsop, an inventor of early railway engines. It is in sandstone, and consists of a raised rectangular slab with inscriptions.	II
Springwell Cottage and greenhouse 53.74740°N 1.45331°W		1830s	The house is in sandstone, with rusticated long-and-short quoins, a sill band, projecting eaves, and a hipped slate roof. There are two storeys, a symmetrical front of three bays, a short service wing recessed on the left, and a greenhouse in the angle. In the centre of the front is a Tuscan porch, and the windows are sashes in moulded architraves. The greenhouse has ornamental iron cresting.	II
Highfield House; 53.75651°N 1.44845°W	—	Early to mid 19th century	A stone house on a plinth, with a sill band, a cornice, a parapet, and a hipped grey slate roof. There are two storeys and fronts of three and two bays. In the centre is a portico with Roman Ionic columns, a frieze, a cornice, and a blocking course. The windows are sashes, the window over the portico with an architrave.	II
Eashald Mansions; 53.75514°N 1.44274°W		c. 1843	A large house, later divided, it is in stone with a Welsh slate roof. The main block has two storeys, a front of three bays, and four bays along the sides. At the rear is a service wing with three storeys, three bays on the sides, and two at the rear. The main block has a plinth, giant pilasters, an eaves band, a cornice, and a parapet with sections of balustrade. In the centre is an Ionic portico with a frieze, a cornice and blocking course, and a doorway with pilasters. The windows are sashes, those in the ground floor with architraves and pediments on consoles, and in the upper floor with bracketed architraves, the middle window with a cornice.	II
Oulton Hall; 53.74492°N 1.45786°W		1851–54	A large house converted into a hotel in the 20th century, it is in sandstone with a slate roof and two storeys. The original range, facing east, has five bays, and the entrance front, facing north, has three bays. The middle bay of the entrance front is recessed and contains a porch with four Ionic columns, the capitals with swags, and a doorway with a moulded architrave flanked by side windows with banded rusticated surrounds. In the outer bays are two-storey bay windows. The windows are tripartite, those in the ground floor with pilasters and an architrave, in a segmental-headed recess, and in the upper floor with a cornice, and a pediment over the central light.	II
All Saints Church, Woodlesford; 53.75809°N 1.44659°W		1870	The church is in sandstone with a slate roof, and consists of a nave, a south porch, a south transept, a chancel, and a south tower, the former spire having been demolished. The tower has three stages, angle buttresses, a parapet pierced with trefoils, and a semicircular stair turret in the angle with the chancel.	II
Rothwell Infants School; 53.74625°N 1.48053°W		1872	The former school and master's house are in red brick with dressings in stone and terracotta, on a chamfered plinth, with Welsh slate roofs, coped gables, moulded kneelers and finials. The house on the left has two storeys with a gabled front, a doorway with a polychromatic arch and hood, and casement windows. The school has a single storey and an L-shaped plan, with fronts on Carlton Lane and Windmill Lane.	II
Clock Tower, St. George's Hospital; 53.75634°N 1.50074°W		Late 19th century	The clock and water tower with attached chimney from the former workhouse is in two stages. The lower stage is in red brick, and has giant round-arched blind arcading with imposts and a cornice, and at the top is a cantilevered balcony on brackets. The upper stage is timber framed with clock faces on three sides, over which is a cornice, and a pyramidal roof with a finial. On the fourth side is a tapering chimney stack.	II
Former primary school, Oulton; 53.75008°N 1.45096°W		1877	The school, later used for other purposes, is in sandstone with a stone slate roof. There is one storey and an L-shaped plan, consisting of a main range of five bays, the outer bays projecting and gabled with large kneelers, and a short rear wing on the right. In the centre is a porch with diagonal buttresses, an outer doorway with a Tudor arch, and a gabled bellcote. The other bays contain mullioned windows with hood moulds, and in the right gable is a dated shield.	II
War memorial, Rothwell; 53.74907°N 1.47483°W		1920s	The war memorial is in a garden by a road junction. It consists of a pedestal in polished granite, on a sandstone base, on a two-stage base with three steps. The pedestal has a moulded sandstone cap, and on it stands a life-size granite statue of a soldier with a rifle. On the pedestal is an inscription and the names of those lost in the First World War, and on the base are the dates of the Second World War and the names of those lost in that conflict.	II
