= Woodlesford =

Village in West Yorkshire, England

Coordinates: 53.756710°N 1.453030°W

- Woodlesford School

- Location within West Yorkshire
- Population: 21,010
- OS grid reference: SE361290
  - London: 160 mi (260 km) SSE
- Metropolitan borough: City of Leeds
- Metropolitan county: West Yorkshire
- Region: Yorkshire and the Humber
- Country: England
- Sovereign state: United Kingdom
- Post town: LEEDS
- Postcode district: LS26
- Dialling code: 0113
- Police: West Yorkshire
- Fire: West Yorkshire
- Ambulance: Yorkshire
- UK Parliament: Wakefield and Rothwell

Woodlesford Park

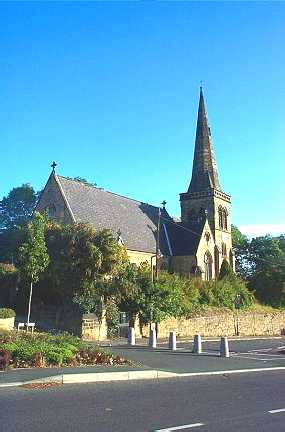
All Saints Church

Woodlesford (/ˈwʊdəlzfərd/ WUUD-əlz-fərd) is a suburban village in the City of Leeds, West Yorkshire, England, 6 miles (10 km) south-east of Leeds city centre. Formerly part of the Rothwell Urban District, it is now within the Rothwell ward of Leeds City Council. The village sits on the banks of the Aire and Calder Navigation and river system.

== History ==
The name was first recorded between 1188 and 1202, in the form Widlesford, with other medieval forms including Wryd(e)lesford(e). These other forms are closer to the likely origin: Old English *wrīdels 'bush' + ford 'ford'. Maps suggest the ford was likely on a dried up bend on the River Aire, now a car park, near the present day Woodlesford Lock on the Aire and Calder Navigation.

Much of Woodlesford's expansion took place in the nineteenth century as a mining and stone quarrying village. The closest pit to the centre of the village was sunk to the Beeston seam in the 1870s but was only operational for a few years. Many of the miners employed there then moved to work at pits owned by T & R W Bower Ltd on the opposite side of the river on the Lowther estate at Swillington. Miners living in Woodlesford also worked at the Rothwell pits owned by J & J Charlesworth. There was a big influx in population in 1911 when Henry Briggs, Son & Company Ltd sunk two shafts to the Beeston and Silkstone seam at Water Haigh. That pit stayed in production until 1970 when many from its workforce were made redundant or were dispersed to other collieries in the area and further afield on the Selby coalfield. When coal production ceased at Rothwell in 1983 the area declined but has recovered in large part due to its proximity to the centre of Leeds with housing for commuters.

The village was the home of Bentley's Yorkshire Bitter but after the brewery was acquired by Whitbread plc in 1968 beer production ceased in 1972. The brewery premises served as a distribution centre until 1983. The Bentley family started the brewery in 1828. They also built Eshald Mansion and were major benefactors of All Saints Church. The church opened in 1870 and closed in the 1990s. It has since been redeveloped as a house and Eshald Mansion divided into flats.

Originally Woodlesford was separated from the neighbouring village of Oulton but this is no longer the case due to the residential expansion of both villages. The official boundary between the two villages runs through the centre of the Midland Hotel public house, along Midland Street and then across to Holmsley Field Lane. This placed the now closed Oulton Library in Woodlesford. The Woodlesford postal district also extended as far as the now disappeared mining village of Bowers Row on the Swillington side of the river.

== Community ==
Woodlesford is now a residential part of the commuter belt that services the city of Leeds. It once had a number of industries, including its own pottery, match factory, quarries, and a brewery. It was divided into two parts "Old Woodlesford" and "New Woodlesford". The old part of the village is situated to the north of a park on the hill and contains the school, the chapel and former church. New Woodlesford related to houses on Midland Street and the area on Aberford Road which is now dominated by 19th-century terraces, a Co-op store and a butcher's.

At the centre of the village is a small park which contains a football pitch, children's play area and skatepark. The closest sports facility is Rothwell Sports Centre in neighbouring Oulton. Woodlesford has two public houses and there are other pubs and restaurants in the nearby area. In 2010 the White Hart on Church Street closed to the public and was demolished. It had been Woodlesford's largest pub. The village contains a post office, a convenience store, a newsagent and other shops and food outlets. Some people in the area travel to Leeds or Wakefield for recreation.

The village has an Army Cadet Force unit, part of Yorkshire (North & West) ACF, which is based on Oulton Lane near the playing field/skate park.

== Transport ==
Woodlesford railway station to the north-east of the village provides trains to Leeds, Barnsley, Sheffield and Goole from which services link to major cities throughout the country.

The station operates seven days a week, with services on the Hallam Line (Leeds to Sheffield); and the Pontefract Line (Leeds to Knottingley, with limited services continuing to Goole). The service connects to Leeds City Centre, with a journey time of eight minutes. Other services connect the village to Castleford, Normanton, Glasshoughton, Pontefract Monkhill, Knottingley, Wakefield Kirkgate, Darton, Barnsley, Wombwell, Elsecar, Chapeltown, Meadowhall Interchange and Sheffield.

In the summer the Scarborough Spa Express train operates services to Scarborough on alternative Thursdays, calling at Woodlesford station. Passengers spend three to four hours at Scarborough before the return journey. The service is diesel powered to York and steam powered from York to Scarborough.

Major roads are situated nearby including the M1, M62, A1 and an M1/A1 link road.

== Education ==
Most primary age children in the area attend Woodlesford Primary School. The school was opened as a "board school" in 1879. In 2004 Woodlesford Primary School was 24th overall in the Leeds area primary school rankings. Other children attend the Oulton Primary School. Most children between 11 and 16 attend the nearby Oulton Academy in Rothwell; others commute further to either Brigshaw High School, The Rodillian Academy or Garforth Academy.

== See also ==
- Listed buildings in Rothwell, West Yorkshire
