= Lofthouse, West Yorkshire =

Village in West Yorkshire, England

Coordinates: 53.72665°N 1.49829°W

Lofthouse
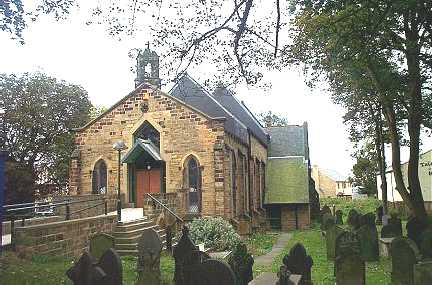
- Christ Church, Lofthouse

- Location within West Yorkshire
- OS grid reference: SE332257
- Metropolitan borough: City of Leeds
- Metropolitan county: West Yorkshire
- Region: Yorkshire and the Humber
- Country: England
- Sovereign state: United Kingdom
- Post town: WAKEFIELD
- Postcode district: WF3
- Dialling code: 01924
- Police: West Yorkshire
- Fire: West Yorkshire
- Ambulance: Yorkshire

Lofthouse is a village between the cities of Wakefield and Leeds in West Yorkshire, England. The village falls within the Ardsley and Robin Hood ward of the City of Leeds Council. It is in the City of Leeds metropolitan borough but with a Wakefield postal address (WF3). It is mentioned as Locthuse, also as Loftose in the 1086 Domesday Book.

Lofthouse has good road connections to its nearby boroughs as well as to the rest of Northern England. It can be found on the main A61 Leeds-Wakefield road and off junction 29 of the M62 and junction 42 of the M1, known locally as the Lofthouse interchange. Lofthouse Gate and Outwood are neighbouring villages on the A61 towards Wakefield and are in the Wakefield Metropolitan Area. Towards Leeds there is the village of Robin Hood.

There are two churches, Christ Church (Church of England) and Lofthouse Methodist Church, a doctor's surgery and the Rodillian Academy. Lofthouse Children's Centre is located in the Rodillian Academy grounds. The old co-operative building, just off the main A61 on Co-operative Street, is now occupied by Chill Beauty.

Lofthouse is often erroneously believed to be the scene of the Lofthouse Colliery disaster, which took place in 1973. The disaster actually took place beneath a field near the village of Kirkhamgate, where a new coalface was being worked.

== History ==
The name Lofthouse derives from the Old Norse lopt-hús meaning 'a house with a loft'.

Lofthouse was formerly a township and chapelry in the parish of Rothwell. On 1 April 1937 Lofthouse became a civil parish, being formed from Lofthouse with Carlton and Thorpe, on 1 April 1974 the parish was abolished. In 1951 the parish had a population of 7115.

== See also ==
- Listed buildings in Leeds (Ardsley and Robin Hood Ward)
