= Oulton Academy =

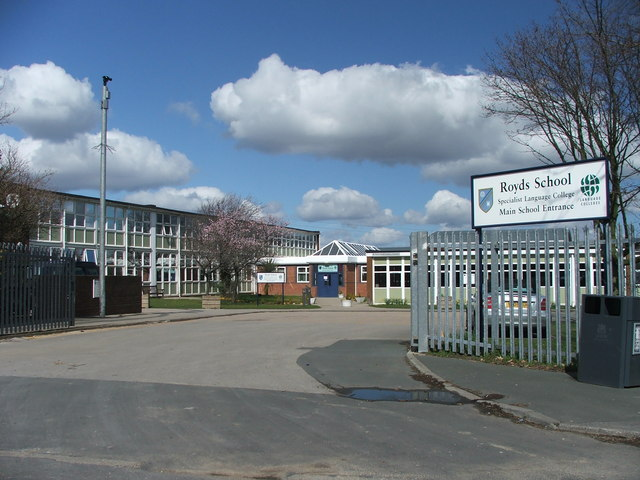

Location
- Pennington Lane; Oulton, Leeds, West Yorkshire, LS26 8EX; England; 53.737183°N 1.458600°W

Information
- Type: Academy
- Established: 1956
- Local authority: City of Leeds
- Trust: Carlton Academy Trust
- Department for Education URN: 148527 Tables
- Ofsted: Reports
- Headteacher: John Higgins
- Gender: Co-educational
- Age: 11 to 16
- Enrolment: 1053 (2024)
- Capacity: 1016
- Website: www.oultonacademy.org.uk

Oulton Academy (formerly Royds Academy, Royds School), founded in 1956, is a co-educational secondary school located in Leeds, West Yorkshire, England. The school serves approximately 1,050 pupils. Royds School was originally a secondary modern and is now a non-selective school serving Rothwell, south Leeds and the surrounding areas. This school was given an outstanding rating in 2024.

The school gained specialist Language College status in September 2003 through the specialist schools programme. This was removed in 2014.

Previously a foundation school administered by Leeds City Council, in April 2021 Royds School converted to academy status and was renamed Royds Academy. The school was sponsored by the Falcon Education Academies Trust.

In summer 2021, consultation took place with staff and parents, and it was agreed that Royds Academy would change its name to Oulton Academy in 2022.

From April 2024, the school is now sponsored by Carlton Academy Trust.

== Notable alumni ==
Former Alumni from Oulton Academy include:

- Alicia Blagg, diver
- Ryan Hall, rugby league footballer
- Alex Sutcliffe, rugby league footballer
- Tom Zanetti, rapper and boxer
