= Oulton, West Yorkshire =

Village in West Yorkshire, England

Oulton
- Village
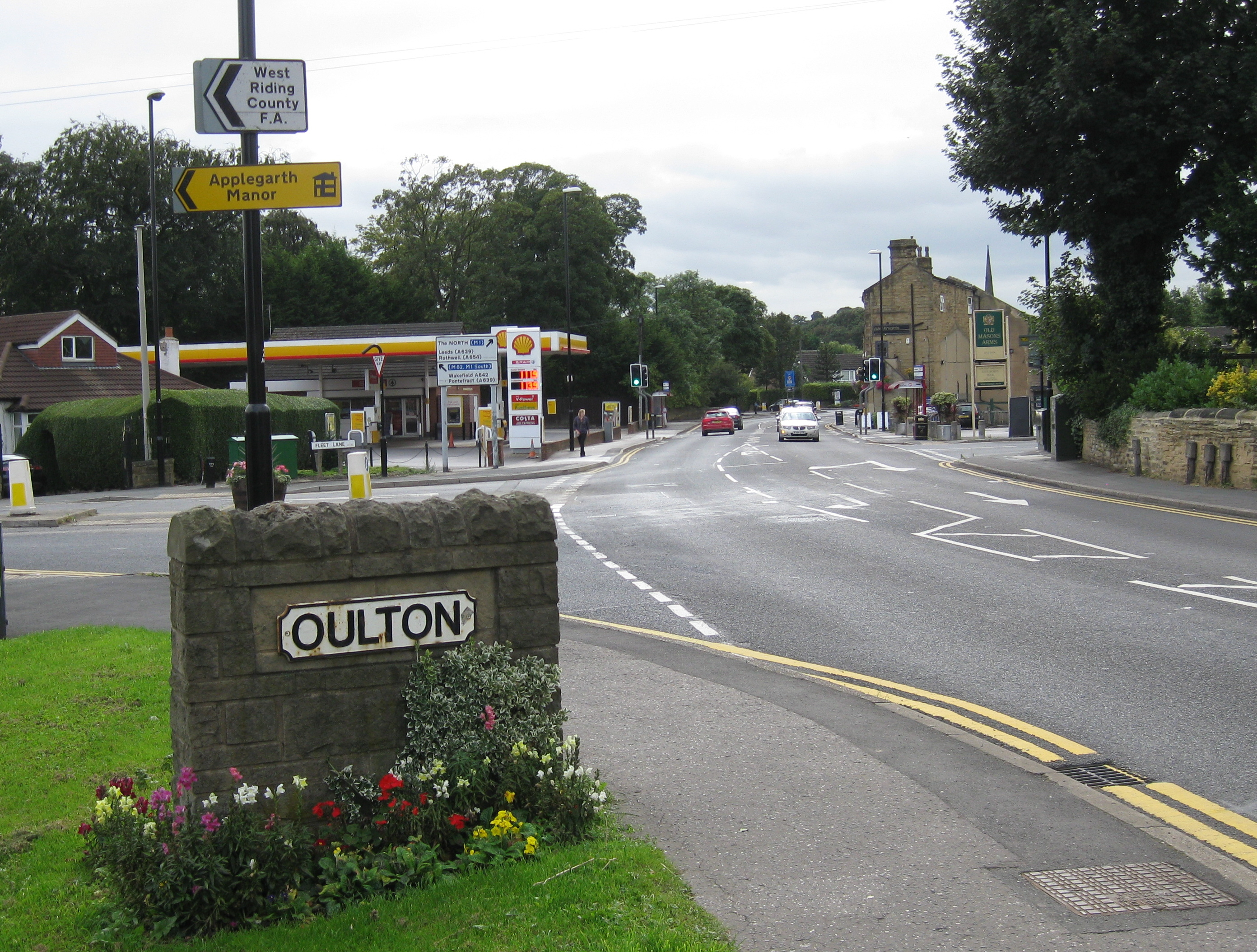
- Oulton boundary stone by the A639

- Location within West Yorkshire
  - London: 160 mi (260 km) SSE
- Metropolitan borough: City of Leeds
- Metropolitan county: West Yorkshire
- Region: Yorkshire and the Humber
- Country: England
- Sovereign state: United Kingdom
- Post town: LEEDS
- Postcode district: LS26
- Dialling code: 0113
- Police: West Yorkshire
- Fire: West Yorkshire
- Ambulance: Yorkshire
- UK Parliament: Wakefield and Rothwell

Oulton /ˈuːltən/ is a village in the City of Leeds metropolitan borough, West Yorkshire, England, between Leeds and Wakefield. It is at the junction of the A639 and A642 roads. Though now adjoining the village of Woodlesford, it was once quite separate.

The village formed part of the Rothwell Urban District until its merger into the City of Leeds Metropolitan District in 1974. Today, it sits in the Rothwell ward of Leeds City Council. It is also in the Wakefield and Rothwell parliamentary constituency.

Oulton Hall was built in 1850 and is now a hotel and conference centre.

== Sport ==
The Oulton Raiders rugby league club was founded in 1962 as Oulton Miners Welfare. In 2018 the team reached the third round of the Challenge Cup. The women's team, the Oulton Raidettes, was established in 2012. In 2022, the Raidettes won the Grand Final in the Championship and reached the quarter-finals of the Women's Challenge Cup.

== Notable and former residents ==
- Richard Bentley theologian, critic and scholar, who became Master of Trinity College, Cambridge.
- The cricketer and Anglican clergyman Henry Bell was born in Oulton.
- Francis Ingram was a slave trader and privateer.
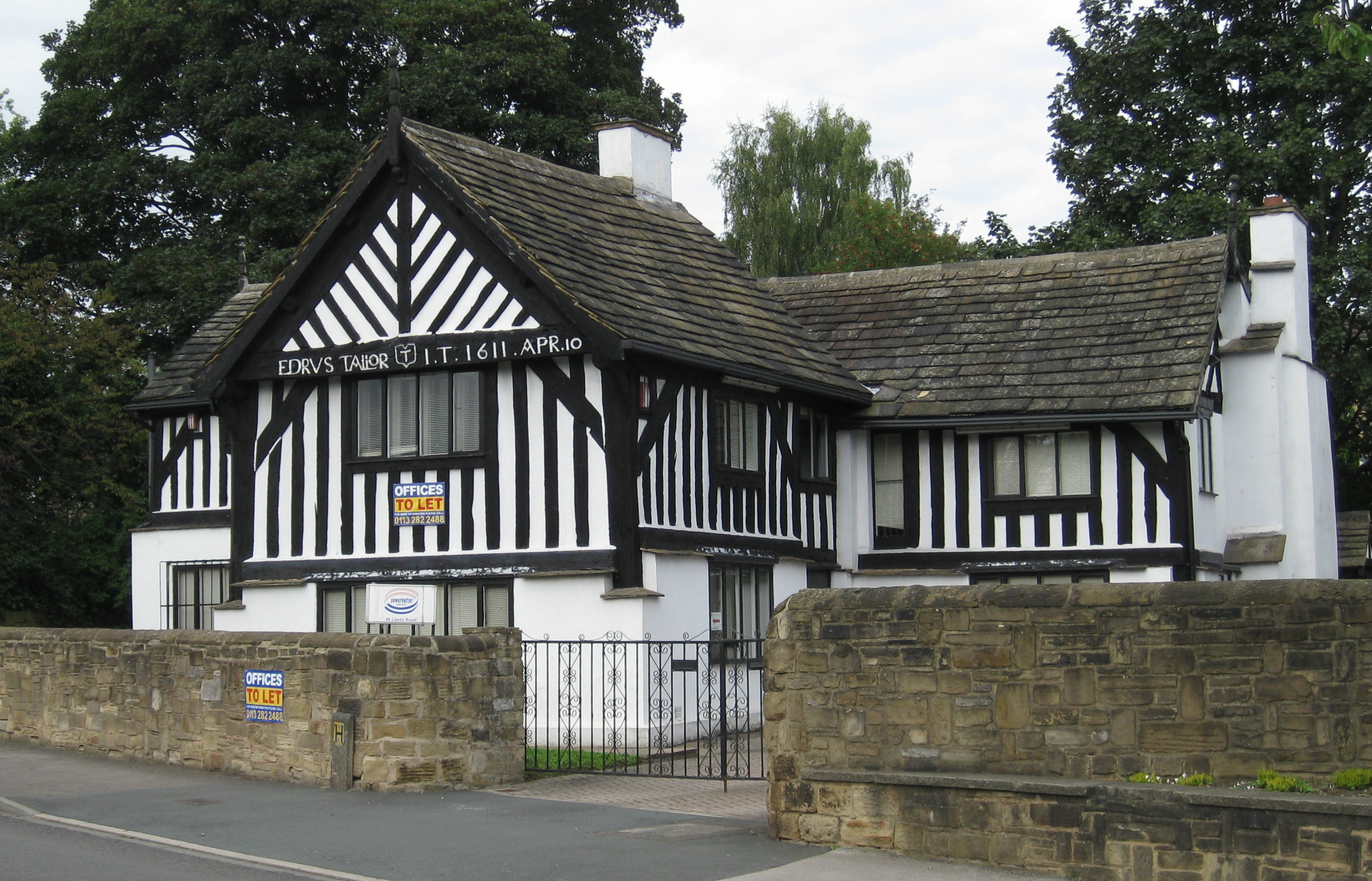
Half-Timbered house on the Leeds Road, Oulton

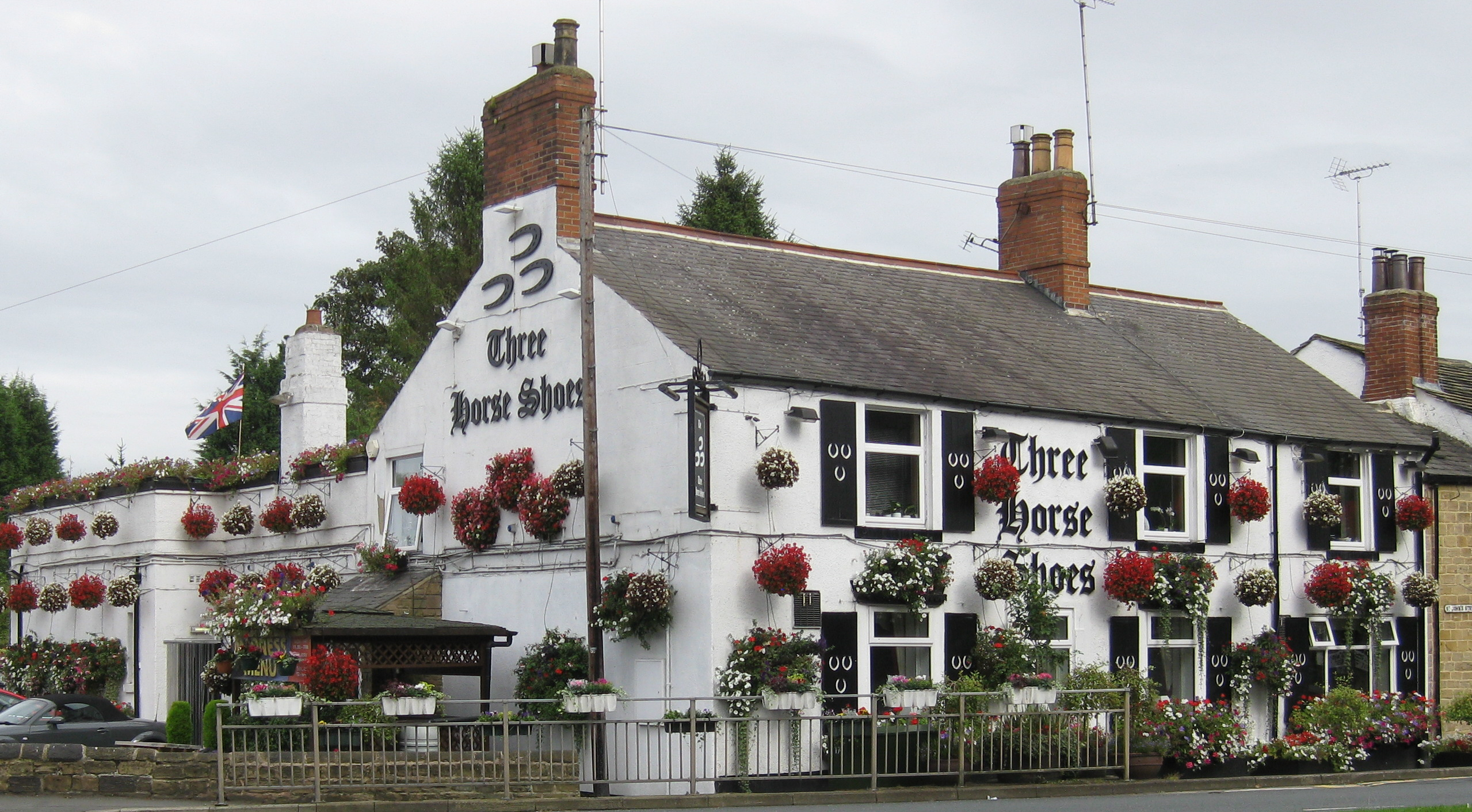
Three Horseshoes inn, Oulton

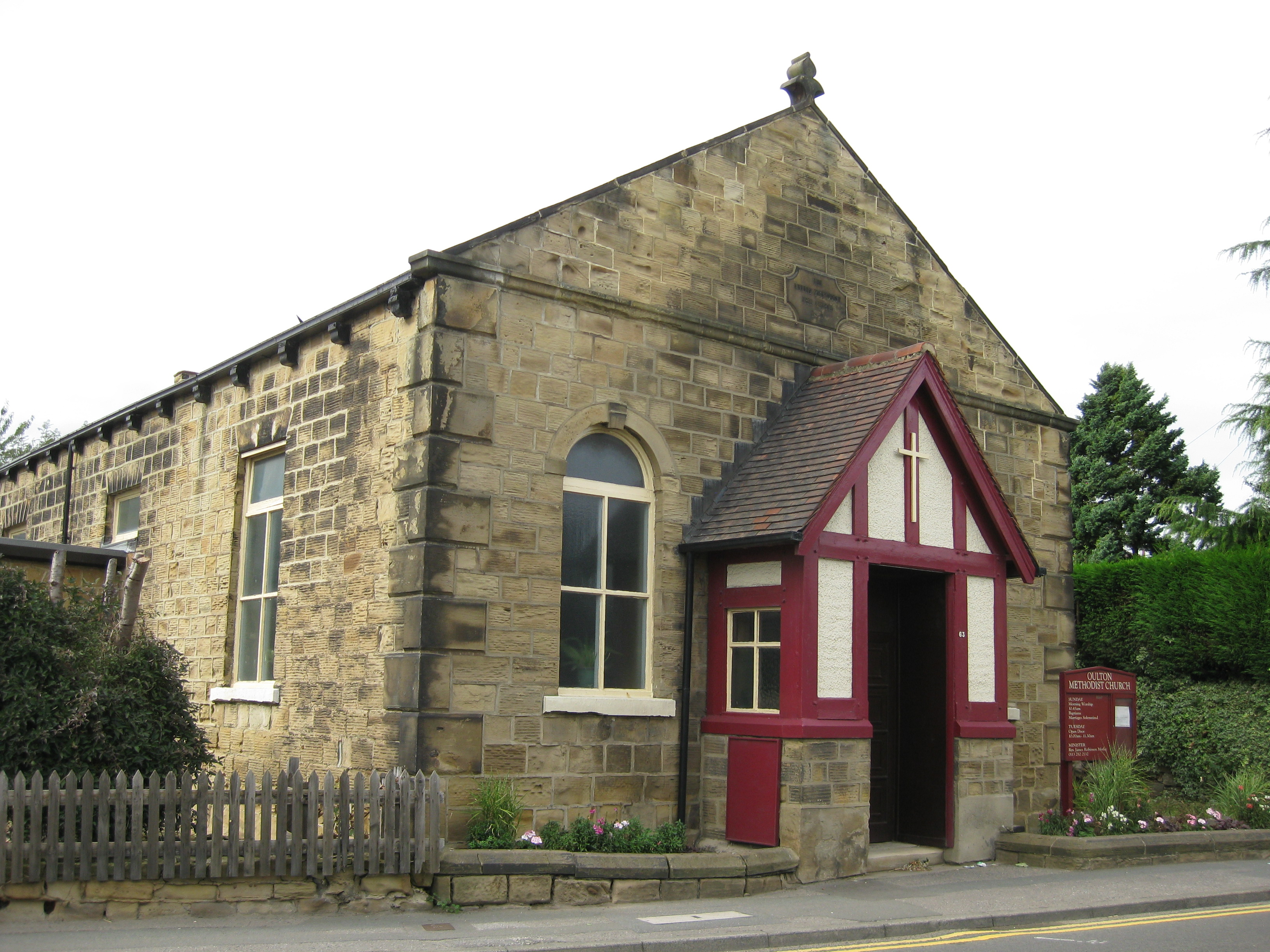
Oulton Methodist Church

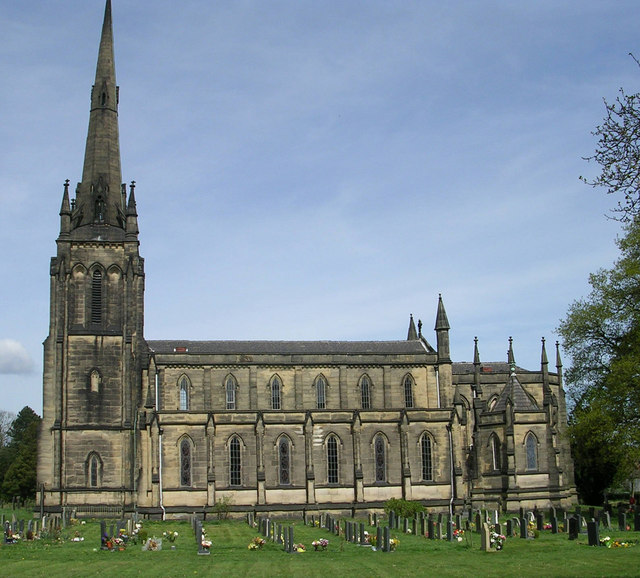
St John the Evangelist's Church

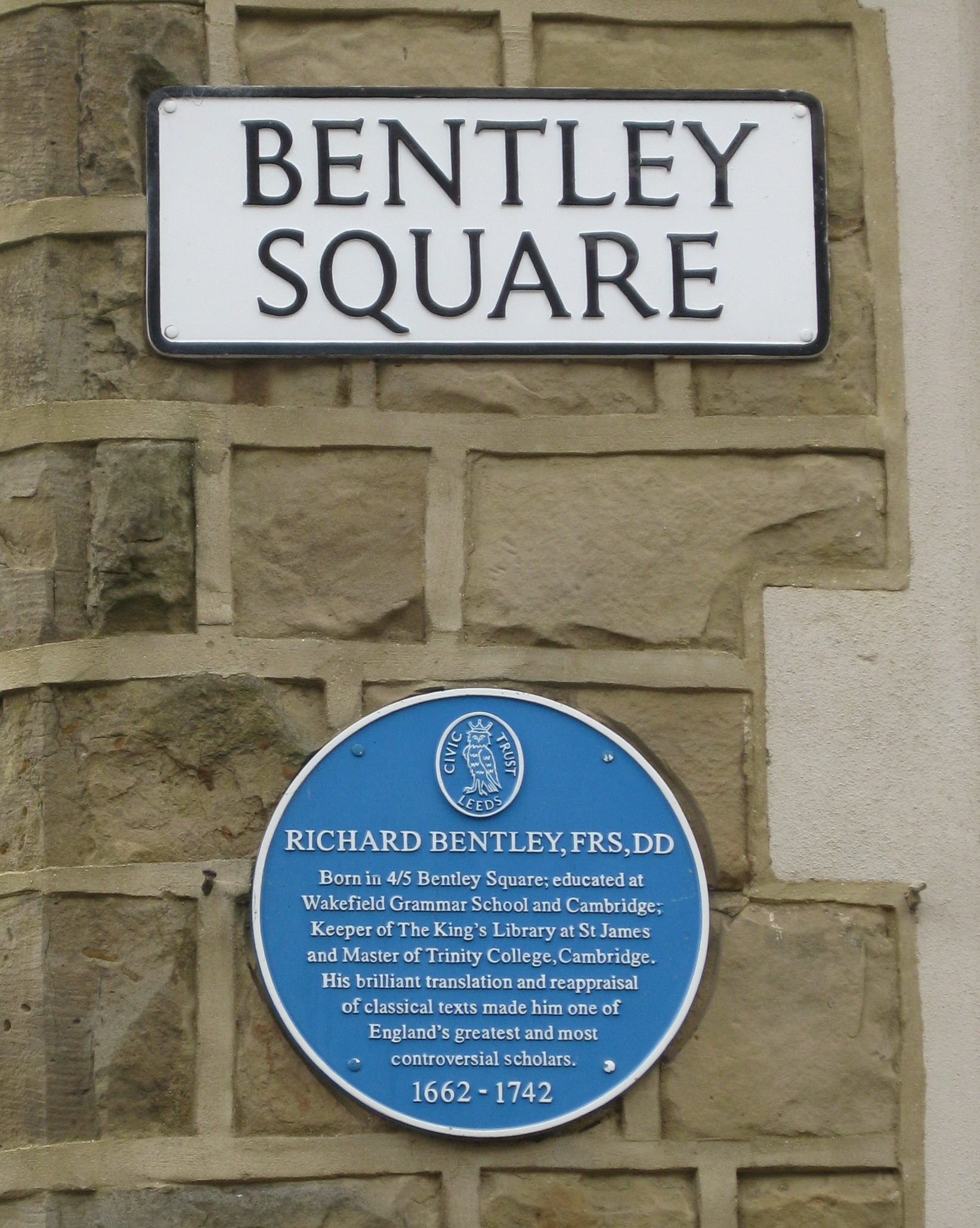
Richard Bentley plaque

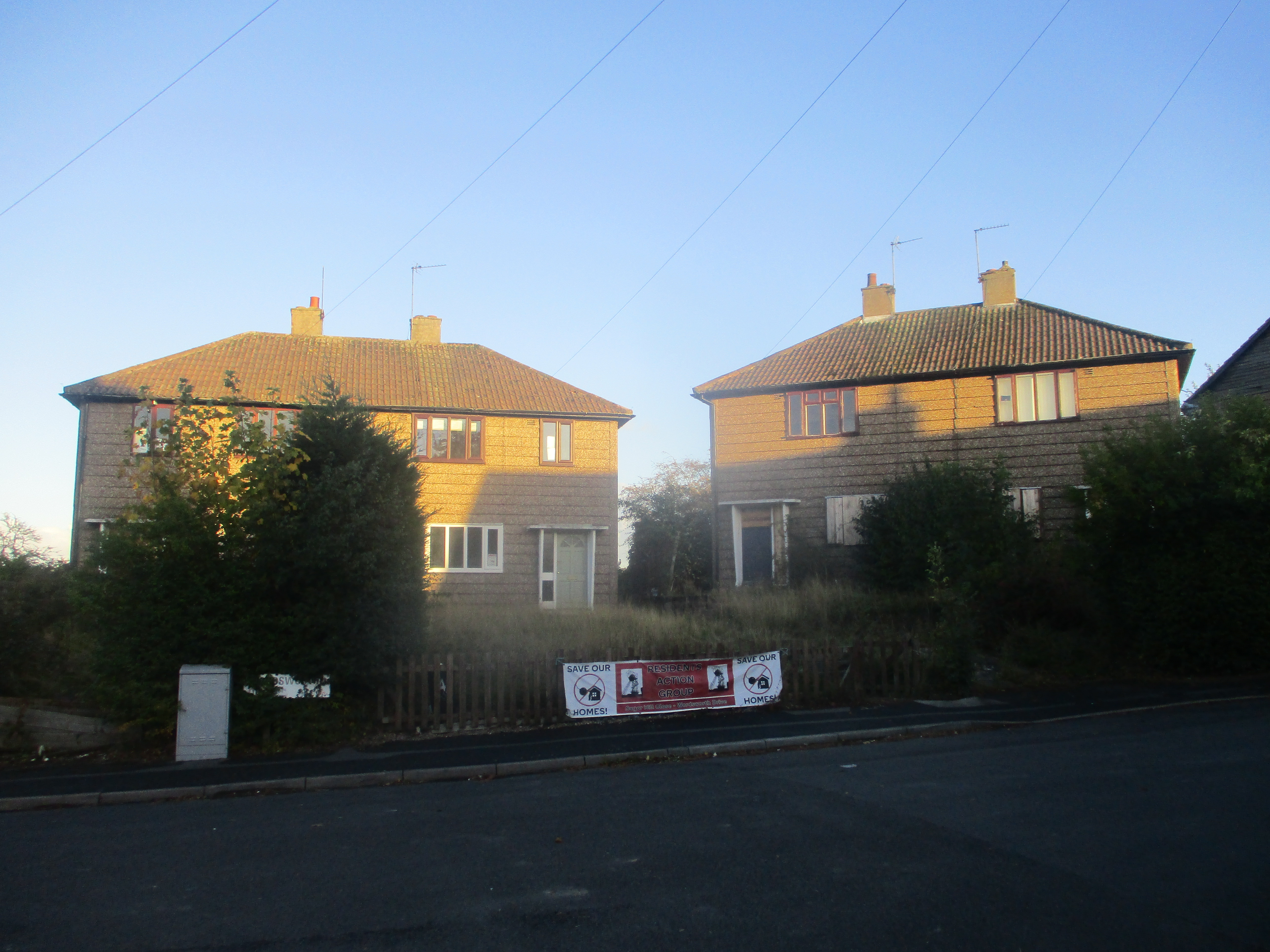
Former National Coal Board Airey houses on Wordsworth Drive under threat of demolition.

== See also ==
- Oulton Academy
- Listed buildings in Rothwell, West Yorkshire
