= Rothwell, West Yorkshire =

Market town in West Yorkshire, England

Coordinates: 53.7485°N 1.478°W

Rothwell
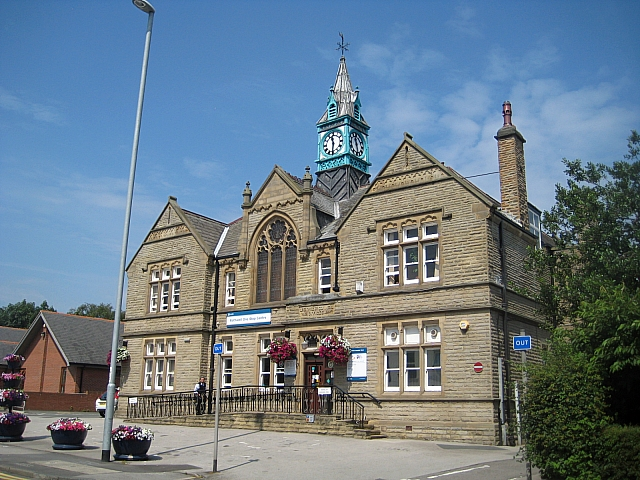
- Rothwell Town Hall

- Location within West Yorkshire
- Population: 20,354 (ward. 2011)
- OS grid reference: SE345281
- Metropolitan borough: City of Leeds
- Metropolitan county: West Yorkshire
- Region: Yorkshire and the Humber
- Country: England
- Sovereign state: United Kingdom
- Post town: LEEDS
- Postcode district: LS26
- Dialling code: 0113
- Police: West Yorkshire
- Fire: West Yorkshire
- Ambulance: Yorkshire
- UK Parliament: Wakefield and Rothwell

Rothwell is a town in the south-east of the City of Leeds metropolitan borough in West Yorkshire, England, situated between Leeds city centre and Wakefield. It is located in the eponymous Rothwell ward of Leeds City Council and Wakefield and Rothwell parliamentary constituency, and is part of the West Yorkshire Urban Area.

At the 2011 census the ward had a population of 20,354. As of the 2021 census, Rothwell has a population of 20,600. The town is close to the A1/M1 link road and the Stourton park and ride. The nearest railway station is Woodlesford.

== History ==
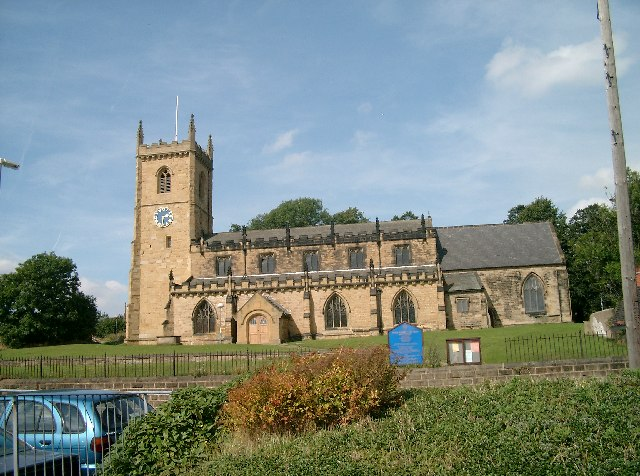
Holy Trinity Church in Rothwell.

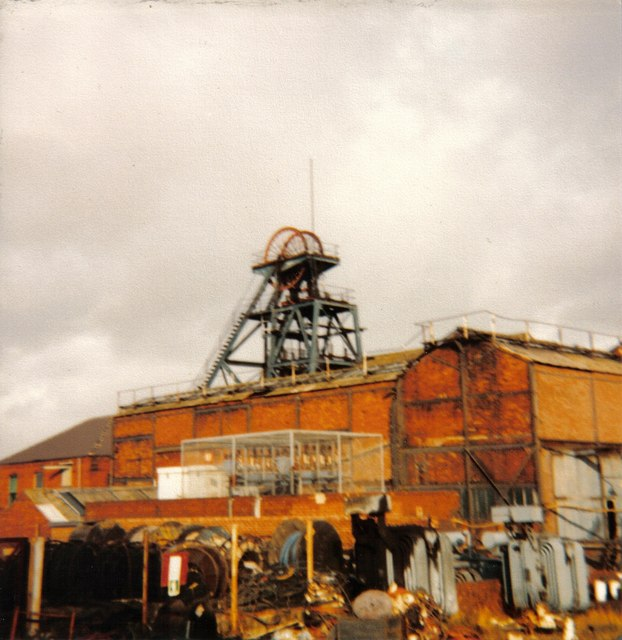
Rothwell Colliery in 1984

=== Early history ===
The name Rothwell derives from the Old English roðwella meaning 'spring in a clearing'.

Rothwell was mentioned in the Domesday Book of 1086, a landholding survey commissioned by King William the Conqueror, as "Rodewelle".

One of the royal lodge's documented owners was John of Gaunt, 1st Duke of Lancaster, who is supposed to have killed the last wild boar in England while hunting nearby; hence, a boar's head formed part of the arms of the former Rothwell Urban District Council.

The parish church (Church Street) is dedicated to the Holy Trinity and is on the site of an Anglo-Saxon predecessor. The current church, which has a ring of eight bells, is of medieval origins but was substantially rebuilt in the 19th century: the tower retains medieval fabric believed to be from the 15th century. John Blenkinsop (1783–1831), a pioneer in the use of steam locomotives on the nearby Middleton Railway, is buried at the church.

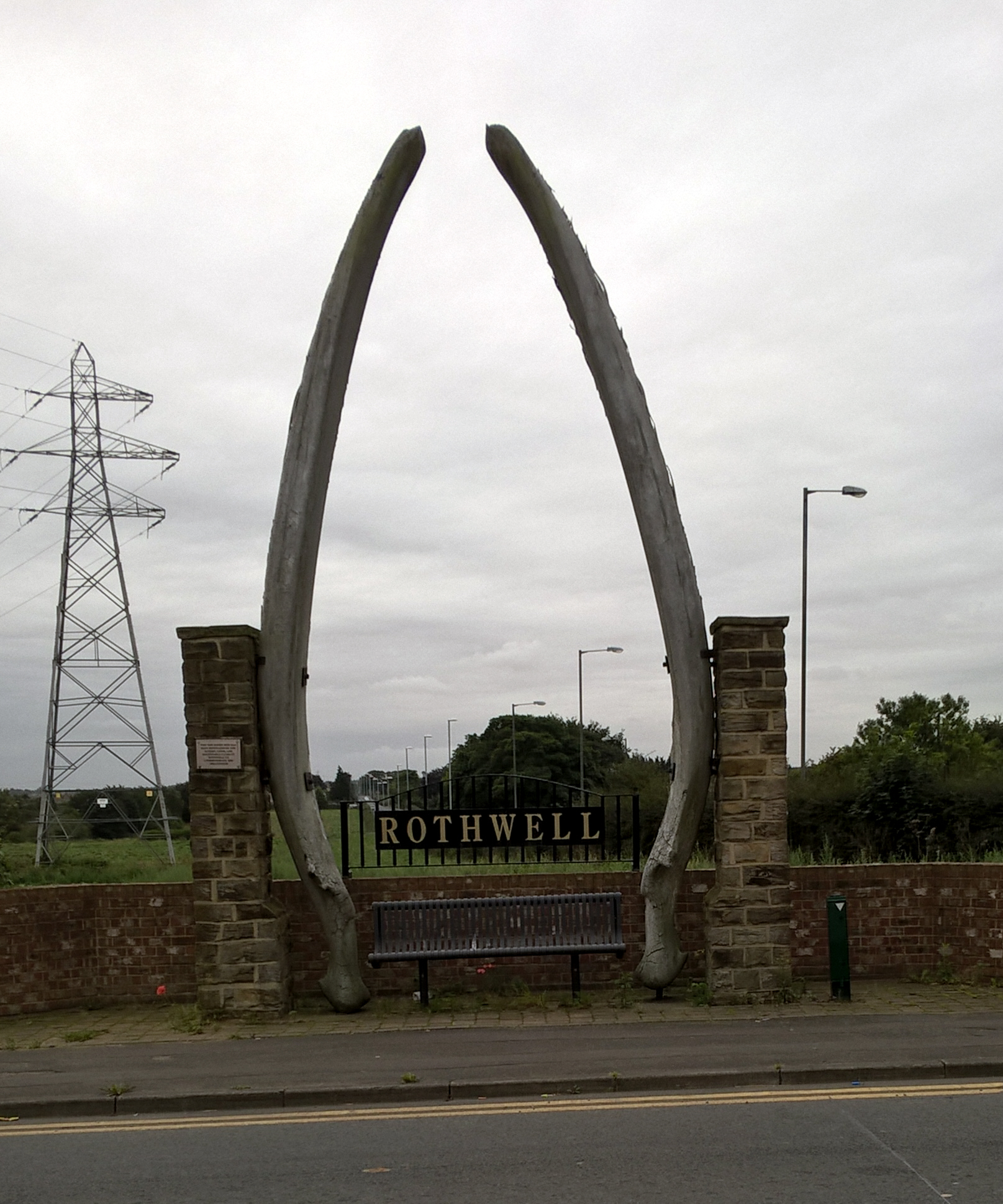
Whale jaws boundary marker

The town was granted the rights of a market town in the 15th century and a twice-yearly fair. The tradition of a fair is maintained by the annual carnival which is organised by the Rothwell Entertainments Committee. May Day is celebrated beside the stone cross and on the Pastures on the first Monday Bank Holiday in May, while Rothwell Carnival is held in Springhead Park on the second Saturday of July every year. Rothwell Town Hall was completed in 1895.

A notable landmark of the town is an arch made of whale jawbones, which has marked the northern boundary by the junction with Wood Lane and the A61 road for over 100 years.

Rothwell is part of the historic Rhubarb Triangle, with the town and surrounding areas famed for having once produced 90% of the world's winter-forced rhubarb from the forcing sheds that were common across the fields there.

=== 20th century ===
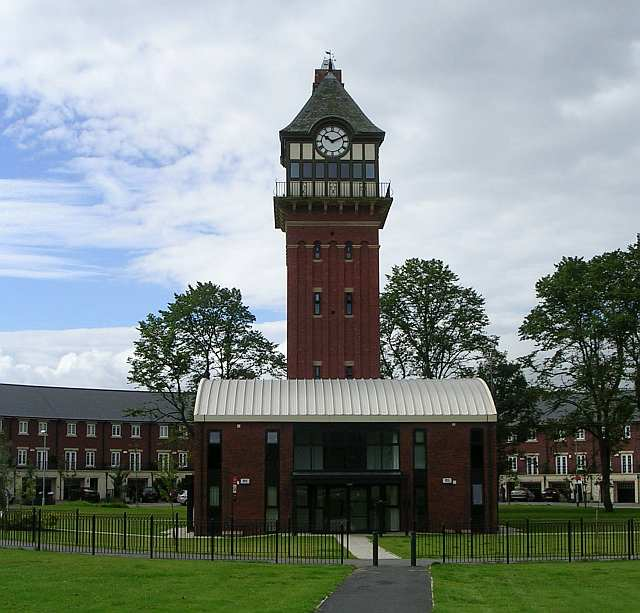
Workhouse clock tower

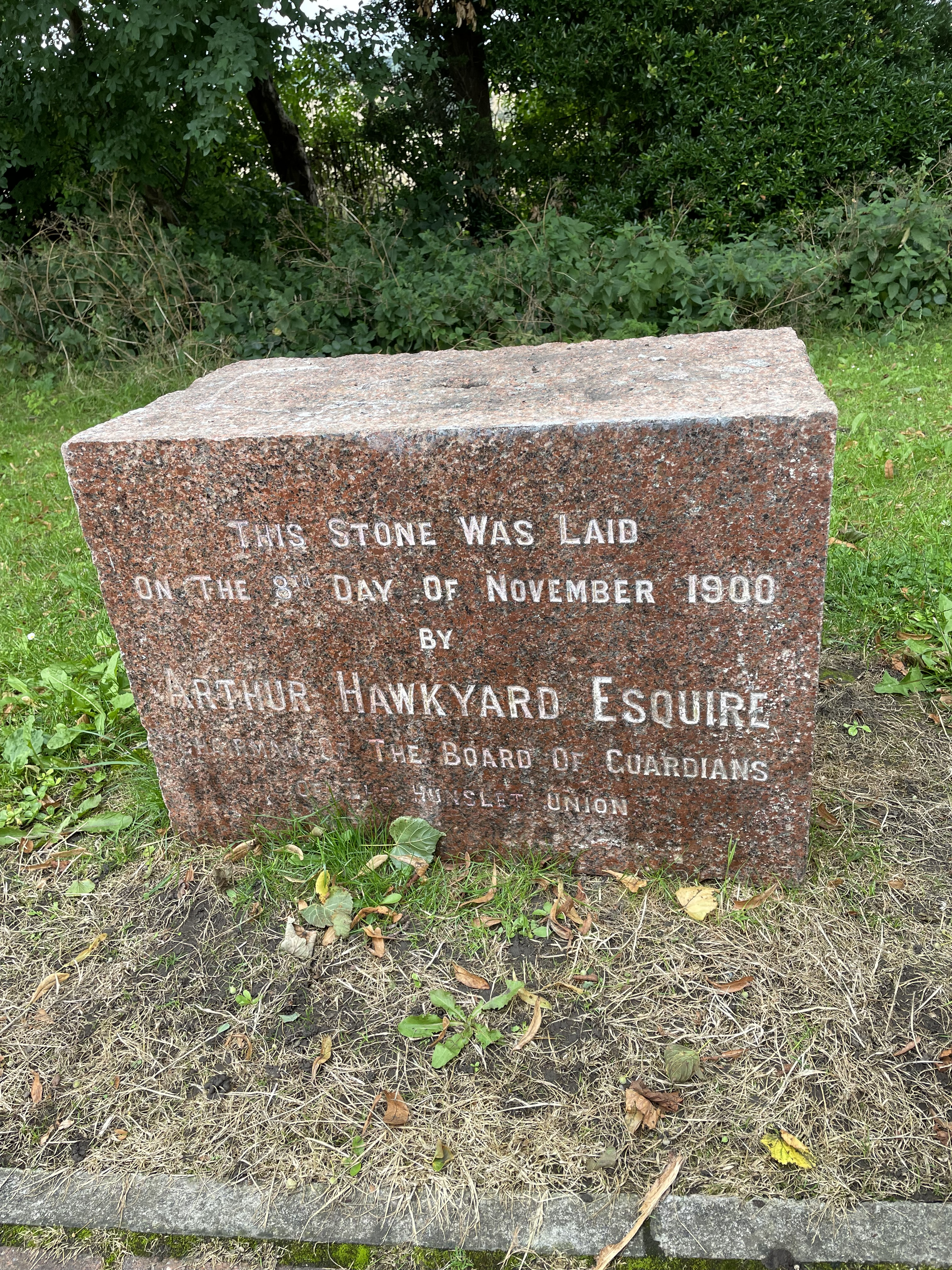
Cornerstone of St George's Hospital

St George's Hospital was situated off Wood Lane where now exists Castle Lodge Avenue and associated houses. It was built in 1903 to a design by Leeds architect Edward J. Dodgshun by the Rothwell, Methley and Hunslet Joint Isolation Hospital Committee which was formed under the Isolation Hospitals Act 1893 by an order of the West Riding County Council 10 January 1900. When first constructed it was known as the New Union Workhouse and Infirmary for the Hunslet Union. On being taken over by the Leeds Public Assistance Committee in 1934, it was renamed St George's Hospital. In 1934 it was transferred to the Leeds Health Committee. In 1948 the hospital was managed by the Leeds Group B Hospital Management Committee. After local government reorganisation in 1974, it was transferred to the Leeds Eastern District and soon after to the Leeds Western District, and was closed in December 1991. From 1934 the hospital provided accommodation for the elderly ill, patients with chronic and acute mental illness, persons with learning disabilities, a maternity ward and a separate isolation ward. The site was developed for housing at the start of the 21st century, but the original tall clock tower remains.

Rothwell Temperance Band is a Championship section brass band founded in Rothwell in 1984. Although they do not rehearse in Rothwell itself, instead rehearsing in Wakefield, they have strong connections with the town and hold many concerts for the local community. The closest Champion Section Brass Band is the Yorkshire Imperial Urquhart Travel Band, formerly of the Yorkshire Imperial Copperworks based in Stourton, from which the band is named. In 2000, the Wallace Arnold (Rothwell) Band merged with the Yorkshire Imperial Urquhart Travel Band, which became for some time the Yorkshire Imperial DUT (Rothwell) Band.

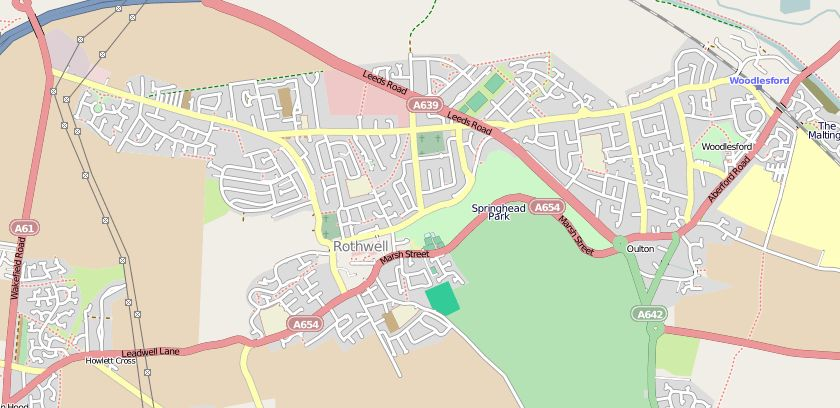
Aerial map of Rothwell

Rothwell has a long history of coal mining. It was a site of early mining, using a system known as bell pits. Coal mining has been carried out in the area for over 600 years. There were many local pits including the Fanny, the Rose and Rothwell Water Haigh. As the reserves as Rothwell Haigh Colliery were exhausted, production ended on 9 December 1983, with the majority of the 650 men employed transferring to the new Selby Coalfield. Whereas some mineworkers moved house closer to Selby, many commuted daily from Rothwell to Selby for years. After closure, the old coking plant site at Haigh Colliery remained within the Coal Products Division of the NCB until privatisation in 1994, at which point former employees banded together to buy the site and later sold the site to a housing developer. In 1995, Leeds City Council and Leeds Groundwork formed a partnership which, together with local residents and community groups, transformed the former colliery site into a 124-acre country park with a sculpture trail, a pond trail, and a habitat for various forms of flora and fauna.

=== 21st century ===
The introduction of Leeds Valley Park in the early 21st century and its subsequent expansions have caused concerns for residents due to the parking problems caused on neighbouring Wood Lane. This is despite numerous efforts by local councillors, and the community, to include further parking restrictions.

=== Administrative history ===
Rothwell was an ancient parish, comprising five townships: Lofthouse with Carlton, Middleton, Oulton with Woodlesford, Thorpe and a Rothwell township covering the old village itself and adjoining areas (the latter township also being known as "Rothwell with Rothwell Haigh and Royds Green"). All such townships also became civil parishes in 1866.

The Rothwell township was made a local government district in 1872, governed by a local board. The district was enlarged in 1892 to also include the townships of Lofthouse with Carlton and Thorpe. Such districts were converted into urban districts in 1894. Shortly afterwards, Rothwell Urban District Council built itself new council offices on Marsh Street in 1895/6.

The Rothwell Urban District was enlarged in 1937, absorbing Oulton with Woodlesford from the abolished Hunslet Rural District, and Methley, which had been a separate urban district. Rothwell Urban District was abolished in 1974 under the Local Government Act 1972, with the area becoming part of the metropolitan borough of the City of Leeds. As the 1972 Act went through parliament there was a local campaign to have Rothwell included in the Wakefield district instead of Leeds. This was accepted as an amendment to the bill in the House of Commons but was overturned in the House of Lords.

== Town centre ==
The town centre contains a variety of high street chains, independent shops, restaurants and bars, and pubs.

In 2007, the town centre experienced major redevelopments to respect the local area's conservation status, pedestrianising and restoring the original route of Commercial Street.

A new bus interchange funded by the West Yorkshire combined authority, was due to be constructed in 2022 within Marsh street car park with provision of driver restrooms and infrastructure for future electric buses. However, as of 2024, this was paused until funding becomes available.

== Education ==
There are several primary schools in Rothwell including:

- Holy Trinity Rothwell Primary School (Formerly Rothwell Church of England Primary School)
- Rothwell Primary School
- Rothwell Haigh Road Infant School
- Rothwell Victoria Junior School
- Rothwell St. Mary's Catholic primary School

There are two high schools in the Rothwell area:

- Oulton Academy (Formerly Royds School and Royds Academy).
- The Rodillian Academy – the former Rothwell Grammar School (actually in Lofthouse). Under the old 11 plus, it was the local grammar school for Rothwell and for villages south as far as Outwood.

Both Royds and Rodillian have sixth form colleges integrated in the school environment. Other further education colleges in Rothwell are:

- Leeds City College – formerly Joseph Priestley College
- WEC International was based at Springhead Park House offering Christian training in radio, and other media however has since moved.

== Notable and former residents ==
- Thomas Beckwith – F.A.S (1731–1786) English painter, genealogist and antiquary.
- Mark Bell – musician of LFO fame, worked with Björk.
- John Blenkinsop (1783–1831) – inventor of the rack railway system (buried in the grounds of Holy Trinity Church).
- Martin Kelner – journalist, author, and radio presenter.
- Michelle Hardwick – actress who portrayed Lizzie Hopkirk in The Royal and Vanessa Woodfield in Emmerdale
- Lord Newby of Rothwell – Liberal Democrat & member of the House of Lords.
- Paul Loughran – actor who portrayed Emmerdale character Butch Dingle.
- Joseph Priestley – scientist.
- The Pigeon Detectives – Indie rock band.
- Jane Tomlinson – charity fundraiser, who raised over £1.5 million whilst suffering from terminal cancer.
- Tom Zanetti – Rapper, singer and boxer.

=== In sports ===
- David Batty – footballer, played for Leeds United and Blackburn Rovers, when they were English football champions
- Jason Golden – Harlequins RL footballer.
- Ryan Hall – Leeds Rhinos Rugby League footballer.
- Carl Ablett – Leeds Rhinos Rugby league footballer.
- Jack Hunt – professional footballer, currently playing for Sheffield Wednesday
- Garry Schofield – Rugby League footballer & OBE.
- Alan Smith – Ex Leeds United and England Football player
- Jamie Thackray – Hull F.C. Rugby League footballer.

== Sports ==
=== Football ===
Rothwell is home to three football clubs:

- Rothwell Town J.F.C – who are based at John O'Gaunts Recreation Ground near Rothwell Labour Club
- Rothwell Juniors – Currently based at a purpose-built £1.5 million development at Fleet Lane, Woodlesford. Open age teams known as simply 'Rothwell FC'.
- Rothwell Albion – A newly formed club in the area.

There are numerous teams in the wider Rothwell ward, these include the Carlton Athletic and Robin Hood Athletic, among others.

=== Ball Hockey ===
Leeds Rams Ball Hockey Club (established 2019) play their home matches at Rothwell Leisure Centre. They compete in the BHUK Central Conference, and have junior teams for under 8s, under 10s, under 14s and under 16s as well as their senior team.

=== Golf ===
Oulton Hall golf course, which is currently owned by hotel group Q Hotels is located adjacent to Oulton Lane. It is the only 5-star golf resort in the North of England.

=== Bowls / Bowling ===
Bowls or bowling is also a popular sport, and there is a public bowling green in Springhead Park.

=== Tennis ===
There are four tennis courts located at Springhead Park. In 2024 these were refurbished as part of a £654,000 investment to improve tennis facilities across Leeds.

=== Squash & Racketball ===
Rothwell Squash & Racketball Club offers facilities for players of all standards from juniors and beginners up to first team Yorkshire League players.

=== Cricket ===
Rothwell Cricket Club field two teams in the Pontefract & District Cricket League, with the 1st XI competing in the top division in 2020.

=== Parkrun ===
Every Saturday morning at a Parkrun is held around Springhead Park.

== Notable places of interest ==
- Oulton Hall & Golf Course
- Holy Trinity Church, Rothwell
- Rothwell Methodist Church (founded 1764)
- The Nookin

== See also ==
- Listed buildings in Rothwell, West Yorkshire
