= Wakefield and Rothwell =

UK Parliament constituency (since 2024)

Coordinates: 53.71°N 1.49°W

- Borough constituency for the House of Commons
- Boundaries since 2024
- Boundary of Wakefield and Rothwell in Yorkshire and the Humber
- County: West Yorkshire
- Major settlements: Wakefield and Rothwell

Current constituency
- Created: 2024
- Member of Parliament: Simon Lightwood (Labour)
- Seats: One
- Created from: Wakefield; Morley and Outwood (part); Elmet and Rothwell (part)

Wakefield and Rothwell is a constituency of the House of Commons in the UK Parliament. Following the completion of the 2023 review of Westminster constituencies, it was first contested at the 2024 general election. It is currently represented by Simon Lightwood of the Labour Party, who served as MP for Wakefield from a 2022 by-election until 2024.

== Constituency profile ==
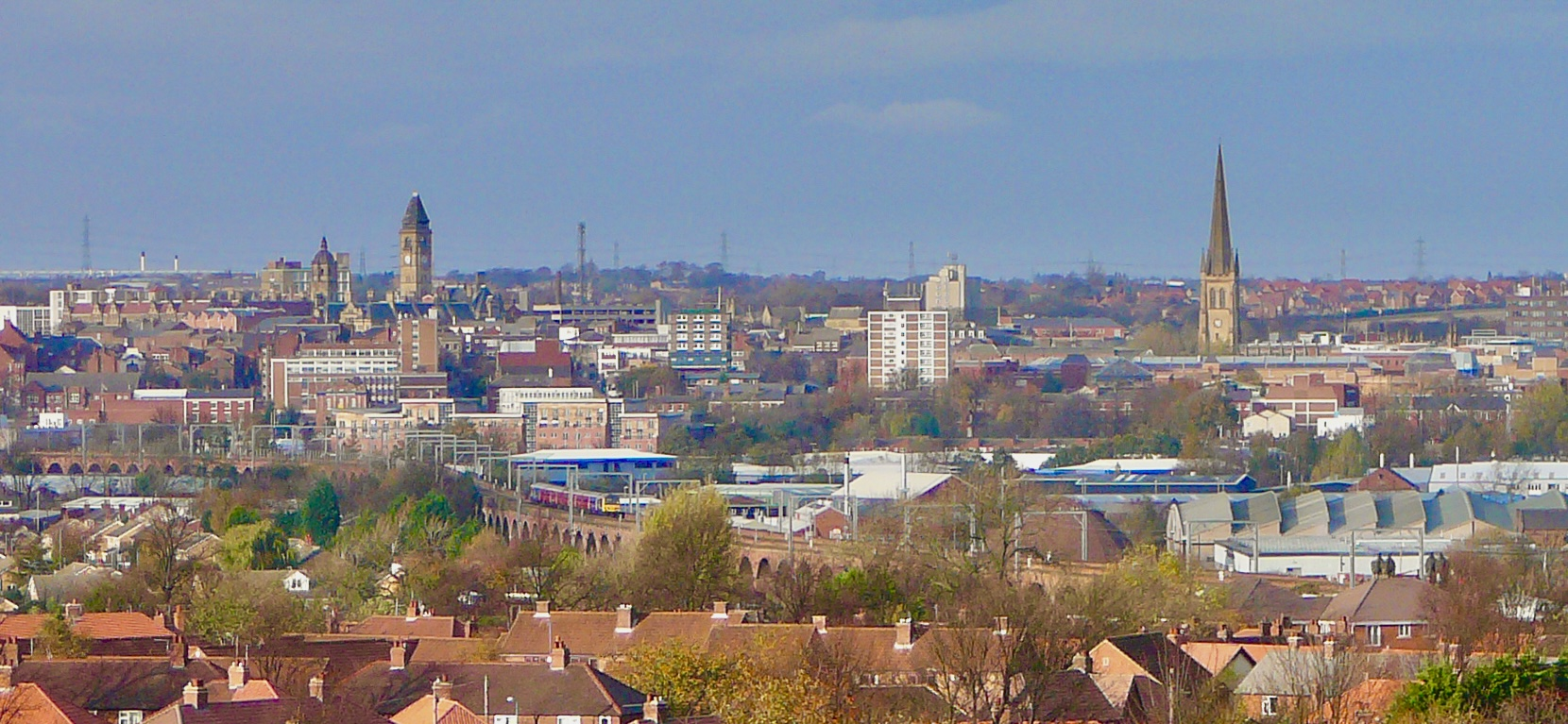
Wakefield

Wakefield and Rothwell is a constituency in West Yorkshire in England. It covers most of the city of Wakefield as well as the outlying towns and villages of Rothwell, Stanley, Woodlesford and Oulton.

Wakefield is a historic cathedral city located around 8 miles (13 km) south of Leeds. It developed as an important inland port on the River Calder and later became a centre for brewing, coal mining and textile manufacturing during the Industrial Revolution. The deindustrialisation of the late 20th century has left most of the city highly-deprived today. Rothwell is located on the outskirts of Leeds and also has a history of coal mining. The constituency overall has below-average levels of wealth, although some of Wakefield's suburbs and outlying settlements are affluent. House prices across the constituency are similar to the rest of Yorkshire and generally lower than the UK average.

Residents of Wakefield and Rothwell have a similar age profile to the country as a whole. They have below-average rates of income, average levels of homeownership and above-average rates of child poverty. Residents have low levels of education and a high proportion work in the health, transport and public sectors. The percentage claiming unemployment benefits is high. White people made up 86% of the population at the 2021 census. Asians, mostly of Pakistani origin, were the largest ethnic minority group at 8% of residents.

Most of this constituency is represented by Reform UK at the local council level, although Liberal Democrats were elected in Rothwell and its adjacent villages. Voters in Wakefield and Rothwell strongly supported leaving the European Union in the 2016 referendum; an estimated 60% voted in favour of Brexit compared to the UK-wide figure of 52%.

== Boundaries ==
The constituency is composed of the following wards (as they existed on 1 December 2020):

- The City of Leeds ward of Rothwell.
- The City of Wakefield wards of: Stanley and Outwood East; Wakefield East; Wakefield North; Wakefield West; Wrenthorpe and Outwood West.

It comprises the following areas:

- The urban areas of the City of Wakefield, representing just under half the electorate of the abolished constituency of Wakefield - the remainder was incorporated into the new constituency of Ossett and Denby Dale
- The communities of Outwood, Stanley and Wrenthorpe, previously part of Morley and Outwood (renamed Leeds South West and Morley)
- The town of Rothwell, transferred from Elmet and Rothwell, which was abolished.

== Members of Parliament ==
Wakefield prior to 2024

Election	Member	Party
2024	Simon Lightwood	Labour Co-op

== Elections ==
=== Elections in the 2020s ===
General election 2024: Wakefield and Rothwell
Party	Candidate	Votes	%	±%
Labour Co-op	Simon Lightwood	17,773	43.7	+4.2
Reform	David Dews	8,427	20.7	+17.5
Conservative	Arnold Craven	7,322	18.0	−26.9
Liberal Democrats	Stewart Golton	3,249	8.0	−2.9
Green	Ash Routh	2,389	5.9	+4.9
Workers Party	Keith Mason	705	1.7	N/A
Yorkshire	Brent Hawksley	606	1.5	+1.0
SDP	Nicholas Sanders	185	0.5	N/A
Majority		9,346	23.0	N/A
Turnout		40,656	54.2	−12.2
Registered electors		75,067		
Labour Co-op gain from Conservative		Swing	−6.7	

=== Elections in the 2010s ===
2019 notional result
Party	Vote	%
Conservative	22,022	44.9
Labour	19,396	39.5
Liberal Democrats	5,361	10.9
Brexit Party	1,586	3.2
Green	490	1.0
Others	238	0.5
Turnout	49,093	66.4
Electorate	73,968	

== See also ==
- Parliamentary constituencies in West Yorkshire
