= List of places of worship in the City of Leeds =

This article lists open, former and demolished places of worship situated within the boundaries of the City of Leeds.

== Open places of worship ==
=== Aberford ===
Name	Image	Location	Denomination	Grade	Opened	Notes
St Ricarius Church		Main Street; LS25 3BR	Church of England	II	1861	The church is of Norman origins but was rebuilt in 1861. Part of the benefice of Aberford with Micklefield.

=== Adel ===
Name	Image	Location	Denomination	Grade	Opened	Notes
Adel Methodist Church		Holt Lane; LS16 7NX	Methodist		1964	Hall built in 1938. The church is part of the Leeds South and West Methodist Circuit.
St John the Baptist Church		Church Lane	Church of England	I	1170	
Quaker Meeting House		New Adel Lane; LS16 6AZ	Quaker		1868	Local stone with attached warden's cottage

=== Allerton Bywater ===
Name	Image	Location	Denomination	Grade	Opened	Notes
St Mary the Less		Station Road WF10 2DH	Church of England		1865	Part of the parish of Kippax with Allerton Bywater and, from June 2017, part of the United Benefice of Allerton Bywater, Kippax and Swillington. Some of the stained glass came from the church of St Aidan, Great Preston (now closed).

=== Alwoodley ===
Name	Image	Location	Denomination	Grade	Opened	Notes
Alwoodley Park Methodist Church		The Lane; LS17 7BX	Methodist		1956	The church is part of the Leeds North and East Methodist Circuit
St Barnabas' Church		The View; LS17 7NA	Church of England		1963	Part of the Moor Allerton and Shadwell Team Ministry.
St Paul the Apostle		1 Buckstone Crescent at junction with King Lane, LS17 5ES	Roman Catholic		1953	Part of the Parish of Saint John Mary Vianney. The former church building is now used as a church hall.
Wigton Moor URC		High Ash Drive; LS17 8RE	United Reformed Church		1968	The church was founded in 1967 as a combined Congregational and Presbyterian congregation, before formation of the United Reformed Church. The church is a member of CTMAS (Churches Together in Moor Allerton and Shadwell). From 7 May 2022 it has been served by the Leeds URC Partnership's Ministry Team. Original plans for the High Ash estate in the 1960s included space for a church to be built with a synagogue immediately adjacent, but the proposed synagogue congregation withdrew at an early date.

=== Armley ===
Name	Image	Location	Denomination	Grade	Opened	Notes
Christ Church		Armley Ridge Road, LS12 3LN	Church of England	II*	1872	It is featured in the BBC Domesday Project.
Church at Amen Corner (Leeds Apostolic Church)		Armley Ridge Road, LS12 2RD	Pentecostal Evangelical			At the corner where Armley, Bramley and Kirkstall meet. Morning Services (10:30am) are held weekly in the Yoruba language and Afternoon Services (4pm) are in English.
Church of the Venerable Bede		Stanningley Road, Wyther, LS13 4AU	Church of England		1937	Designed by Gribbon, Foggit and Brown, the church was opened in 1937 by C. H. Tetley of the brewing family. The tower has a single 1.5 cwt bell believed to have come from St. Stephen's Church in Burmantofts.
Emmanuel Earth Ministries		Mistress Lane; LS12 2LJ	Evangelical			Building formerly The Redeemed Evangelical Mission
HM Prison Armley		2 Gloucester Terrace; LS12 2TJ	Non-denominational	II*	1847	The prison chapel is located within the "Inner Range", a Grade II* listed building designed by William Belton Perkin and Elisha Backhouse, constructed in 1847.
Sri Guru Nanak Sikh Temple		62 Tong Road; LS12 1LZ	Sikh			Originally the Mount Pisgah United Methodist Free Church, built in 1868, later Mount Pisgah Methodist Church, part of the former Leeds West Methodist Circuit.
St Bartholomew's Church		Wesley Road; LS12 1SR	Church of England	II*	1877	Noted for its Schulze organ. The outline of the previous church (demolished 1909) can be seen in the grounds.
St Bartholomew's Church Hall		Wesley Road; LS12 1SR			1968	The Church Hall was opened by Jimmy Savile. It is used for various purposes including worship by Lighthouse Chapel International (Pentecostal).
Wesley Road Chapel		Wesley Road; LS12 1UH	Methodist, Baptist and United Reformed		1987 Fourth on this site	Sunday worship is shared with Lower Wortley and Whingate Methodist Churches. Part of the Leeds South and West Circuit.
West Leeds Christadelphian Hall		118 Town Street; LS12 3JG	Christadelphian		1970	
Whingate Methodist Church and Community Centre		61 Whingate; LS12 3EJ	Methodist		1988	Part of the Leeds South and West Methodist Circuit. The original church was built in 1879. Merged in 2022 with Lower Wortley and Wesley Road Methodist Churches.

=== Arthington ===
Name	Image	Location	Denomination	Grade	Opened	Notes
St Mary and St Abanoub Church		Arthington Lane; LS21 1PL	Coptic Orthodox	II	2007 (1864)	Redundant C of E St Peter's Church, designed by George Gilbert Scott, built 1864, taken over and renamed in 2007. It serves a congregation living in West, North and East Yorkshire.

=== Bardsey ===
Name	Image	Location	Denomination	Grade	Opened	Notes
All Hallows Church		Church Lane; LS17 9DH	Church of England	I	825	Earliest parts from 825. Upper tower is Saxon (10th century), church enlarged 1100 to 1400. The Church of St Mary Magdalene in East Keswick is part of the same parish.

=== Barwick-in-Elmet ===
Name	Image	Location	Denomination	Grade	Opened	Notes
All Saints' Church		Main Street; LS15 4HR	Church of England	II*	14th century	The oldest part is 14th century; the tower is 15th century. Part of Elmete Trinity Benefice (which consists of the parishes of All Saints, Barwick in Elmet, St Philip's, Scholes and St Peter's, Thorner).
Barwick Methodist Church		The Boyle; LS15 4JN	Methodist		1900	The church is part of the Leeds North and East Methodist Circuit, formerly Leeds East Circuit.

=== Beeston ===
Name	Image	Location	Denomination	Grade	Opened	Notes
Beeston Hill United Free Church		Malvern Road; LS11 8PD	Baptist, Methodist and United Reformed		1974	The church is a Local Ecumenical Partnership with members from the Baptist, Methodist and United Reformed churches. It is part of the Leeds South and West Methodist Circuit and the URC Yorkshire Synod. From 7 May 2022 it has been served by the Leeds URC Partnership's Ministry Team.
City Evangelical Church		Malvern Street; LS11 8SX	Evangelical		1901	Originally a Baptist Chapel, now part of the Fellowship of Independent Evangelical Churches and a member of the Yorkshire Gospel Partnership.
Gurdwara Guru Nanak Nishkan Sewak Jath (GNNSJ)		78 Lady Pit Lane; LS11 6DP	Sikh		1986	Former Ringtons tea-packing factory, purchased by the Sikh community and converted into a Gurdwara in December 1986. The building is built on the birthplace of Ringtons' founder, Samuel Smith.
Jamia Masjid Abu Huraiara		1 Hardy Street; LS11 6BJ	Islam Sufi - Bareilvi		1986	Based in 1897 building of former Leeds Co-operative Society. Opened as Kashmir Muslim Welfare Association in 1986. Upper floor for worship, others for community events.
Masjid-e-Umar		29 Stratford Street; LS11 6JG	Islam Deobandi		2011	On the corner of Stratford Street and Lodge Lane.
Masjid Ibraheem		4 Woodview Rd; LS11 6LE	Islam Sunni - Deobandi		2015	
St Andrew's Methodist Church		Old Lane; LS11 8AL	Methodist		1956	The church is a twentieth-century brick building and is part of the Leeds South and West Methodist Circuit.
St Anthony of Padua Church		Old Lane; LS11 7AA	Catholic		1904	The church was designed by Kelly and Birchall, with addition of a bell tower and narthex in 1966. Now part of the parish of St. Maximillian Kolbe.
St Luke's Church		Malvern Road LS11 8PD	Church of England	II	1872	Gothic revival, gritstone, designed by Richard Adams of Leeds architects' firm Adams and Kelly
St Mary's Church		Town Street LS11 8SY	Church of England	II	1886	Part of the Parish of Beeston, along with Cottingley Church. Construction began in 1877 and was completed in 1886.
United Reformed Church in South Leeds		Dewsbury Road; LS11 5HT	United Reformed Church			Now used as a charity shop, with monthly services. Other services are at the United Reformed Church in South Leeds in Belle Isle.

=== Belle Isle ===
Name	Image	Location	Denomination	Grade	Opened	Notes
St John and St Barnabas Church		175 Belle Isle Road, LS10 3DN	Church of England		1938	C of E parish church of Belle Isle and Hunslet. Anglo Catholic churchmanship. Brick built 1938 to replace two churches in Holbeck, St John's Church and St Barnabas' Church, now demolished. Belle Isle Library was located in the crypt until a new library was built in 1965.
St Peter's Church		Petersfield Avenue, LS10 3QN	Catholic		1948	Catholic parish church of Belle Isle since 1958, part of the parish of St. Margaret Clitherow.
United Reformed Church in South Leeds		Nesfield Road, LS10 3LG	United Reformed Church		2011	Built on the site of a 1952 Congregational Church. From 7 May 2022 it has been served by the Leeds URC Partnership's Ministry Team.
West Grange Church		West Grange Garth, LS10 2AX	Evangelical			Independent church located off West Grange Drive, previously located on the East Grange Estate. The church is visible, but not accessible, from Belle Isle Road

=== Boston Spa ===
Name	Image	Location	Denomination	Grade	Opened	Notes
Boston Spa Methodist Church		Spa Lane; LS23 6AA	Methodist	II	1847	Part of the Tadcaster Methodist Circuit, close to the centre of the village. There is a Peace Garden between the church and the River Wharfe.
Martin House Hospice Chapel		Grove Road; LS23 6TX			2005	Designed by Wildblood MacDonald Architects of Wetherby and opened in 2005, it replaced the previous chapel which was lost when Whitby Lodge, a separate unit for teenagers and young people, was built.
St Mary the Virgin		High Street; LS23 6DR	Church of England	II	1814	Part of the Lower Wharfe parish and of the Benefice of Bramham, located at the western end of the village.
The King's Church		Deepdale Community Centre, Deepdale Lane LS23 6EH	Elim Pentecostal			Developed from the Bridge Community Church in Burmantofts.

=== Bramham ===
Name	Image	Location	Denomination	Grade	Opened	Notes
All Saints' Church		Back Lane	Church of England	II*	1150	The church is part of the Benefice of Bramham and has an Anglo-Saxon oval churchyard

=== Bramhope ===
Name	Image	Location	Denomination	Grade	Opened	Notes
Bramhope Methodist Church		Eastgate; LS16 9AA	Methodist	II	1895 or 1896	The church is part of the Wharfedale and Aireborough Circuit. The Historic England site referring to the National Heritage List for England states that the foundation stones bear a date of 1895.
Bramhope Puritan Chapel		Otley Road; LS16 9JE	Puritan, later Church of England	I	1649	The chapel was built by Robert Dyneley of Bramhope Hall, at his own expense. It is now maintained by Bramhope and Carlton Parish Council. Not used for regular worship but available for weddings, funerals and blessings.
Bramhope Scout Campsite		Occupation Lane; LS16 9HR	Non-denominational			There is an outdoor area within the grounds of the campsite, historically referred to as a chapel, now designated as an Area of Reflection.
St Giles' Church		Church Hill; LS16 9BA	Church of England		1881	Built on a plot of land formerly called Cripple Garth, referring to a "cripple", meaning a hole in a stone wall which would allow sheep to pass through, but not cattle. Designed by Richard Adams and John Kelly and built by local contractors. Freeman of Otley (masons) used millstone grit from nearby quarries on the Chevin. The roof has Westmorland slates. The church was dedicated on 28 November 1881.

=== Bramley ===
Name	Image	Location	Denomination	Grade	Opened	Notes
Christ the King		King's Approach LS13 2DX	Catholic		1928	
Hunters Greave Scout Activity Centre		Pollard Lane; Newlay; LS13 1EQ	Non-denominational			There is a chapel on site.
St Peter's Church		Hough Lane; LS13 3JF	Church of England			St Peter's forms the parish of Bramley, part of Churches Together around Leeds 13.
Trinity Methodist Church		Upper Town Street; LS13 2EP	Methodist		1967	Redeveloped 2009, part of the Leeds South and West Methodist Circuit. The first Methodist Chapel in Bramley was built in 1777, on the site of the existing Church.

=== Burley ===
Name	Image	Location	Denomination	Grade	Opened	Notes
Calvary International Christian Centre		Calvary Cathedral, 53 Cardigan Lane, LS4 2LE	Non-denominational	II	1898	Formerly Burley Methodist Church, which closed in June 2012. Built in Gothic Revival style.
Leeds Chinese Christian Church		155 Kirkstall Rd; LS4 2AG	Independent		1990	
Makkah Jamia Masjid		36 Thornville Road, LS6 1JY	Islam		2003	Between Brudenell Road and Royal Park Road
Our Lady of Lourdes Church		Cardigan Road; LS6 1LU	Catholic		1930	Built by the Society of Jesus as Sacred Heart Chapel, and handed over to the Diocese of Leeds in 1947, renamed 1954, and part of the parish of St Jeanne Jugan since 1997
St Matthias' Church		St Matthias' Street, LS4 2DZ; 53.806972°N 1.579264°W	Church of England	II*	1854	The church was completed in 1854; the north aisle and the west porch were added in 1886. Leeds healing rooms, affiliated to the International Association of Healing Rooms, are based in the church centre.
Winners Chapel		Burley Hall, 49-51 Cardigan Lane; LS4 2LE	Part of the Living Faith Church Worldwide	II		Former Methodist Sunday school (1904) and Church Hall. Winners Chapel in Leeds held its first service on 5 September 2010.

=== Burmantofts ===
Name	Image	Location	Denomination	Grade	Opened	Notes
Bridge Community Church		Rider Street; LS9 7BQ	Pentecostal		2016	Bridge Community Church is the operational name for Bridge Street Pentecostal Church. The church traces its origins back to a pastoral appointment at Mount Tabor Mission in 1910. The site was previously occupied by Agnes Stewart High School. The church has developed daughter churches in Boston Spa and in Chandigarh in northern India.
Hope City Church		32 York Road; LS9 8SY	Pentecostal		2008	Part of the Megacentre building, the former Leeds City Council Library HQ building. Previously met at the Leeds Hilton Hotel.
Living Hope Church		The Place, Saxton Lane; LS9 8HE	Evangelical (Non-denominational)			Image shows the frontage on Marsh Lane. HQ of Living Hope Church International.
St Agnes' Church		Stoney Rock Lane; LS9 7UQ	Church of England and Baptist	II	1889	Church of England parish church, now united with Baptist congregation.
St Patrick's Church		Torre Rd; LS9 7QL	Catholic		2001	The modern church moved from an 1891 building on Rider Street now occupied by Leeds Playhouse

=== Calverley ===
Name	Image	Location	Denomination	Grade	Opened	Notes
St Wilfrid's Parish Church		Town Gate; LS28 5NF	Church of England	II*	1154	The tower is from 1154, the rest mainly 13th and 14th century. The tower has an unusual crooked arch and houses examples of Saxon gravestones.
Calverley Methodist Church		Carr Road; LS28 5PQ	Methodist	II	1872	This church, located on the corner of Carr Road and Chapel Street, is part of the Bradford North Methodist Circuit.

=== Chapel Allerton ===
Name	Image	Location	Denomination	Grade	Opened	Notes
Chapel Allerton Hospital Chapel		Chapeltown Road; LS7 4SA	Non-denominational			The chapel is located on the third floor of the north wing.
Chapel Allerton Methodist Centre		Town Street; LS7 4NB	Methodist		1878	This former church now serves as a 'church centre' for Chapel Allerton Methodist Church. Chapel Allerton Baptist Church ("Chapel A") regularly meets there for Sunday worship.
Chapel Allerton Methodist Church		Town Street; LS7 4NB	Methodist		1983	The church is situated on Town Street and was completed in 1983, replacing the former church on Harrogate Road, now demolished. The church is part of the Leeds North and East Methodist Circuit. In January 2005 Chapel Allerton Methodist Church signed a local ecumenical covenant with St. Matthew's Parish Church. Grace Gospel Church, whose members are of Ethiopian and Eritrean origin, also meets here.
St Matthew's Church		Wood Lane; LS7 3QF	Church of England	II*	1900	The church was designed by George Frederick Bodley (1827–1907) and built on land gifted by a parishioner in 1897. In January 2005 St Matthew's signed a local ecumenical covenant with Chapel Allerton Methodist Church. Russian Orthodox church services also take place here.

=== Chapeltown ===
Name	Image	Location	Denomination	Grade	Opened	Notes
Chapeltown Community Church		Avenue Hill, LS8 4EX		II	1906	Formerly Trinity United Reformed Church, now a community church. The foundation stone was laid by Henry Robinson, Mayor of Kensington. Listed building status includes the neighbouring Sunday School building. The United Reformed Church is now part of Trinity United Methodist/URC Church in Harehills.
Church of God of Prophecy		Austin Burke Memorial Centre; 196 Chapeltown Road; LS7 4HZ	Pentecostal		1992	Purpose-built church and community centre, hence no religious symbols inside. Congregation formerly in Baptist Chapel, Meanwood Road. Part of Region 5 of the Church of God of Prophecy in the UK.
Gurdwara Guru Kalgidhar Sahib		Cowper Street, LS7 4EE	Sikhism		2008	Moved from 128 Chapeltown Road (the first Gurdwara in Leeds) to larger premises on Cowper Street
Holy Rosary Church		Chapeltown Road; LS7 4BZ	Catholic		1937	An earlier church of the Holy Rosary was built in Barrack Street in 1886. The present church, which was designed to seat 500 people in the nave and transepts and cost £12,300, was opened by Bishop Henry Poskitt of Leeds on 30 September 1937. It was reordered around 1987 to create a smaller nave and a narthex. Part of the parish of Mother of Unfailing Help.
Leeds Islamic Centre		46 Spencer Place; LS7 4BR	Muslim		2001	The site was originally the Chassidishe Synagogue.
Our Lady of Czestochowa and St. Stanislaw Kostka		Newton Hill Road; LS7 4EY	Polish Roman Catholic		1976	The church is a Polish language Roman Catholic church. Entrance as postcode but faces Chapeltown Road.
Ramgarhia Board Gurdwara		8-10 Chapeltown Road LS7 3AP	Sikh		1987	Former post office. Replaced the building at 138 Chapeltown Road. Opened by Prince Richard, Duke of Gloucester.
Roscoe Methodist Church		Francis Street; LS7 4BY	Methodism		1974 (replacing an earlier building)	The church is part of the Leeds North and East Methodist Circuit.
Sikh Temple		192 Chapeltown Road; LS7 4HZ	Sikhism		1999	Replaced the former Union Chapel on the other side of the road.
Wesleyan Holiness Church		Laycock Place; LS7 3JA	Wesleyan Holiness Church		1982	This is the only Wesleyan Holiness Church in Yorkshire

=== City Centre ===
Name	Image	Location	Denomination	Grade	Opened	Notes
Holy Trinity Church (Church of the Holy Trinity)		Boar Lane; LS1 6HW	Church of England	I	1727	Parish Church in the Parish of Leeds City, along with Leeds Minster. It was built in 1722–7, but the steeple dates from 1839. Now used by the Riverside Church.
Jamyang Buddhist and Meditation Centre		12 York Place; LS1 2DS	Tibetan Buddhist		29 September 2018	In the basement. Moved from 31 St Paul's Street.
Kadampa Meditation Centre		Waterloo House; Assembly Street; LS2 7DE	Buddhist	II*	July 2022	Represents the Buddhist New Kadampa Tradition. Building dates from 1777 as the Assembly Rooms, annex to the White Cloth Hall.
Leeds Cathedral (Cathedral Church of St Anne)		Great George Street LS2 8BE	Catholic	II*	1904	Officially the Cathedral Church of St Anne, commonly known as Saint Anne's Cathedral, is the Cathedral of the Diocese of Leeds, part of the parish of Mother of Unfailing Help and the seat of the Bishop of Leeds.
Leeds General Infirmary Chapel		Great George Street; LS1 3EX	Non-denominational	I	1868	In the centre of the (Grade I listed) old buildings of the LGI, dedicated to St Luke.
Leeds Minster (Minster and Parish Church of St Peter at Leeds)		Kirkgate; LS2 7DJ	Church of England	I	1841	Formerly Leeds Parish Church, before becoming a Minster in 2012. Now an important church for the new Diocese of Leeds, though neither a cathedral nor a pro-cathedral.
Mill Hill Unitarian Chapel		36 Lower Basinghall Street; LS1 5JA	Unitarian	II*	1848	Faces onto City Square, about 200 yards to the north of the current Mill Hill
St George's Church		Great George Street; LS1 3BR	Church of England	I	1838	Near to Leeds General Infirmary. Its spire was blown down in 1962 and replaced in January 2006.

=== Clifford ===
Name	Image	Location	Denomination	Grade	Opened	Notes
Clifford Methodist Church		Nursery Way; LS23 6HF	Methodist		1848	The church is situated on Nursery Way close to the centre of the village and is part of the Tadcaster Circuit. It incorporates the Methodist church which closed in neighbouring Bramham in 2010. Though similar in age to the other churches in Clifford, it is not a Listed Building.
St Edward King and Confessor		Chapel Lane; LS23 6HU	Roman Catholic	II*	1859	Building began in 1845 on the site of a former Wesleyan Chapel, consecrated 1859, tower finished 1866. Unusually for an English village, the Catholic church is the "dominant building".
St Luke's Church		Bramham Road; LS23 6SL	Church of England	II*	1842	At the western end of the village, part of the New Ainsty Deanery in the Diocese of York.

=== Collingham ===
Name	Image	Location	Denomination	Grade	Opened	Notes
Collingham Methodist Church		Harewood Road; LS22 5BL	Methodist			The church is part of the Tadcaster Methodist Circuit. It is also known as "The Ramblers' Church".
St. Oswald's Church		Church Lane; LS22 5AU	Church of England	II		Parish church of Collingham with Harewood.

=== Colton ===
Name	Image	Location	Denomination	Grade	Opened	Notes
Colton Methodist Church		Chapel Yard/Meynell Road; LS15 9AH	Methodist		1980's	The church was in the former Richmond Hill Methodist Circuit, later renamed Leeds East Circuit, and is now part of the Leeds North and East Methodist Circuit; it is also part of Churches Together in Leeds 15.

=== Cookridge ===
Name	Image	Location	Denomination	Grade	Opened	Notes
Cookridge Methodist Church		Tinshill Road, LS16 7DF (corner with Otley Old Road)	Methodist		1962	Architects: W F Dawson and Bennett. The church was part of the Leeds (Headingley and West) circuit and is now part of the Leeds South and West Methodist Circuit.
Grace Community Church (Leeds North)		Cookridge Village Hall; 45 Moseley Wood Walk; LS16 7HQ	Non-denominational			Part of the Yorkshire Gospel Partnership.
Holy Trinity Church		Tinshill Lane, LS16 7LW	Church of England		1962	Architects: Jones, Stocks & Partners

=== Cottingley ===
Name	Image	Location	Denomination	Grade	Opened	Notes
Cottingley Church		115 Cottingley Approach; LS11 0HJ	Church of England, United Reformed Church and Methodist		1981	Shared church also serves as a community centre. Part of the Anglican parish of Beeston, along with St Mary's, Beeston, and also part of the Leeds South and West Methodist Circuit (formerly Leeds South Circuit). Pastoral support is provided by the URC minister.

=== Cross Gates ===
Name	Image	Location	Denomination	Grade	Opened	Notes
Christ Church		Sandiford Close, LS15 8EY	Evangelical		1960	On the corner with Manston Gardens. The Free Church of England (Evangelical Connexion)
Church of Jesus Christ of Latter-Day Saints		Kingswear Parade, LS15 8LH	Mormon			On the corner with the Ring Road A6120
Cross Gates Methodist Church		Austhorpe Rd; LS15 8QR	Methodist		1893	Designed by architect G F Danby, opened 13 May 1893, replacing the former Wesleyan church on an adjacent site. Opposite the Cross Gates Centre and is part of the Leeds (North and East) Methodist Circuit (formerly Leeds East Circuit). Scheduled to close after a final service on Sunday 27 September 2026.
St James the Great Church		Church Lane, Manston, LS15 8JB	Church of England	II	1913	Replaced smaller 1847 building, in Decorated Gothic style by Leeds architect H. S. Chorley.
St Theresa of the Child Jesus Church		Station Road, LS15 7JY	Catholic		1953	The church is situated opposite Cross Gates railway station and since 2011 has been part of the parish of Blessed John Henry Newman.

=== Cross Green ===
Name	Image	Location	Denomination	Grade	Opened	Notes
St. Hilda's		Cross Green Lane, LS9 0DG	Church of England	II	1882	Building fund opened in 1845. Built by Yorkshire architect J. T. Micklethwaite for Anglo-Catholic worship. Church is affiliated to the Mission Society of St. Wilfrid and St Hilda and to Forward in Faith.

=== Drighlington ===
Name	Image	Location	Denomination	Grade	Opened	Notes
Drighlington Methodist Church		King St; BD11 1EL	Methodist		1996	Part of the North Kirklees and Morley Methodist Circuit.
Moorside Church		Moorside Road; BD11 1JB	Evangelical			
St Paul's Church		Whitehall Road East; BD11 1LJ	Church of England	II	1876	Designed by architect William Swinden Barber. Part of the United Benefice of Drighlington and Gildersome.

=== East End Park ===
Name	Image	Location	Denomination	Grade	Opened	Notes
Wat Matchimaram		Londesboro Grove (entrance) / Londesboro Terrace (postal address) LS9 9NE	Buddhist		22 April 2016	Temple and residence for Thai monks. Formerly Mencap support centre: the rest of the building is still used as Mencap's Hawthorn Family Support Centre. Looks out onto East Park Parade.

=== East Keswick ===
Name	Image	Location	Denomination	Grade	Opened	Notes
East Keswick Methodist Church		Main Street; LS17 9EJ	Methodist		1891	Part of the Tadcaster Methodist Circuit. Built "To The Glory of God", and as a memorial to Joseph Laurence, whose academy trained young men for the Methodist Ministry.
St Mary Magdalene Church		Moor Lane; LS17 9ES	Church of England		1957	Built as a Chapel of Ease to the Parish Church in Harewood, now part of the parish of Bardsey.

=== Farnley ===
Name	Image	Location	Denomination	Grade	Opened	Notes
St Makarios the Great (formerly St Michael and All Angels) Church		Lawns Lane; LS12 5ET	Romanian Orthodox	II	1885	Formerly Church of England until 2010. The Anglican congregation relocated to St Michael's Community Church which meets in Hillside Community Centre. The building transferred to the Romanian Orthodox Church on 20 October 2011, an iconostasis (rood screen) consistent with the style of the building and the existing furniture was sculpted in oak in Romania and was installed on Good Friday in 2013, and repairs were completed in July 2015. The parish covers Yorkshire and Greater Manchester and falls under the jurisdiction of the Romanian Orthodox Metropolis of Western and Southern Europe based in Paris.
St Wilfrid's Church		Whincover Drive; LS12 5JW	Roman Catholic		1957	The church has been used by St. Mary's Syro Malabar Catholic Mission since 18 October 2015.

=== Farsley ===
Name	Image	Location	Denomination	Grade	Opened	Notes
Church of Jesus Christ of the Latter-day Saints		80 Priesthorpe Road; LS28 5JR	Mormon		1989	On the junction of Priesthorpe Road and the A6120 Leeds Ring Road
Church of St John the Evangelist		New Street; LS28 5DJ	Church of England	II	1843	On the junction of New Street and Old Road. The church has a stained glass window which depicts the figure of Christ in Australian shepherd's garb. Supported by the Friends of St. John's, a secular society working to conserve the historic building and its heritage.
Farsley Community Church		Back Lane; LS28 5EU	Methodist/Baptist		1827	After the Baptist Church on Bryan Street, Farsley closed down in 2004, the local Baptist congregation signed an agreement with the Methodist church on Back Lane to allow them to share the facilities and use of the church. Part of the Leeds South and West Methodist Circuit, formerly part of the Leeds (Wesley) Circuit.

=== Fulneck ===
Name	Image	Location	Denomination	Grade	Opened	Notes
Fulneck Moravian Church		Fulneck; LS28 8NT	Moravian Church	I	1744	The church is situated in the Fulneck Moravian Settlement

=== Garforth ===
Name	Image	Location	Denomination	Grade	Opened	Notes
Garforth Evangelical Church		Salem Place; 1 Wakefield Road; LS25 1AN	Evangelical		1872	Opened 1872 as a Salem Chapel (Methodist) on the left, closed 1969. After commercial use, it was bought the 1980s by Garforth Evangelical Church, who added a brick extension.
Garforth Library		Main Street				The Dayspring Church, part of the Pioneer Church Network, worship first and third Sundays of the month at Garforth Library.
Garforth Methodist Church		Church Lane; LS25 1NW	Methodist		1872	Originally a Wesleyan Chapel. Formerly known as Brunswick Methodist Church until congregations from two other Methodist churches in Garforth amalgamated as their buildings went to other uses. Part of the Leeds North and East Methodist Circuit, formerly Leeds East Circuit.
St Benedict's Church		Aberford Road; LS25 1PX	Roman Catholic		1998	The first church on this site was built in 1964 but blew down the week before its official opening. A second building, made out of wood and glass, had to be demolished in 1994. The present church, designed by Vincente Steinlet, was opened on 11 July 1998.
St Mary's Church		Church Lane; LS25 1NR	Church of England	II	1844 or 1845	Church of St Mary the Blessed Virgin. Architect G. F. Jones in Early English style. Magnesian limestone, slate roof.

=== Gildersome ===
Name	Image	Location	Denomination	Grade	Opened	Notes
Ebenezer Methodist Church		Town End; LS27 7HF	Methodist		1886	The church is part of the North Kirklees and Morley Circuit.
Gildersome Baptist Church		Church Street	Baptist	II	1866	
Gildersome Meeting		75 Street Lane; LS27 7HX	Quaker	II	1756	There was previously a Meeting House at The Nooks in Gildersome, which was built in 1709 and had been sold by 1757.
St Peter's Church		Church View; LS27 7AF	Church of England			Part of the United Benefice of Drighlington and Gildersome.

=== Gipton ===
Name	Image	Location	Denomination	Grade	Opened	Notes
Church of the Epiphany		Beech Lane; LS9 6SW	Church of England	I	1938	The church was designed by Nugent Cachemaille-Day and completed in 1938 with the construction of the surrounding estate.
St Nicholas Church		Oakwood Lane; LS9 6QY	Catholic		1961	The church is part of the parish of Blessed Edmund Sykes and was built to serve the area's large Irish population.

=== Guiseley ===
Name	Image	Location	Denomination	Grade	Opened	Notes
Guiseley Baptist Church		Oxford Road; LS20 9AS	Baptist		1883	The date in the lower half of the circular window in the image is 1883. The Church and its adjacent Sunday School building are not listed, but they are identified in the local Conservation Area Appraisal as "making a positive contribution to the special character of the residential town".
Guiseley Methodist Church		Oxford Road	Methodist			The church is part of the Wharfedale and Aireborough Circuit.
St Oswald's Church, Guiseley		The Green	Church of England	I		Part of the parish of Guiseley with Esholt. The marriage of the parents of the Brontë sisters, Patrick Brontë and Maria Branwell, took place in the church on 29 December 1812.

=== Halton ===
Name	Image	Location	Denomination	Grade	Opened	Notes
Christ Church		Chapel Street; LS15 7RW	Methodist and United Reformed Church			A Local Ecumenical Partnership church formed in 1989, formerly part of Leeds East Circuit, now part of the Leeds North and East Methodist Circuit, and part of the Leeds URC Partnership.
Kingdom Hall		31A Chapel Street; LS15 7RN	Jehovah's Witnesses			
St Wilfrid's		Selby Road; LS15 7NP	Church of England		1939	Designed by architect A. Randall Wells, with furnishings by Eric Gill.

=== Halton Moor ===
Name	Image	Location	Denomination	Grade	Opened	Notes
Corpus Christi Church		Neville Road LS9 0HD	Roman Catholic		1962	The church was opened as a daughter church to the now closed Mount St. Mary's Church in neighbouring Richmond Hill. Clergy were from the Oblates of Mary Immaculate until 2008 and the church is now part of the parish of Blessed John Henry Newman. The church has a large high school, Corpus Christi Catholic College, and a primary school adjacent to it.

=== Harehills ===
Name	Image	Location	Denomination	Grade	Opened	Notes
Church of Jesus Christ Apostolic		50 Gledhow Road; LS8 5ES	Pentecostal		1983	On the corner with Gledhow Terrace. Originally built 1900 as a chapel for the Churches of Christ
Jamia Tul Batool Islamic Centre and Mosque		7 Beck Rd; LS8 4EJ	Islam (Sunni)			Licensed for marriages.
Markazi Jamia Masjid Bilal (Harehills Mosque)		Conway Rd; LS8 5JH	Islam (Barelvi)		1999	Moved from site on Harehills Place to present building off Harehills Lane.
Masjid Al Towbah		2 Whitfield Street; LS8 5AJ	Islam (Salafi)		2008	Al Towbah Islamic Centre functions as mosque and madrasa
Masjid-e-Quba		24 Shepherds Lane, LS8 4LH	Islam (Deobandi)		2015	Co-located with Al Hassan Education Centre.
New Testament Church of God		3 Easterly Road, LS8 2TN	Pentecostal		1984	Formerly the Third Church of Christ Scientist built in 1927, worship registration cancelled in November 1984. The New Testament Church of God was first established in Louis Street, Harehills, in 1959 and moved to this building in May 1985.
Restoration Faith Global Missions		Lupton Avenue; LS9 6ED				
Shah Jalal Mosque		25-27 Ellers Road; LS8 4JH	Islam (Deobandi)		2004	Co-located with Bangladeshi Islamic Society. Men only.
St Aidan's Church		Roundhay Road; LS8 5QD	Church of England	II*	1894	
St Augustine of Canterbury Church		Harehills Road; LS8 5HR	Catholic		1936	Consecrated in 1952. The chaplain to the Eritrean community in Leeds is also based here. Services held for Kerala Malayalam, Ukrainian and Zimbabwean communities and in Latin. Twinned with St. Thomas More Parish, Itaka, in the Diocese of Mbeya in Tanzania.
St Cyprian with St James		Coldcotes Avenue; LS9 6ND	Church of England		1959	At the corner of Bellbrooke Avenue. St Cyprian's Church originally opened as a district mission church in the parish of St Agnes, Burmantofts on 3 October 1903. The first building was a wooden hut set on brick foundations. The congregation at St Cyprian's was enlarged when St James's Church at Cross York Street, Leeds, was closed in February 1949. The church was licensed for the conduct of marriage services from 1950 and the new parish of St Cyprian with St James, Harehills, was formed in April 1959. The temporary church was replaced by the new brick church of St Cyprian with St James in 1959.
St James' University Hospital Chapel		Beckett Street; LS8 5HS	Non-denominational	II	1861	Part of St James' University Hospital
St Wilfrid's Church		Chatsworth Road; LS8 3QR	Church of England		1927	
Trinity United Church		Banstead Terrace West; LS8 5PL	United Reformed and Methodist		1983	On junction with Roundhay Road. It overlooks Banstead Park and is part of the Leeds North and East Methodist Circuit. The Zimbabwean Methodist Fellowship also meets at this church.
United Afghan Community Centre and Mosque		229 Roundhay Road; LS8 4HS	Islam (Deobandi)		2012	First floor rooms above a shop. Men only.

=== Harewood ===
Name	Image	Location	Denomination	Grade	Opened	Notes
Harewood Stupa		Grounds of Harewood House	Buddhist		2004	Buddhist monument built by monks from Bhutan. It was formally consecrated in 2005 by Lama Baso Karpo. Many Lamas from India and Nepal have visited the stupa to make offerings and lead prayers.

=== Hawksworth (LS5) ===
Name	Image	Location	Denomination	Grade	Opened	Notes
St Mary the Blessed Virgin Church		Hawksworth Avenue; LS5 3PN	Church of England	II	1935	Knapped flint with sandstone dressings and a Westmorland slate roof. One of two churches in the Parish of Moor Grange and Hawksworth Wood, the other being St Andrew the Apostle in West Park.

=== Hawksworth (LS20) ===
Name	Image	Location	Denomination	Grade	Opened	Notes
Hawksworth Methodist Church		Main Street; LS20 8NX	Methodist		1903	The church is part of the Wharfedale and Aireborough Circuit.

=== Headingley ===
Name	Image	Location	Denomination	Grade	Opened	Notes
Ebenezer Chapel		15 Grove Lane; LS6 4DP	Baptist		1967	Ebenezer Particular Baptist Chapel, affiliated to the Gospel Standard Baptists.
Hinsley Hall Chapel		62 Headingley Lane; LS6 2BX	Catholic		1998	Though originally a Methodist college, it is now owned by Leeds Catholic Diocese, who added the chapel in 1998. The chapel is dedicated to the Holy Family.
Plymouth Brethren Meeting Hall		Around 152 Otley Road; LS16 5JX	Plymouth Brethren			
South Parade Baptist Church		South Parade; LS6 3LF	Baptist		1909	Opposite the junction with St Michael's Lane. Leeds Arabic Christian Fellowship also meets at South Parade Baptist Church. Became Cornerstone Baptist Church in 2020, "one church with three sites", Cragg Hill in Horsforth, Headingley, and the Copperbeech Hub in Bramley.
St Chad's Church		Otley Road	Church of England	II*	1868	Parish church of Far Headingley. Part of Churches Together in Headingley. It has been used on many occasions as a Yorkshire Television filming location.
St Columba's Church		Headingley Lane	United Reformed		1966	Part of Churches Together in Headingley and the Leeds Partnership of United Reformed Churches. "The principal facades are to the north because they were intended to face a new Headingley bypass road which was never built." From 7 May 2022 it has been served by the Leeds URC Partnership's Ministry Team.
St Luke's Church		Alma Road; LS6 2AH	Lutheran		1985	Converted from a house
St Michael and All Angels Church		Headingley Lane	Church of England	II*	1886	Headingley parish church.
St Michael's Parish Hall		7 St Michael's Rd; LS6 3AW	Church of England			Used by Leeds Chinese Gospel Church Strings of Life Christian Ministry for Sunday services.
St Urban's Church		Grove Road LS6 4AQ	Catholic		1963	In 2010 the parishes of St Urban's, Headingley and Our Lady of Lourdes, Burley, merged as the Parish of St. Jeanne Jugan.
Wat Buddharam Thai Temple		45 Cliff Road; LS6 2ET	Buddhist			Formerly a hotel, the Cliff Lawn, and originally the house of a Victorian mill owner.

=== Holbeck ===
Name	Image	Location	Denomination	Grade	Opened	Notes
Cloverleaf Christian Centre		18 Brown Lane West; LS11 0DN	Non-denominational		2014	Headquarters of Cloverleaf World Ltd.
St. Francis of Assisi Church		Bismarck Street; LS11 6TN	Roman Catholic			Part of the parish of St. Maximillian Kolbe.

=== Horsforth ===
Name	Image	Location	Denomination	Grade	Opened	Notes
Brethren's Meeting Room		Brownberrie Lane; LS18 5HD	Plymouth Brethren		2007	Brethren's Meeting Room according to sign outside. Called Horsforth Gospel Hall by the Charity Commission, Church by Leeds City Council. Replaced an earlier Gospel Hall.
Central Methodist Church		Town Street; LS18 4AP	Methodist			The church was formerly a Primitive Methodist chapel and still retains internal signage pertaining to the Primitive Methodist church. The church was part of the Leeds (Wesley) Circuit and is now part of the Leeds South and West Methodist Circuit.
Cragg Hill Baptist Church		18 Cragg Hill; LS18 4NU	Baptist	II	1803	Part of Cornerstone Baptist Church in 2020, "one church with three sites", along with South Parade Baptist Church, Headingley, and the Copperbeech Hub in Bramley. A member of Horsforth Churches Together.
Emmanuel Baptist Church		Hall Lane; LS18 5JE	Baptist		2014	Former St Margaret's Parish Church Hall, rented from 2014, bought 2016.
Grove Methodist Church		Town Street	Methodist	II	1868	The church is part of the Leeds South and West Methodist Circuit. The church is accessible from New Street.
Kingdom Hall of the Jehovahs Witnesses		Calverley Lane	Jehovahs Witnesses			
Leeds Trinity University Chapel		Brownberrie Lane LS18 5HD	Roman Catholic		1968	Opened and dedicated on 13 July 1968 by Archbishop George Dwyer of Birmingham.
Lister Hill Baptist Church		Brownberrie Lane	Baptist			
St James' Church		Low Lane	Church of England	II	1848	
St Margaret's Church		Church Lane	Church of England	II	1877	
St Mary's Church		Broadgate Lane; LS18 4AG	Roman Catholic			Part of the parish of Our Lady of Kirkstall
Woodside Methodist Church		Outwood Lane	Methodist			The church is part of the Leeds South and West Methodist Circuit.
Willow Green Christian Fellowship		Parkside; LS18 4DJ				

=== Hunslet ===
Name	Image	Location	Denomination	Grade	Opened	Notes
Gospel Hall		Bedford Row; LS10 1BZ	Gospel Hall Assemblies		1932	
Hunslet Baptist Church		Low Road; LS10 1QR	Baptist		1837	
Hunslet Church of the Nazarene		Lupton Street; LS10 2QR	Church of the Nazarene			Successor to the Derbyshire Street Mission (1904)
Hunslet Gathering		Involve Centre; Whitfield Avenue; LS10 2QE	Church of England			"A new Anglican Church" or "church plant", led by St Luke's Holbeck (see Beeston above), which meets on the third Sunday of each month.
Hunslet Methodist Church		Telford Terrace; LS10 2HR	Methodist			The church is part of the Leeds South and West Methodist Circuit.
Leeds West Hunslet Salvation Army		Hunslet Hall Road; LS11 6QB	Salvation Army			Built prior to 1964.
St Mary the Virgin Church		Church Street	Church of England	II	1864	The spire is the only remaining original part, with the rest being rebuilt in the 20th century. John Wesley preached here on 30 July 1769.

=== Hyde Park ===
Name	Image	Location	Denomination	Grade	Opened	Notes
All Hallows Church		24 Regent Terrace; LS6 1NP	Church of England		1974	Replaced an 1886 building damaged by fire. See leodis.net Part of the benefice of Leeds St. Margaret and All Hallows. Open land in front of the church is being used to form All Hallows' Community Garden.
Bethel Apostolic Church		Victoria Road, LS6 1AS	Pentecostal	II	1886	Stone fronted, but the body of the church is in red brick
Hindu Temple		36 Alexandra Rd, LS6 1RF	Hindu		1968	Operated by Leeds Hindu Charitable Trust
Leeds Grand Mosque		9 Woodsley Road, LS6 1SN	Islam		1965	The mosque was formerly Sacred Heart Catholic Church, changed to a mosque in 1994. According to the Leeds City Council planning department, the building is "of a distinctive modernist design".
St Augustine's Church, Wrangthorn		Hyde Park Terrace; LS6 1BJ	Church of England	II	1871	Situated on the corner of Hyde Park Road and Hyde Park Terrace, funded by the Leeds Church Extension Society. Part of the benefice of Woodhouse and Wrangthorn. The parish was established in 1865.

=== Ireland Wood ===
Name	Image	Location	Denomination	Grade	Opened	Notes
Holy Name of Jesus Catholic Church		52 Otley Old Road; LS16 6HW	Roman Catholic		1953	Part of the parish of Our Lady of Kirkstall
St Paul's Church		Raynel Drive; LS16 6BS	Church of England		1965	Octagonal in form, funded by the Leeds Church Extension Society

=== Killingbeck ===
Name	Image	Location	Denomination	Grade	Opened	Notes
Killingbeck Cemetery Chapel		York Road	Roman Catholic			Located at centre of Killingbeck Cemetery. The cemetery was established by the Catholic Burial Board in 1895.

=== Kirkstall ===
Name	Image	Location	Denomination	Grade	Opened	Notes
Church of Jesus Christ of Latter Day Saints		Vesper Road; LS5 3NX	Mormon			Known as Leeds First Ward. A ward is a local congregation in the LDS Church.
Redeemed Christian Church of God		15-17 Walter Street LS4 2BB	Pentecostal			Also known as the Everlasting Father's Assembly, and the building as the Land of Mercy.
St Stephen's Church, Kirkstall		Morris Lane; LS5 3HF	Church of England	II	1829	Situated on high ground overlooking Kirkstall Abbey.

=== Kippax ===
Name	Image	Location	Denomination	Grade	Opened	Notes
Kippax Methodist Church		Chapel Lane LS25 7HA	Methodist		1970s	The church is part of the Aire and Calder Methodist Circuit. The current building replaced the now-demolished Wesleyan Chapel on the opposite side of the road.
St Mary's Church		Leeds Road LS25 7HF	Church of England	I	1125	Extensive 19th century restoration; part of the Team Benefice of Allerton Bywater, Kippax and Swillington. The church contains the remains of an Anglo-Danish Cross shaft.

=== Lincoln Green ===
Name	Image	Location	Denomination	Grade	Opened	Notes
Achiever's Faith		Cherry Row, LS9 7LY	Pentecostal		2006	The chapel is a room above the cafes
Lincoln Green Mosque		Cherry Row, LS9 7LY	Sunni Islam		2009	The mosque is located by the junction with Lincoln Road

=== Little London ===
Name	Image	Location	Denomination	Grade	Opened	Notes
All Souls' Church		Blackman Lane, LS7 1LW	Church of England	II*	1880	Built by public subscription in one of the poorest districts of Leeds, and designed by Sir George Gilbert Scott.
Little London Community Centre		Oatland Lane, LS7 1SP	Evangelical			Resurrection Power of Jesus Ministry meets on Fridays and Sundays.

=== Mabgate ===
Name	Image	Location	Denomination	Grade	Opened	Notes
New City of David Ministries		62 Mabgate LS9 7DZ	Nondenominational Christian			
United Church of the Kingdom of God		12 Regent Street LS2 7QA	Nondenominational Christian		2015	
Wings of Refuge Ministries		22 Regent Street LS2 7QA	Nondenominational Christian			

=== Meanwood ===
Name	Image	Location	Denomination	Grade	Opened	Notes
Holy Trinity Church		Church Lane; LS6 4NP	Church of England	II	1864	Meanwood Methodist Church now also worships at Holy Trinity Church.
Kingdom Hall of Jehovah's Witnesses		Stainbeck Road; LS7 2QY	Jehovah's Witnesses			
Meanwood Methodist Church		Monkbridge Road, junction with Green Road, LS6 4HH	Methodist, now Iglesia ni Cristo	II	1881, extended 1886	The church and its extension were both designed by Leeds-based architect William Hill. Formerly part of the Leeds South and West Methodist circuit, the church was closed in October 2014 and the church community now worships at Holy Trinity Church in Meanwood. The building is now used by the Iglesia ni Cristo church.
Meanwood Valley Baptist Church		c/o Meanwood Valley Urban Farm, Sugarwell Road, Meanwood LS7 2QG	Baptist			The church meets at Meanwood Valley Urban Farm EpiCentre most Sunday mornings.
Stainbeck United Reformed Church		Stainbeck Road; LS7 2PP	United Reformed Church		1931	By the corner with Stainbeck Lane. Part of the Leeds Mission and Care Group of URC churches. From 7 May 2022 it has been served by the Leeds URC Partnership's Ministry Team.

=== Methley ===
Name	Image	Location	Denomination	Grade	Opened	Notes
Methley Methodist Church		Main Street, Mickletown, LS26 9JE	Methodist		1888	The church is part of the Aire and Calder Methodist Circuit.
Saint Oswald's Church		Church Side, LS26 9BJ	Church of England	I	14th century	Parish church. Formerly had a spire, but this was removed for safety in 1937.

=== Micklefield ===
Name	Image	Location	Denomination	Grade	Opened	Notes
St Mary the Virgin		Old Great North Road; LS25 4AG	Church of England		1861	Located in the northern part of the village known as "Old Micklefield". Part of the benefice of Aberford with Micklefield and the Sherburn in Elmet Group of Parishes. The church has a memorial to the 63 victims of the Peckfield Colliery disaster and a plaque dedicated to the victims' widows. On the site of a former Chapel of Ease, demolished 1860.

=== Middleton ===
Name	Image	Location	Denomination	Grade	Opened	Notes
Middleton Park Baptist Church		Middleton Park Avenue; LS10 4HT	Baptist			The church is situated on Middleton Park Avenue in the heart of the Middleton council estate.
St. Cross Church		Middleton Park Avenue	Church of England		1933	Funded by the Leeds Church Extension Society, the church was opened in 1933 to serve the new Middleton council estate. In 1935 it became a separate parish rather than a mission church of St. Mary's.
St. Mary the Virgin Church		Town Street	Church of England	II	1846	The church was completed in 1846; prior to that Middleton was in the parish of Rothwell.
St Phillip's Church		St Philip's Avenue	Catholic			The church is part of the parish of St. Margaret Clitherow and situated on St. Philip's Avenue to the north of the Estate.

=== Moortown and Moor Allerton ===
Name	Image	Location	Denomination	Grade	Opened	Notes
Baab-ul-Ilm Mosque		166 Shadwell Lane; LS17 8AD	Muslim		2004	Name means "Gateway to Knowledge" and incorporates facilities for prayers, educational and social activities. Next door to the Lubavitch Centre and opposite the UHC synagogue.
Beth Hamidrash Hagadol Synagogue		399 Street Lane; LS17 6HQ	Orthodox Judaism		1969	Previously located at Templar Street in the original Jewish quarter in Leeds (1874), then in St. Alban's Street until 1886, then in Upper Hope Street, then moved to Newton Road, Chapeltown (1937), then to current location in 1969.
Etz Chaim Synagogue		411 Harrogate Road; LS17 7BY	Orthodox Judaism		1981	Architect: Stuart Leventhall
Immaculate Heart of Mary Church		294 Harrogate Road; LS17 6LE	Roman Catholic		1959	Immaculate Heart parish was the first new parish to be established in Leeds after the Second World War. Two mass centres, the Queen's Arms in Harrogate Road and the Corner House Social Club in Moortown, were previously in use and from 1945 The Grange, now part of St Gemma's Hospice, was used. The present church was consecrated in 1959. Now part of the Parish of Saint John Mary Vianney.
Iqra Centre		4-6 Carr Manor Crescent; LS17 5DH	Muslim		2001	A branch of the UK Islamic Mission (UKIM).
Lingfield Centre		Lingfield Hill LS17 7EJ	Muslim		2016	Community centre including prayer room for 70 worshippers, also part of the UK Islamic Mission.
Lubavitch Centre		168 Shadwell Lane; LS17 8AD	Orthodox Judaism		1986	Opened as a cultural centre here in 1986. Date of commencement as a synagogue not known. Notable for its large Hanukkah menorah.
Moortown Baptist Church		204 King Lane; LS17 6AA	Baptist			Corner of King Lane and Stonegate Road
Moortown Methodist Church Centre		Alderton Rise; LS17 5LH	Currently used by Showers of Mercy Ministries International, Lighthouse Chapel and Leeds Independent Seventh Day Adventist Church.		1953	Not used for Methodist services since September 2015. The North Leeds Foodbank used the premises for food distribution until February 2019.
St Gemma's Hospice Chapel		329 Harrogate Road; LS17 6QD	Non-denominational		1982	The Hospice Chapel is in the main reception area: a multi-faith space open for anyone to use day or night. Regular Roman Catholic, Church of England and Methodist/Free Church services.
St John the Evangelist Church		Harrogate Road; LS17 7BZ	Church of England	II	1853	Part of the Moor Allerton and Shadwell Team Ministry. The adjacent Church Hall, originally a school room, was built in the same style as the church but opened two years later in 1855.
St Stephen's Church		Cranmer Road; LS17 5PX	Church of England		1954	The church is situated off King Lane and was built to serve the Moor Allerton council estate. Part of the Moor Allerton and Shadwell parish and served by the Moor Allerton and Shadwell Team Ministry. A cross outside the church commemorates a Franciscan Mission held at the church in September 1964.
UHC Synagogue		151 Shadwell Lane; LS17 8DW	Orthodox Judaism		1986	Formerly the United Hebrew Congregation Leeds synagogue

=== Morley ===
Name	Image	Location	Denomination	Grade	Opened	Notes
Central Methodist Church		Wesley Street; LS27 9EE	Methodist	II	1862	The church, originally known as Queen Street Wesleyan Methodist Church, forms part of the North Kirklees and Morley Methodist Circuit
Church of Jesus Christ of Latter Day Saints		63 Bridge Street; LS27 OEX	Mormon			
Newlands Methodist Church		Albert Drive; LS27 8SE	Methodist			The church forms part of the North Kirklees and Morley Methodist Circuit
St Andrew's Church		St Andrew's Avenue, Bruntcliffe	Church of England		1891	Part of the benefice of Morley.
St Francis of Assisi Church		Corporation Street, Morley	Roman Catholic			Part of the Parish of St William of York and the Leeds South West Deanery.
St Mary in the Woods Church		Troy Road; LS27 8HY	United Reformed	II	1878	
St Paul's Church		King Street; LS27 9ES	Church of England			Parish legal name is St. Paul, Morley, Townend. Known as "the church on the spoil heap", as the hill on which it stands is not a natural hill but the spoil heap of Morley Railway Tunnel. Part of the benefice of Morley.
St Peter's Church		Rooms Lane; LS27 9NX	Church of England	II	1840s	The church is a commissioners' church. A charismatic/evangelical church, part of the benefice of Morley.

=== New Farnley ===
Name	Image	Location	Denomination	Grade	Opened	Notes
St James' and St Michael's Church		Whitehall Road LS12 5AA	Church of England		1959	Image shows St James' church, which is now a multi-purpose community building including St James' and St Michael's church services. Part of the Benefice of Wortley and Farnley.

=== Osmondthorpe ===
Name	Image	Location	Denomination	Grade	Opened	Notes
St Philip's Church		86 Osmondthorpe Lane, LS9 9EF	Church of England		1933	Architect F. L. Charlton. Early English style: brick facings over reinforced concrete arched trusses. Awarded the RIBA West Yorkshire Medal in 1936. The altar and interior woodwork are by Robert Thompson, the 'Mouseman'.

=== Otley ===
Name	Image	Location	Denomination	Grade	Opened	Notes
All Saints' Church		Kirkgate	Church of England	I		The 'Navvies Monument', a monument to the navvies who died building the Bramhope Tunnel, is situated outside the church.
Beech Hill Church		20-24 Beech Hill, Westgate; LS21 3AS	Evangelical	II	2021	Formerly Artamis Gifts, Carole's Dress Shop and Beech Hill Studios, became home to Beech Hill Church (the new name for Bethel Evangelical Church) in 2021. Listed building along with the property at 18 Beech Hill.
Bridge Street United Reformed Church		Bridge Street; LS21 1RW	United Reformed	II	1899	The church was a Congregational church, known as the Duncan Cathedral, prior to the formation of the United Reformed Church in 1972.
Cross Green Gospel Hall		Cross Green	Brethren			This was originally a Quaker Meeting House built in the 1890s.
Otley Courthouse		Courthouse Street; LS21 3AN				Otley Quakers meet at the former Courthouse on the last Sunday of each month.
Otley Methodist Church		Walkergate; LS21 1HB	Methodist	II	1870s	The church is part of the eastern cluster of Wharfedale and Aireborough Circuit. As of November 2022 the property is for sale.
Otley Spiritualist Church		New Market	Spiritualist			
Our Lady and All Saints Catholic Church		Bridge Street	Roman Catholic			

=== Oulton ===
Name	Image	Location	Denomination	Grade	Opened	Notes
Oulton Methodist Church		63 Aberford Road; LS26 8HS	Methodist		1860	
St John the Evangelist's Church		Leeds Road; LS26 8JU	Church of England	II*	1829	Currently (2018) not in use due to water damage dating from 2014, but under repair.

=== Pool-in-Wharfedale ===
Name	Image	Location	Denomination	Grade	Opened	Notes
Pool-in-Wharfedale Methodist Church		Main Street	Methodist			The church is part of the Wharfedale and Aireborough Circuit.
St Wilfrid's Church		Main Street	Church of England	II	1840s	

=== Potternewton ===
Name	Image	Location	Denomination	Grade	Opened	Notes
Harehills Lane Baptist Church		Harehills Lane; LS8 4HA	Baptist		1928	
St Martin's Church		St Martin's View; LS7 3LB	Church of England	II	1881	The church was designed by Park Row-based architectural consultants Adams and Kelly, and built between 1879 and 1881. It was consecrated by the Bishop of Ripon on 19 April 1881. The altar came from the demolished Christ Church in Meadow Lane, Hunslet in 1973, and the stone war memorial on the south side of the churchyard came from St Clement's Church in Sheepscar in 1974.
Three Hierarchs Church		Harehills Avenue; LS8 4HD	Greek Orthodox (formerly Methodist)	II	1906	

=== Pudsey ===
Name	Image	Location	Denomination	Grade	Opened	Notes
Kingdom Hall		Richardshaw Lane; LS28 7ND	Jehovah's Witnesses			West side, on the corner with Primrose Hill.
Pudsey United Reformed Church		School Street; LS28 8PN	United Reformed Church			
St Andrew's Church		Robin Lane; LS28 7BR	Methodist		1901	The church is part of the Leeds South and West Circuit and was originally a Primitive Methodist church.
St Joseph's Church		The Lanes; LS28 7AZ	Roman Catholic			The church is of twentieth century build and is situated on The Lanes, away from the centre of Pudsey. It serves the Catholic community living in Pudsey, Swinnow, Stanningley, Farsley, Woodhall, Fulneck and Troydale.
St Lawrence and St. Paul's Church		Church Lane LS28 8BE	Church of England	II	1821	The church is Pudsey parish church and a Commissioners' church

=== Rawdon ===
Name	Image	Location	Denomination	Grade	Opened	Notes
Friends Meeting House (Quaker)		Quakers Lane; LS19 6HU	Society of Friends	II	1697	
St Peter's Church		Town Street; LS19 6QZ	Church of England	II	1684	
Trinity Church		Aireborough New Road Side; LS19 6QZ	Baptist, Methodist and United Reformed	II	1846	This church is the former Benton Congregational Church (1846), being renamed in 1972 by the three groups who now share it.

=== Richmond Hill ===
Name	Image	Location	Denomination	Grade	Opened	Notes
Christ Temple of Worship Church		20 Shannon Street; LS9 8SS	Pentecostal			Registered Charity no. 1154417 details
Deeper Life Bible Church		18 Shannon Road; LS9 8SS	Evangelical		2006	Began as a group at the University of Leeds in 1991, then used various rooms, getting its own premises in 2006.
Glory Fire Church		Curtis House Business Centre, 4 Berking Avenue; LS9 9LF				Part of the ‘Supernatural Global Network’ family of churches under the "spiritual covering" of Apostle Guillermo Maldonado and King Jesus International Ministry, Miami, USA.
Newbourne Methodist Church		Upper Accommodation Road, LS9 8JL	Methodist		1971	The church is part of the Leeds North and East Methodist Circuit (formerly Leeds East Circuit), and is also used by God's International Deliverance Church (GIDC) for services conducted in Ghanaian
St Saviour Church		Ellerby Road	Church of England	I	1845	

=== Rothwell ===
Name	Image	Location	Denomination	Grade	Opened	Notes
Holy Trinity Church		Wood Lane; LS26 0QL	Church of England	II	1873	There has been a church since 1150, but the current building dates mainly from 1873.
Rothwell Baptist Church		Wood Lane; LS26 0PG	Baptist			Between Wood Lane and Haigh Road. A hall has existed there for over 90 years, but the present building dates from 2008.
Rothwell Methodist Church		Butcher Hill; LS26 0DB	Methodist			The church is part of the Aire and Calder Methodist Circuit.
St Mary's Church		40 Park Lane; LS26 0ES	Roman Catholic			

=== Roundhay ===
Name	Image	Location	Denomination	Grade	Opened	Notes
Leeds-Oakwood Christadelphians		North Lane; LS8 2LX	Christadelphian		Mid-1960's	The congregation was formed in 1940 and met initially in rented rooms in Chapel Allerton and Oakwood.
Lidgett Lane Community Centre		Lidgett Lane Community Centre, Lidgett Lane; LS17 6QP	Nondenominational Christianity			All Nations Community Church uses a room in the Community Centre on Sundays.
Lidgett Park Methodist Church		Lidgett Place; LS8 1HS	Methodist	II	1926	The church is part of the Leeds North and East Methodist Circuit and the Circuit Office is based there. The church produces a monthly magazine called The Link. Ecumenical partnerships are in place with St Edmunds and St Andrews.
Oakwood Church		Springwood Road; LS8 2QA	Methodist and Church of England		1986	A Methodist-Anglican Partnership, joint with St John's Church of England Parish, in the Methodist church building (formerly Roundhay Methodist Church) since 1 December 2013. Part of the Leeds North and East Methodist Circuit.
Roundhay Parochial Hall		Fitzroy Drive; LS8 4AB	Muslim and Evangelical		1928	Hosts worship by the Ahmadiyyah Muslim Association UK on Fridays and Roundhay Evangelical Church on Sundays.
Quaker Meeting House		136 Street Lane; LS8 2BW	Quaker		1957	Converted bungalow (1931)
Sinai Synagogue		Roman Avenue; LS8 2AN	Reform Judaism		1960	Designed by Halpern & Associates of London. Extended 1985.
St Andrew's Church		Shaftsbury Avenue; LS8 1DS	United Reformed	II	1908	In ecumenical partnership with Lidgett Park Methodist Church. Part of the Leeds Mission and Care Group (URC) and the Leeds Dementia Alliance. From 7 May 2022 it has been served by the Leeds URC Partnership's Ministry Team.
St Edmund's Church		Lidgett Park Road; LS8 1JN	Church of England	II	1910	In ecumenical partnership with Lidgett Park Methodist Church.
Third Church of Christ, Scientist		Devonshire Croft, Devonshire Lane; LS8 1AY	Christian Science		1990s	

=== Scholes ===
Name	Image	Location	Denomination	Grade	Opened	Notes
Scholes Methodist Church		Main Street LS15 4DJ	Methodist		1879	The church is part of the Leeds North and East Methodist Circuit, formerly Leeds East Circuit.
St Philip's Church		Main Street LS15 4DJ	Church of England		1966	

=== Scott Hall ===
Name	Image	Location	Denomination	Grade	Opened	Notes
Potternewton Centre		Potternewton View; LS7 2DW	Baptist			Used by Chapel Allerton Baptist Church (Chapel A) as its Sunday venue since 2017; previously the church met at Chapel Allerton Primary School. Chapel A is part of the Yorkshire Baptist Association and the Baptist Union of Great Britain.
Scott Hall Church		9 Scott Hall Grove, LS7 3JH	Evangelical		1970s	Previously Scott Hall Christian Fellowship

=== Seacroft ===
Name	Image	Location	Denomination	Grade	Opened	Notes
Church of the Ascension		Ironwood Approach LS14 6EW	Forward in Faith		1961	It is still owned by the Church of England although they have vacated it as of January 2012 (reducing their number of churches on the estate from three to two). It is now used by Forward in Faith.
Our Lady of Good Counsel		Kentmere Avenue; LS14 6QY	Roman Catholic		1954	The parish was established as an offshoot of St Theresa's in Cross Gates in 1954. The first services were held in a builders’ canteen using the oven as an improvised altar. Later the newly completed school hall was used. The church uses an Italian Romanesque style and was designed by Desmond Williams of architects Arthur Farebrother & Partners. It opened in 1960. Part of the parish of Blessed Edmund Sykes.
Seacroft Congregational Church		134 Brooklands Avenue; LS14 6RS	United Reformed		1951	Seacroft Congregational Church is on Brooklands Avenue and was built in 1951 along with the surrounding estate.
Seacroft Methodist Church		1081 York Road; LS14 6JB	Methodist		1980	The church is part of the Leeds North and East Methodist Circuit, formerly Leeds East Circuit. The new church was built as an extension to the 1874 building, which is now used by Chapel FM. A community organisation, South Seacroft Friends and Neighbours shares the use of the premises.
St James' Church		Seacroft Green; LS14 6JJ	Church of England	II	1846	The church sits on the village green and dates from the area's days as a village before the development of the Seacroft estate.
St Richard's Church		Kentmere Avenue; LS14 1BN	Church of England		c1950s	The church is situated on the corner of Kentmere Avenue and Ramshead Hill. Along with St Paul's at Whinmoor it forms part of the Parish of St James.

=== Shadwell ===
Name	Image	Location	Denomination	Grade	Opened	Notes
Shadwell Methodist Church		Main Street, LS17 8HN	Methodist		1892	The original chapel (1814) is now the library.
St Paul's Church		Main Street LS17 8HD	Church of England	II	1842	Part of the Moor Allerton and Shadwell Team Ministry.

=== Sheepscar ===
Name	Image	Location	Denomination	Grade	Opened	Notes
Divine Exchange Christian Centre		27 Sheepscar Street South; LS7 1AD	Non-denominational			Formerly at 19 Sheepscar Street
Dunamis International Gospel Centre		Sterling House; 1 Sheepscar Court; Northside Business Park; LS7 2BB	Pentecostal			
His Majesties House		8-10 Chapeltown Road	Non-denominational			Meets at Ramgarhia Sports Centre on Sunday afternoons, entrance is on Roundhay Road
Leeds Central Seventh-day Adventist Church		169 Meanwood Rd; LS7 1JW	Seventh-day Adventist		(1894)	Originally a Primitive Methodist Chapel, which was opened in 1894
D.T.H. Trinity Eritrean Orthodox Tewahedo Church		25 Education Road; LS7 2AL	Eritrean Orthodox Tewahedo Church			
Mountain of Fire and Miracles		62B Roseville Road; LS8 5DR	Non-denominational			Part of Mountain of Fire and Miracles International
Redeemed Christian Church of God Power Connections Church		236 Meanwood Road; LS7 2AH	Evangelical			
The Redeemed Evangelical Mission - City of Praise		5 Sheepscar Court, Meanwood Road; LS7 2BB	Evangelical			Formerly at 12 Sheepscar Street South

=== Stanningley ===
Name	Image	Location	Denomination	Grade	Opened	Notes
St John's Methodist Church		Bright Street; LS28 6NJ	Methodist		1886	
St Thomas' Church		Town Street; LS28 6NB	Church of England	II	1841	
The Oak Church		54, Bradford Road; LS28 6EF	Evangelical		2015	Part of Mosaic Church, Leeds. A weekly foodbank also operates from the church building.

=== Swarcliffe ===
Name	Image	Location	Denomination	Grade	Opened	Notes
St Gregory's Church		Swarcliffe Drive, LS14 5AW	Roman Catholic		1970	Since 2011 the church has been part of the parish of Blessed John Henry Newman.
Swarcliffe Baptist Church		Mill Green Road, LS14 5JU	Baptist		1970s	On the corner of Mill Green Road and Mill Green Place. Part wooden and part brick. Also known as Swarcliffe Streams Baptist Church. The church was established in 1957.

=== Swillington ===
Name	Image	Location	Denomination	Grade	Opened	Notes
St Mary's Church		Wakefield Road, LS26 8DS	Church of England	II	c. 1360	Part of the Team Benefice of Allerton Bywater, Kippax and Swillington.

=== Swinnow ===
Name	Image	Location	Denomination	Grade	Opened	Notes
Christ the Saviour Church		1 Swinnow Walk, LS13 4NP	Church of England		1959	Part of the parish of St Thomas, Stanningley
St Mark's Methodist Church		Swinnow Lane LS13 4RG	Methodist			Part of the Leeds South and West Methodist Circuit

=== Thorner ===
Name	Image	Location	Denomination	Grade	Opened	Notes
St Peter's Church		Church View; LS14 3ED	Church of England	II*	15th century	

=== Thorp Arch ===
Name	Image	Location	Denomination	Grade	Opened	Notes
All Saints' Church		Church Causeway; LS23 7AH	Church of England	II	12th century	The church is situated on Church Causeway outside of the village. It is of twelfth century origin, although most of the building dates from its restoration by George Edmund Street in 1871–72. Part of the Lower Wharfe Group of Parishes.
HM Prison Wealstun		Church Causeway; LS23 7AZ	Non-denominational		2005	The chapel was dedicated on 1 November 2005.

=== Tingley ===
Name	Image	Location	Denomination	Grade	Opened	Notes
Hope Church		45 Thirlmere Drive; WF3 1PU			May 2014	Part of a church planting initiative called "Connected". The address belongs to Ardsley Church of the Nazarene.
Tingley Methodist Church		Westerton Road; WF3 1BD	Methodist			Part of the Morley and North Kirklees Methodist Circuit

=== Walton ===
Name	Image	Location	Denomination	Grade	Opened	Notes
St Peter's Church		Main Street; LS23 7DJ	Church of England	II*		St. Peter's, in the Parish of Lower Wharfe, is part of the Benefice of Bramham in the Diocese of York. The church is believed to have been built in the year 1350.

=== Weetwood ===
Name	Image	Location	Denomination	Grade	Opened	Notes
Hollin House		Weetwood Avenue; LS16 5NG	Church of England			Home and office of the Bishop of Leeds: the chapel is occasionally available for use by church groups.

=== West Park ===
Name	Image	Location	Denomination	Grade	Opened	Notes
Church of the Assumption of Our Lady		Spen Lane; LS16 5EL	Roman Catholic		1957	Part of the parish of Our Lady of Kirkstall
St Andrew the Apostle		Butcher Hill, Moor Grange; LS16 5HQ	Church of England		1968	On the corner of Butcher Hill and Old Oak Drive; part of the parish of St Mary, Hawksworth Wood and served by the Abbeylands Team Ministry. There are currently no services held at this church.
West Park United Reformed Church		Spen Lane, LS16 5BB	United Reformed Church		1937	On the corner of Spen Lane and West Park Drive. Formerly West Park Congregational Church. From 7 May 2022 it has been served by the Leeds URC Partnership's Ministry Team.

=== Wetherby ===
Name	Image	Location	Denomination	Grade	Opened	Notes
Church on the Corner		Hallfield Estate	Church of England		1873	The Church on the Corner is a Church of England place of worship in the grounds of Wetherby Cemetery and built on land granted by the Burial Board. It was originally a mortuary chapel. It is situated next to a near-identical chapel of rest.
St James' Church		Church Street; LS22 6LP; 53.9298°N 1.3864°W	Church of England	II	1842	St James' Church is Wetherby's parish church and the largest church structure in the town.
St Joseph's Church		Westgate	Catholic		1882	Its extension in 1987 won the Leeds Prize for architecture that year.
Wetherby Methodist Church		Bank Street	Methodist		1829	Replaced earlier chapels on North Street (now demolished) and Victoria Street (now converted to commercial premises). The church is part of the Tadcaster Circuit. It was refurbished in 2012.
Wetherby Salvation Army Church		Campus of Wetherby High School; Hallfield Lane	Salvation Army			The buildings were formerly part of HMS Ceres.

=== Whinmoor ===
Name	Image	Location	Denomination	Grade	Opened	Notes
St. Paul's Church		Whinmoor Crescent; LS14 1EG	Church of England			Part of Seacroft Parish

=== Whitkirk ===
Name	Image	Location	Denomination	Grade	Opened	Notes
St Mary's Church		Selby Road, LS15 0AA	Church of England	I	15th Century	Parish Church.

=== Woodhouse ===
Name	Image	Location	Denomination	Grade	Opened	Notes
Ahlulbayt Cultural Centre		35 Hanover Square; LS3 1BQ	Islam Shia		1984	Formerly Hanover Square Methodist Chapel (1847). Main Iraqi/Iranian mosque in Leeds.
Blenheim Baptist Church		Blackman Lane; LS2 9ER	Baptist			Located at the base of Broadcast Tower, also known as "The Rusty Building", which is part of Leeds Beckett University. Replaced previous church building which closed in 2007. Twinned with First Baptist Church of Richardson, Texas.
Cemetery Lodge		Off Clarendon Road on the University of Leeds campus	Muslim	II		The building contains a Muslim Prayer Room for the north side of the campus.
Central Leeds (Carlton Hill) Meeting		188 Woodhouse Lane; LS2 9DX	Society of Friends		1987	Replaced the former Carlton Hill Meeting House lower down Woodhouse Lane, which is now part of Leeds Metropolitan University
Claire Chapel		Emmanuel Centre, University of Leeds, Woodhouse Lane	Christian			While the building in which it is housed is a former church, it is not as a whole a place of worship. However a small chapel has been constructed making use of one of the stained glass windows.
Gateway Church, formerly St Mark's Church		St Mark's Street; LS2 9AF	Evangelical	II	2014	Built as a Church of England Commissioners' Church in 1826, became redundant in 2005+. The church was used as the 'Parish Church of St Matthew' in The Beiderbecke Affair. Renovated and used for Gateway Church and functions including exams for the University of Leeds.
Greater World Sanctuary		14 Clarendon Road; LS2 9NN	Spiritualist	II		Grade II listed 19th century residence adapted for worship.
Notre Dame College Chapel		St Mark's Avenue; LS2 9BL	Catholic			
The Mount Faith Centre		The Mount; 44 Hyde Terrace; LS2 9LN	Christian			Part of an NHS building providing inpatient and outpatient care related to mental health. Open to all for prayer and reflection, but Christian symbols and Communion is held there, according to a notice.
University of Leeds Conference Auditorium		University of Leeds, Willow Terrace Road	Muslim			This facility of the university provides a Muslim Prayer Room for the south side of the campus

=== Woodlesford ===
Name	Image	Location	Denomination	Grade	Opened	Notes
All Saints' Church		Pottery Lane, Woodlesford	Church of England	II	1870	Due to flooding at St. John's Church, Oulton, Sunday morning worship has temporarily moved to All Saints Parish Hall in Woodlesford.
Woodlesford Methodist Church		Church Street, Woodlesford	Methodist		1817	The church is part of the Aire and Calder Methodist Circuit, formerly part of the Rothwell Circuit.

=== Wortley ===
Name	Image	Location	Denomination	Grade	Opened	Notes
Holy Family Catholic Church		Green Lane; LS12 1HU	Catholic		1895	Gothic Revival red brick with slate roof by John Kelly.
Lower Wortley Methodist Church		Branch Road, Lower Wortley, LS12 4RN	Methodist		1884	Built as a United Methodist Free Church. It acts as a distribution centre for the Leeds North and West Foodbank. Merged October 2022 with Wesley Road and Whingate Methodist Churches.
St John the Evangelist		Dixon Lane Road; LS12 4RU	Church of England			The parish covers Wortley and Farnley.

=== Yeadon ===
Name	Image	Location	Denomination	Grade	Opened	Notes
Brethren's Meeting Room		Gill Lane LS19 7DD	Plymouth Brethren			Also called Gospel Hall.
New Life Community Church		Haw Lane, LS19 7XQ	Evangelical	II	1891	Formerly St Andrew's C of E parish church, built by Thomas Healey of Bradford in 1891 in Arts and Crafts Perpendicular style.
St John the Evangelist Church		Barcroft Grove,	Church of England		1844	The church is a Commissioners' church with a grant of £300 designed by Walker Rawsthorne and completed in 1844. The chancel was added in 1893.
St Peter and Paul Church		New Road, Yeadon	Catholic		1955	
Yeadon Methodist Church		Chapel Hill, LS19 7RG	Methodist		1875	The church is part of the Wharfedale and Aireborough Circuit

== Former places of worship ==
=== Aberford ===
Name	Image	Location	Denomination	Grade	Opened	Closure	Notes
Aberford Methodist Church		Main Street South, LS25 3DA	Methodist		1912		Replaced 1814 chapel. Sold in 2017 as a house
Gascoigne Almshouses		Bunker Hill, LS25 3DF		II	1845	1976	(Now Priory Park) The almshouses had a residents' chapel at the south end (left of picture).
Lotherton Hall Chapel		Collier Lane, Aberford				1830	Twelfth century Norman chapel in the grounds of Lotherton Hall, which was in use until 1830 and renovated between 1913 and 1917, when it was used as part of a Voluntary Aid Detachment hospital.

=== Adel ===
Name	Image	Location	Denomination	Grade	Opened	Closure	Notes
Adel Reformatory Chapel		Tile Lane LS16 8EB	Church of England	II	1882	1991	The Chapel of a reformatory school operated by the Leeds Society for the Reformation of Juvenile Offenders. Later used as a lecture room and a gym. The school was founded in 1857 and the chapel was added to the south in 1882. Derelict from the 1990s. Grade II Listed Building.

=== Alwoodley ===
Name	Image	Location	Denomination	Grade	Opened	Closure	Notes
St Barnabas's Church		The View, LS17 7NA	Church of England		1930s	1963	Now used as a church hall; a new church was built alongside (left of this picture).
St Paul's Church		Buckstone Crescent, off King Lane	Roman Catholic		1953	1996	Now used as a church hall; a new church was built alongside (behind in this picture).

=== Armley ===
Name	Image	Location	Denomination	Grade	Opened	Closure	Notes
Branch Road Methodist Chapel 1877		Branch Road, LS12 3AQ	Methodist		1877	1905	The grey building on the left is the original, architect Thomas Howell. Replacement chapel to the right. The white addition is the entrance when it was converted to a cinema in 1910. Later a laundry, then a supermarket, currently unused.
Branch Road Methodist Chapel 1905		2 Branch Road, LS12 3AQ	Methodist	II	1905		Replaced the chapel next door up the hill. On junction with Stanningley Road. Mike's Carpets (now MC Carpets) since 1979
Church of the Ascension		115 Heights Drive, LS12 3TG	Church of England		1962		Most recent use as Family of God church
Methodist Free Church, Hall Lane		Hall Lane	Methodist		1897		Later Armley Congregational Church, now flats.
Methodist Free Church, Hall Road		Colton Street / Hall Road	Methodist		1900		Corner of Colton Street (left) and Hall Road (right)
Southfield Primitive Methodist Chapel		Wesley Road, LS12 1UL	Methodist		1875		Part of the former Leeds Sixth Circuit of the Primitive Methodist Church and one of the chapels used when the Primitive Methodist Conference came to Leeds in 1898. Now in commercial use.

=== Bardsey ===
Name	Image	Location	Denomination	Grade	Opened	Closure	Notes
Chapel of the Blessed Sacrament		Keswick Lane	Roman Catholic			2010	The church was served by priests from the Oblates of Mary Immaculate based at Sicklinghall, North Yorkshire

=== Barwick-in-Elmet ===
Name	Image	Location	Denomination	Grade	Opened	Closure	Notes
Methodist Chapel		Chapel Lane	Methodist		1804	1900	In use until the present Methodist Church was built (1900), later it became the Miners' Welfare Institute.

=== Beeston ===
Name	Image	Location	Denomination	Grade	Opened	Closure	Notes
Beeston Methodist Church		Town Street; LS11 8RB	Methodist		1866		Capacity 540 persons. This church replaced an earlier Wesleyan chapel in 1866.
Church of the Holy Spirit		Tempest Road; Beeston Hill LS11	Church of England	II	November 1905	May 2012	Anglo-Catholic, previously listed as the Parish Church of the Holy Trinity.
St David's Church		Dewsbury Road	Church of England		1961	22 November 2015	Designed by Geoffrey Davey. The church and adjoining church hall have been sold with potential for residential development.

=== Bramham ===
Name	Image	Location	Denomination	Grade	Opened	Closure	Notes
Bramham Methodist Church		Low Way; LS23 6QT	Methodist		1906	2010	Originally a Primitive Methodist chapel before the unification of the Methodist Church of Great Britain. Now in residential use.

=== Bramley ===
Name	Image	Location	Denomination	Grade	Opened	Closure	Notes
St Margaret's Church		Newlay Lane LS13 2AJ	Church of England		1958	2023	Situated on the Moorside Estate in Bramley. St Margaret's and St Peter's both formed the parish of Bramley, part of Churches Together around Leeds 13, until St Margaret's closed in 2023.

=== Burley ===
Name	Image	Location	Denomination	Grade	Opened	Closure	Notes
St Margaret of Antioch Church		Cardigan Road; LS6 1LJ	Church of England	II*	1909	1995	Architect Temple Moore. John Betjeman knew and admired the building. The porch, designed by George Pace, was added in the 1960s. Now home to an arts and creative space called Left Bank Leeds. The church previously occupied a temporary iron building built in 1898.

=== Burmantofts ===
Name	Image	Location	Denomination	Grade	Opened	Closure	Notes
St Patrick's		New York Road / Rider Street, Leeds LS9 7DP	Catholic	II*	1891	2001	Replaced by the new St. Patrick's Church on Torre Road

=== Calverley ===
Name	Image	Location	Denomination	Grade	Opened	Closure	Notes
Calverley Old Hall Chapel		10 Woodhall Road; LS28 5NL		I			The manor house chapel has been dated to 1485–1495. It was mentioned in the will of William Calverley c. 1488.

=== Carlton, near Rawdon ===
Name	Image	Location	Denomination	Grade	Opened	Closure	Notes
St Bartholomew's Church		Carlton Lane, East Carlton	Church of England	II	1926		Originally built in 1818 as a school, with the school master's house adjoining, it then became St Bartholomew's Church, listed as a "mission church", and is now a private house (August 2015).

=== Carlton, near Rothwell ===
Name	Image	Location	Denomination	Grade	Opened	Closure	Notes
Carlton Primitive Methodist Chapel		5 Primitive Street, Carlton, Rothwell; WF3 3QS	Primitive Methodist		Built 1853	1960s	According to Christopher Hill, "[Photographer] Keith Guyler’s notes simply say that Carlton Primitive Methodist chapel in Primitive Street was closed in the 1960s. At the time of the photograph in 1999 it was derelict, but on Google Street View in 2008 it has been impressively converted into a house. On the Leeds City Council Leodis website, however, it shows a 2005 picture of the building undergoing renovation. It is labelled as the Primitive Methodist Sunday School and says that the Primitive Methodist Chapel stood to the right of it and has since been demolished. It was built in 1867 on land donated by Mr. Horn of Fleet Mills." Leeds City Council's Public Access for Planning site records that a "change of use involving alterations of former chapel to 5 bedroom dwelling house" was approved on 14 December 2004.

=== Chapeltown ===
Name	Image	Location	Denomination	Grade	Opened	Closure	Notes
House of Faith		21 Leopold Street; LS7 4DA	Jewish, Islam		1924	1974	Blue Plaque reads: "Built soon after 1860 for residents of the affluent middle class suburb, in 1924 it became a Spanish and Portuguese Synagogue, and from 1952 to 1960 the Sinai Reform Synagogue. From 1961 to 1974, as the Jinnah Mosque, it was the first mosque in Leeds." It is now flats.
New Synagogue		98 Chapeltown Road; LS7 4BH	Jewish	II	1929	1985	Byzantine style designed by J Stanley Wright of Albion Street, once the most popular synagogue in Leeds. Now occupied by the Northern School of Contemporary Dance. On closure some of the fittings were removed to the new synagogue in Shadwell Lane, Leeds 17.
Ramgarhia Board Gurdwara		138 Chapeltown Road; LS7 4EE	Sikh		1980	1987	Built in 1966 as a social centre for the Ramgarhia community, it was registered as a place of worship in 1980. In 1987 transferred to larger premises at 8/10 Chapeltown Road. Now used as a children's nursery.
Union Chapel		218a, Chapeltown Road, LS7	Various	II	1887	1999	Originally joint usage by Baptists and Congregationalists. Later let as synagogue then a Hindu temple. From 1960 to 1999 a Sikh temple. Interior destroyed by fire in 2003.

=== City Centre ===
Name	Image	Location	Denomination	Grade	Opened	Closure	Notes
Bridge Street Church		Bridge Street LS2	Pentecostal		1931	2016	In 1931 this building replaced earlier churches around the city dating from 1910, and was itself replaced by the Bridge Community Church in Burmantofts in 2016.
Lady Lane Chapel		Lady Lane LS2	Methodist	II	1840		Wesleyan Methodist Association chapel, known as Templar House, designed by James Simpson, later a warehouse, later offices, listed in 1975, currently not in use. As a chapel it reportedly "had space enough for 1,700 worshippers, along with provision for 400 children in a classroom beneath the building". Signage refers to "British Road Services".
Oxford Place Methodist Church		Oxford Place; LS1 3AU	Methodist	II	1903	8 October 2017	1903 Chapel, became a church in 1980 with some rebuilding. The Leeds Mission Circuit (Leeds Methodist Mission) became part of the Leeds South and West Methodist Circuit in September 2015. The premises were shared with Oxford Place Centre, which as of January 2020 is being redeveloped as an ethical 70-room hotel with a restaurant and meeting rooms. In May 2017, "the Church Council realised that attempting to maintain a worshipping community over the period of the re-development would be very difficult. The Council, therefore, decided that the church should close. On Sunday, 8th October 2017, the Church held its final services, celebrating 182 years of witness and worship in the centre of Leeds." A prayer room called the Brunswick Prayer Chapel was retained for a while until the building closed. The work of Leeds Methodist Mission is continued through Leeds Sanctuary, which operates "a number of networks based in Leeds City Centre", with an office base at 43 The Calls, Leeds LS2 7EY.
Salem Chapel		Hunslet Lane; LS10 1JW	United Reformed Church		1791	2001	The Salem Chapel opened in 1791, while the bow front was added in 1906. Leeds United Football Club was founded there in 1919. The chapel closed in 2001 and is now used as an office and conference facility.
Seamen's Chapel		10-12 Dock Street			Before 1831		The building dates from the mid- to late-18th century and was possibly a warehouse initially, then a sailors' chapel and was later as offices. There was a "Sailors' Chapel" at the premises, shown on an 1831 map, "which was possibly only a part of the building".
St John the Evangelist Church		New Briggate LS2 8JD	Church of England	I	1634	1975	The architectural historian Nikolaus Pevsner refers to St. John's as "the only church at Leeds of more than local interest". It was designated redundant on 1 November 1975.

=== Cross Gates ===
Name	Image	Location	Denomination	Grade	Opened	Closure	Notes
Stanks Methodist Church		Barwick Road LS15 8SQ	Methodist, formerly Primitive Methodist		1869	2006	Now a residential property.

=== East Keswick ===
Name	Image	Location	Denomination	Grade	Opened	Closure	Notes
Hillside Cottage		Whitegate; LS17 9HB	Methodist		1847	~1900	Built as a Primitive Methodist Chapel, becoming a private house around 1900.
Old Mill		School Lane; LS17 9DA	Methodist		1729	1891	Replaced by the present chapel on Main Street, then converted into a flour mill: now a house.

=== Farsley ===
Name	Image	Location	Denomination	Grade	Opened	Closure	Notes
Congregational Chapel		Bradford Road LS28 6DA	Baptist	II	1852		By Lockwood and Mawson. Gothic Revival, Early English lancet style in sandstone, and green-slate
Farsley Baptist Church		71 Bryan Street; LS28 5JP	Baptist		1905	2004	Viewed from Priesthorpe Road showing the Sunday School extension to the original church. Now a residential property. The congregation now worships in Farsley Community Church.

=== Garforth ===
Name	Image	Location	Denomination	Grade	Opened	Closure	Notes
Dayspring Church		62C Main Street, LS25 1AA	Evangelical				Was open in 2008, but as of 2016 the premises are a beauty salon. The congregation now meets at Garforth library.
Primitive Methodist Chapel		5 Chapel Lane, LS25 1AG	Primitive Methodist		1877	1932	Earlier chapel on this site from 1821. Amalgamated with Brunswick Chapel on Church Lane 1932 and building went to commercial use. Now a college.

=== Gipton ===
Name	Image	Location	Denomination	Grade	Opened	Closure	Notes
Gipton Methodist Church		Oak Tree Place; LS9 6SX	Methodist and Pentecostal		1936	2022	Formerly a manse, the church was part of the Leeds North and East Methodist Circuit, formerly Leeds East Circuit, and the building remains under the control of the circuit. It also hosted the Leeds Malayalam Christian Church. The church is closed; its final service took place on 27 March 2022.

=== Harehills ===
Nam	Image	Location	Denomination	Grade	Opened	Closure	Notes
Ashley Road Methodist Church		Ashley Road; LS8 5DB	Methodist		1964		This building is located at the junction of Ashley Road and Ashley Mount. The earlier Ashley Road United Methodist Church was located next door, near the junction with Darfield Crescent.
Harehills Road Congregational Church		53 Harehills Road at junction with Harehills Place; LS8 5LJ	Congregational		1901	1985	Originally Congregational, later United Reformed Church. Converted after closure into a community centre known as "The Harehills Place", now a carpet showroom. West Yorkshire Archive Service holds church documents dating from 1892 to 1980.

=== Harewood ===
Name	Image	Location	Denomination	Grade	Opened	Closure	Notes
All Saints Church		Grounds of Harewood House	Church of England	1	c. 1410	1977	Taken into the care of the Churches Conservation Trust on 24 October 1978
Harewood Castle Chapel		Grounds of Harewood House					The chapel is located at third-floor level above the castle's portcullis chamber and was entered from the solar room above the Great Hall.
Harewood Chapel		90 The Avenue, LS17 9LD	Church of England and Methodist	II			Before its closure, the chapel was supported jointly by the Church of England and the Methodist Church. Services on the first and fourth Sundays were led by the Vicar of Collingham or a lay reader. Services on the second, third and any fifth Sunday were led by the Methodist Minister or a local preacher. It was formerly part of the Leeds North and East Methodist Circuit.

=== Headingley ===
Name	Image	Location	Denomination	Grade	Opened	Closure	Notes
First Church of Christ Scientist Leeds		Alma Road	Church of Christ, Scientist				The church is now used as offices. It had been proposed to demolish it to make way for Leeds' aborted New Generation Transport project.
First Church of Christ Scientist (Headingley Lane)		Headingley Lane, LS6 1BL	Church of Christ, Scientist		1934		Originally designed for the First Church of Christ Scientist by local architect William Peel Schofield (1894–1926). The building passed into the ownership of the Leeds Girls High School in 1986 and was then known as the Elinor Lupton Centre. The church auditorium was used as a theatre and concert hall. Now a public house, The Golden Beam, owned by JD Weatherspoon. An earlier building (1913) functioned as a school but the school assembly room also served as a church.
Headingley Hill Congregational Church		Headingley Lane, junction with Cumberland Road; LS6 2EB	Congregational church, later United Reformed Church, later the City Church.	II	1864		Built by Cuthbert Brodrick. Used as offices between 1978 and 1996.
Moorfield House		11, Alma Road; LS6 2PG		II			Built in 1855/56 as a house for William Glover Joy, owner of a Leeds chemical firm. In 1936 the building became Moorfield House Missionary College. There is a Gothic Revival vaulted octagonal chapel within the building, which is now used as architects' offices.

=== Holbeck ===
Name	Image	Location	Denomination	Grade	Opened	Closure	Notes
St Matthew's Church		Stocks Hill	Church of England	II	1830s		The building is now St. Matthew's Community Centre. The multi-site Mosaic Church uses the building for a monthly meeting. Much of the housing around it including the high rise flats (with the exception of one block) have been demolished.
Wesleyan Chapel		Czar Street; LS11 9PR	Wesleyan		Around 1850		The former Wesleyan chapel building became Old Chapel Rehearsal Studios in 1992. The studios are operated by a community interest company and part of Leeds Music Trust. The original red brick chapel was built around 1850 and is not a listed building.

=== Horsforth ===
Name	Image	Location	Denomination	Grade	Opened	Closure	Notes
Providence Chapel		Broadgate Lane, Horsforth					Now converted into apartments

=== Kirkstall ===
Name	Image	Location	Denomination	Grade	Opened	Closure	Notes
Kirkstall Abbey		Kirkstall Road / north bank of the River Aire; LS5 3EH	Roman Catholic	I	c. 1152	1538	
Kirkstall Methodist Chapel		Victoria Road, LS5 3BE	Methodist, formerly Primitive Methodist		1874		Now flats
Zion Methodist Chapel		Victoria Road, LS5 3JP	United Free Methodist, later Roman Catholic use.		1867 (rebuilt 1914)		Now offices

=== Meanwood ===
Name	Image	Location	Denomination	Grade	Opened	Closure	Notes
St Oswald's Church		Highbury Mount, Highbury; LS6 4JL	Church of England		1890	2002	Built in 1890 as a mission church sponsored by St. Chad's, Far Headingley to provide the people living in the Highbury/Meanwood part of St. Chad's parish with a place of worship nearer to their homes. Closed 2002, now in residential use.
Woodside Chapel		Church Lane; LS6 4LQ	Wesleyan Methodist		1811	1881	Built in 1811, replaced by the grander building on Green Lane. From 1883 to 1973 it was Meanwood Laundry, then Acorn Glass Merchants, now in residential use.

=== Middleton ===
Name	Image	Location	Denomination	Grade	Opened	Closure	Notes
Top of the Town Cottages		228 Town Street, LS10 3SH	Methodist	II	mid 18th century	c 1860	228 Town Street is one of a row of mid-eighteenth century cottages, and is "reputed to have been used as a Methodist meeting house until c1860".
Middleton Methodist Chapel		Hopewell View; LS10 3TE	Methodist		1896	2014	Replaced an 1860 chapel and Sunday School on the same site. Now converted for residential use.

=== Moortown ===
Name	Image	Location	Denomination	Grade	Opened	Closure	Notes
Leeds New Central Vilna Synagogue		7A Stainburn Parade; LS17 6AN	Jewish		1991	1994	Synagogue building at 245 Harrogate Road (now demolished) was sold and the congregation moved to rooms above a shop close by, before incorporating with the Etz Chaim Synagogue at 411 Harrogate Road. Rooms are now business premises.
Moortown Methodist Chapel		8 Shadwell Lane; LS17 6DR	Methodist	II	1850, rebuilt 1876	1932	Later used as a synagogue, then converted for business use, and has had several tenants. Currently a nursery.

=== Morley ===
Name	Image	Location	Denomination	Grade	Opened	Closure	Notes
Back Green Methodist Chapel and Sunday School		Back Green; Churwell	Methodist				Upper storey removed some time after July 1968, and property later sold.
Bruntcliffe Primitive Methodist Chapel		Howden Clough Road (formerly Elland Road); Bruntcliffe	Primitive Methodist		1896		The chapel was erected in 1895 and opened in 1896. Closed in the 1970s, now residential. The house next door to the chapel building is thought to have been used as the Chapel Keeper's dwelling.
St Brigid's		Elland Road, Churwell; LS27 7QR	Roman Catholic			2010	Now a children's nursery

=== New Farnley ===
Name	Image	Location	Denomination	Grade	Opened	Closure	Notes
Lancasterian School Room		Upper Moor Side or Moor Top, New Farnley	Church of England			9 April 2016	Founded as a school by Joseph Lancaster, a Quaker, in 1813. Monthly Church of England services were held there until April 2016.

=== Otley ===
Name	Image	Location	Denomination	Grade	Opened	Closure	Notes
Bethel Church Hall		Myers Croft	Evangelical			2021	Home to Bethel Evangelical Church (now Beech Hill church) prior to their move, and before that it was home to a Brethren assembly and known as Bethany Chapel.
Craven Street Primitive Methodist Mission		Craven Street	Primitive Methodist		1901?	Early 1950s	Thought to have been built in 1901. Now a scout troop HQ with an adjoining community centre.
Kingdom Hall of Jehovah's Witnesses		Cross Green; LS21 1HD	Jehovah's Witnesses			2022?	The property has been sold
Salvation Army worship and community halls		New Market; LS21 3AE	Salvation Army			2019	

=== Pudsey ===
Name	Image	Location	Denomination	Grade	Opened	Closure	Notes
Pudsey Unitarian Church		Church Lane	Unitarian		1861		Founded in 1854, the church was built in 1861. It was converted for residential use around 2012 and is now known as "Churchfield House".
Trinity Methodist Church		Wesley Square	Methodist	II	c. 1899		Listed in 1980. Interior has a U-shaped gallery carried on cast-iron columns. Now a nightclub.

=== Rawdon ===
Name	Image	Location	Denomination	Grade	Opened	Closure	Notes
Christian Science Church		Quakers Lane; LS19 6HU	Christian Science		1949	?	Built 1912 as an Adult School: church from 1949 now a residence "Knotta Cottage".

=== Richmond Hill ===
Name	Image	Location	Denomination	Grade	Opened	Closure	Notes
Grace Faith Ministries		27-29 Cross Green Lane; LS9 8LJ	Evangelical		2016?	2017	Building is for sale
Mount St. Mary Church		Ellerby Road	Roman Catholic	II*	1866	1986	Situated adjacent to Mount St Mary's School. Only basic structural repairs have been made to the building since its closure. It is in a state of relative dilapidation.

=== Rodley ===
Name	Image	Location	Denomination	Grade	Opened	Closure	Notes
Ebenezer Chapel		7 Rodley Lane; LS13 1LB					
United Free Methodist Church		Rodley Lane; LS13 1LB	United Methodist Free Church				At the junction of Rodley Lane and Chapel Street

=== Roundhay ===
Name	Image	Location	Denomination	Grade	Opened	Closure	Notes
St John's Church		Wetherby Road	Church of England until 2008	II	1826	2008	The church opened in 1826 off Wetherby Road. The area is generally considered Oakwood these days but in 1826 was considered part of the village of Roundhay. The church is situated behind the almshouses; both were built at the expense of S. Nicholson. The church was closed by the Church of England in 2008, who then sold it to an evangelical denomination for a nominal £1, although they have never opened it. The church and churchyard are now in a state of dilapidation. An organisation called "the Friends of Roundhay St. John's Church" was founded in 2014 to work for the restoration and conservation of the church and two adjacent graveyards.

=== Seacroft ===
Name	Image	Location	Denomination	Grade	Opened	Closure	Notes
Seacroft Methodist Church		York Road, LS14 6JB	Methodist		1874	2000	Since 2014 Chapel FM, an arts venue.

=== Shadwell ===
Name	Image	Location	Denomination	Grade	Opened	Closure	Notes
Methodist Chapel		99 Main Street LS17 8HL	Methodist	II	1814	1892	Worship transferred to the church in 1892. Was Shadwell public library, but closed 2012 and re-opened as community-run Shadwell Independent Library, Arts Centre and Cafe.

=== Sheepscar ===
Name	Image	Location	Denomination	Grade	Opened	Closure	Notes
Divine Exchange Christian Centre		Unit 3, 19 Sheepscar Street; LS7 1AD	Non-denominational			2018	Now located at 27 Sheepscar Street South
Salvation Army Church		175 Meanwood Road; LS7 1JW	Salvation Army		1912		Now a charity shop.
Woodhouse Carr Chapel		232 Meanwood Road; LS7 2AH	Wesleyan Methodist		1873	1950s	Architect G. F. Danby. Now business premises.

=== Stanningley ===
Name	Image	Location	Denomination	Grade	Opened	Closure	Notes
Stanningley Methodist Church, later Church of the Holy Spirit		Leeds and Bradford Road	Methodist, later Roman Catholic			2010	There was originally a Primitive Methodist chapel in Richardshaw Lane. The Catholic parish registers are now held at Christ the King Church, Bramley.
Olivet Chapel		50 Bradford Road; LS28 6DD	Methodist and United Reformed	II	1856	1982	Ashlar facade, hammer-dressed stone to sides and rear, Welsh blue-slate roof.

=== Swarcliffe ===
Name	Image	Location	Denomination	Grade	Opened	Closure	Notes
St Luke's Church		Stanks Lane North, Swarcliffe	Church of England		1963	2012	Designed by M. J. Farmer to serve the council estate. Stone faced with slate roof.

=== Temple Newsam ===
Name	Image	Location	Denomination	Grade	Opened	Closure	Notes
Temple Newsam House Chapel		Colton Road; LS15 0AE	Church of England	1	1877	1974	The Palladian library of 1738–45, built in the end of the Jacobean Long Gallery, was converted into a chapel in 1877 by G F Bodley, and reconverted in 1974.

=== Thorner ===
Name	Image	Location	Denomination	Grade	Opened	Closure	Notes
Bishop's House (Eltofts)		Carr Lane; LS14 3HF	Roman Catholic	II			Originally the dower house of the Earls of Mexborough, occupied later by the Roman Catholic Bishop of Leeds. The Bishop's private chapel was on the ground floor; lintels to the ground-floor windows were broken through to form long lights to provide lighting for the chapel.
Thorner Methodist Church (1878–1985)		Carr Lane	Methodist	II	1878	1985	Built 1876–78 by C. E. Danby (Leeds), and now converted into flats. There was previously a Methodist chapel in Main Street, Thorner, founded in 1754.
Thorner Methodist Church (1985–2020)		Main Street; LS14 3BU	Methodist	II	1985	2020	Part of the Leeds North and East Methodist Circuit. First founded 1754, present building built 1878, occupied by church 1985, closed 2020.

=== Thorpe on the Hill ===
Name	Image	Location	Denomination	Grade	Opened	Closure	Notes
Thorpe on the Hill Wesleyan Methodist Church		OS Grid; Ref. SE3121826246	Wesleyan Methodist				Now a dwelling.

=== Tingley ===
Name	Image	Location	Denomination	Grade	Opened	Closure	Notes
Tingley Zion Methodist Chapel		Chapel Street	Methodist		1879	1997	Now a dwelling.

=== Weardley ===
Name	Image	Location	Denomination	Grade	Opened	Closure	Notes
The Old Chapel		Weardley Lane (OS Grid Ref. SE2966044594)					Now known as "The Old Chapel" and converted to residential use.

=== Wetherby ===
Name	Image	Location	Denomination	Grade	Opened	Closure	Notes
Calvinist Chapel, Victoria Street		Victoria Street, Wetherby	Calvinist		1817	c. 1835	The former Calvinist chapel closed along with the Methodist chapel on North Street after mergers within the Methodist church brought about the building of a new church on Bank Street. While the North Street chapel has since been demolished and is now a car park, the Victoria Street chapel survived. It is currently in use as a hairdressers.
Christian Army Meeting House		Bank Street, Wetherby	Independent		unknown	unknown	The premises are now used for commercial purposes.

=== Whinmoor ===
Name	Image	Location	Denomination	Grade	Opened	Closure	Notes
St. Margaret Clitheroe's Chapel of Ease			Catholic		1981	2006	Former chapel of ease served by St. Gregory's Church, Swarcliffe

=== Wike ===
Name	Image	Location	Denomination	Grade	Opened	Closure	Notes
Old Schoolhouse		School Lane LS17	Church of England		1726		Funded by Lady Elizabeth Hastings. It was a school Monday to Friday, a church on Sunday, and could be used for meetings until at least 1991. It has now been adapted into a 5-bedroom house.

=== Woodhouse ===
Namen	Image	Location	Denomination	Grade	Opened	Closure	Notes
Blenheim Baptist Church		Woodhouse Lane	Baptist	II	1864	2007	By Cuthbert Broderick. Coursed squared gritstone, slate roof. Gothic Revival style.
Carlton Hill Meeting House		Woodhouse Lane	Society of Friends		1868		Leeds Meeting purchased Carlton House and part of an estate in Woodhouse Lane from John Jowitt in 1864. The house was demolished, and new premises were built on the site, including the meeting room and school rooms, committee rooms and a caretaker's house. After the Society moved to new premises further north on Woodhouse Lane, the building was used as [Old] Broadcasting House, headquarters of BBC Yorkshire, and it is now part of Leeds Beckett University.
Emmanuel Church		Woodhouse Lane	Church of England	II	1880		Now the Emmanuel Centre, a building of the University of Leeds, close to the Parkinson Building.
Leeds Grammar School Chapel		Moorlands Road; LS2 9JT	Church of England	II	1868	1997	Dedicated to St Wilfred, first listed August 1976. Now part of the Leeds University Business School
New Jerusalem Church		Willow Terrace Road	The New Church (Swedenborgian)		1885		Now known as "Jerusalem Chapel", and used as a store by the University of Leeds
Trinity St David's Congregational Chapel		Woodhouse Lane; LS2 7JT	Congregationalist	II	1898		The Trinity St. David's Church was converted into a nightclub, Halo and a bar, The Quilted Llama, which opened in 2005. Both closed in May 2014. The building is currently unused but as of January 2023 there are plans for the building to become the National Poetry Centre.

=== Yeadon ===
Name	Image	Location	Denomination	Grade	Opened	Closure	Notes
Yeadon Primitive Methodist Chapel		Devonshire Place (Town Square); LS19 7PP	Primitive Methodist		1875		Also known as Yeadon Central Primitive Methodist Chapel; now used as offices.

== Demolished places of worship ==
=== Adel ===
Remains of Roman tombstones and altars have been found near Adel Mill along Roman road 72b, which ran from Ilkley to Tadcaster. An altar dedicated to Brigantia and a stone slab with an inscription surrounding a phallus are both preserved in Adel parish church.

=== Alwoodley ===
Name	Site now	Location	Denomination	Opened	Demolished	Notes
Alwoodley Crags		Off Stairfoot Lane, LS17	Ancient Celtic religion			Reputedly a site of pagan worship. A rock-carved human figure, 570 metres (1,870 ft) south of King Lane Farm, has been identified as a Celtic warrior god, Cocidius.
Alwoodley Gates Methodist Chapel		Wigton Lane; LS17 8SA	Methodist		1984	Formerly a Wesleyan chapel, which closed in the 1960s and was converted for residential use. The house was demolished in 1984. West Yorkshire Archive Service holds papers dating from 1846 to 1972.

=== Armley ===
Name	Site now	Location	Denomination	Opened	Demolished	Notes
Armley Chapel, later St Bartholomew's Church		In the grounds of the present St Bartholomew's Church	Church of England	1630	1909	Armley Chapel constructed 1630, consecrated 1674, enlarged to St Bartholomew's Church 1834
St Dunstan's District Church		Parliament Terrace	Church of England	1898	After 1964	St Bartholomew's Mission Hall from 1898, St Dunstan's District Church from 1909, closed 1957. St Bartholomew's, St Dunstan's and St Hugh's formed a single parish. Parliament Terrace no longer exists but Parliament Road and Parliament Place still form part of the housing estate off Ley Lane which now occupies the area.

=== Arthington ===
Name	Site now	Location	Denomination	Opened	Demolished	Notes
Arthington Priory		Arthington Lane	Roman Catholic	Mid-12th century		The priory was home to a community of nuns of the Cluniac Benedictine order established through a grant by Peter de Arthington. The site of the priory church is possibly now occupied by a farmhouse called The Nunnery.

- See also Creskeld Hall for information about a medieval chapel and a later rebuilt chapel at Creskeld Hall.

=== Beeston ===
There was a chapel in Beeston with an anchorite cell attached, built before 1257.

=== Belle Isle ===
Name	Site now	Location	Denomination	Opened	Demolished	Notes
Belle Isle Congregational Church		Nesfield Road, LS10 3LG	Congregational	1952	2010	Opened 4 October 1952 by the Belle Isle Fellowship of the Leeds Congregational Council. A wooden hut had been used by the congregation from 1949 to 1952. Replaced in 2010–11 by United Reformed Church in South Leeds.

=== Bramhope ===
The original Methodist chapel in Bramhope was built in 1837, near to the site of the current church, which replaced it in 1896.

=== Bramley ===
Name	Site now	Location	Denomination	Opened	Demolished	Notes
Sandford Methodist Church		Broad Lane, Sandford, Bramley LS13 2RU	Methodist		2017	Closed 2007: picture is prior to demolition.

There was a chapel in Bramley at the time of King John (1199–1216), as shown by a deed witnessed by the Clerk of Bramley, called Norris.

=== Burley ===
Name	Site now	Location	Denomination	Opened	Demolished	Notes
Catholic Mass Centre, later Sacred Heart Church		The corner of Poplar Street and Burley Road	Roman Catholic	1890		A cottage on the corner of Poplar Street and Burley Road was used as a Roman Catholic mass centre for the Burley area from 1890 onwards. Later the Jesuits took it over and built a church on the site of the cottage, which became the original Sacred Heart Church serving the Burley area.
Export Mission Church, later Christadelphian Meeting Room	Makkah Jamia Masjid Mosque	The corner of Brudenell Road and Thornville Road	Methodist	1890s	1997	Constructed by the Walmsley brothers from sections imported from the USA. From 1924 to 1988 used by Christadelphians.
St Simon's Church	The Leeds Studios	Ventnor Street	Church of England	1865		Designed by Thomas Shaw in the Decorated Style. The parish was created 1969 from Leeds St Andrews and united in 1955 with Leeds All Hallows.
Ventnor Street Methodist Chapel	The Leeds Studios	Ventnor Street corner with Kirkstall Road	Methodist	1865	1867	

=== Burmantofts ===
Name	Site now	Location	Denomination	Opened	Demolished	Notes
Mount Tabor Mission			Pentecostal			Mount Tabor Place was demolished between July 1937 and July 1939.
St Alban the Martyr's Church	Ebor Gardens Estate	County Street, between Cutler Street and Prince George Street	Church of England	1876		Designed by architects, Messrs. Walford and Pollard of Bradford, and built in a cruciform structure of brick in the Early English style.
St Patrick's Chapel		York Road	Roman Catholic	1831		Later used as part of the adjoining school on Pott Row.
St Stephen's Church		Nippet Lane	Church of England	1854	1939	The church was designed by John Dobson and consecrated on 9 November 1854. It had an octagonal turret and a spire containing 2 bells. The ecclesiastical parish of St. Stephen's had been formed in 1851 out of St. Peter's parish, and became part of the parish of St. Agnes when the church closed. The west window stained glass in St Agnes' church was originally in St Stephen's.
York Road Baptist Church	Ebor Gardens Estate	York Road, between the junctions of Halton Place and Ainsty Road	Baptist	1872	Closed 1959, demolished soon afterwards	Designed by W.H. Harris of Leeds. Demolished for housing estate. A replacement church located on Haslewood Drive closed in 1986.

=== Buslingthorpe ===
The Church of St Michael was built in 1852–1854 on Buslingthorpe Lane and demolished in the late 1950s or early 1960s. The architect was O. W. Burleigh, of Leeds. The church was located at the western (Woodhouse Carr) end of Buslingthorpe Lane.

=== Chapel Allerton ===
Name	Site now	Location	Denomination	Opened	Demolished	Notes
Capella de Alreton			Catholic			Referred to in a land grant of around 1240, possibly established by the monks of Kirkstall Abbey for the use of their lay brothers working at the grange or small farm (the present site of the Allerton Grange estate), or possibly a manorial chapel.
Chapel Allerton Methodist Church	Parade of shops	Harrogate Road; LS7 4NU	Methodist	Around 1874	After 1969	The church is shown as still standing on an Ordnance Survey map dated 1969. A cornerstone dated 1874 is now located inside the current Chapel Allerton Methodist Church.
St Matthews			Church of England			The current church replaced the earlier church which was set within the churchyard on Harrogate Road. A Roman altar was found during the demolition of a sexton’s cottage in the grounds in 1879/80.

=== Chapeltown ===
Name	Site now	Location	Denomination	Opened	Demolished	Notes
Chassidishe Synagogue		46, Spencer Place LS7	Judaism	1935	1983	Congregation moved from the Leylands to Spencer Hall, which was then demolished and a purpose-built synagogue constructed. This was in turn demolished for a mosque, now the Leeds Islamic Centre.

=== City centre ===
Name	Site now	Location	Denomination	Opened	Demolished	Notes
Albion Chapel		Albion Walk, off Albion Street	Various	1793	1889	Foundation stone of Albion Zion Chapel laid 1793, chapel opened 1794. Became an Anglican chapel in 1796 and consecrated as St. James' Chapel, 30 September 1801. Became a Scottish Presbyterian Chapel, 2 January 1802. In February 1837 it became a Congregational chapel and in July 1840 it became the New Connexion General Baptist Chapel. Rev. Jabez Tunnicliff was minister from 1842. From 1847 to 1883 it was a Swedenborgian chapel. Then for six years it served as a wool warehouse and later storage for the Leeds Mutual Supply Company, until the building burned down on 12 July 1889. A graveyard was discovered in 1973. The site is now Pinnacle, formerly West Riding House.
Call Lane Chapel	Metro Bus Stand K5 and open space	Call Lane LS1	Independent or Arian			Marked on an 1847 Ordnance Survey map with the word "Arian". It is not marked on an 1890 OS map. Baptismal records covering the years 1695-1778 are held by the National Archives.
Ebenezer Methodist New Connexion Chapel	Victoria Quarter	Harewood Street; LS2 7JA	Methodist New Connexion			Alexander Kilham preached here. The chapel burialyard was ordered closed to further burials by a motion passed at Leeds Town Council in June 1848.
Harrison's Almshouses Chapel	Bradbury Building, Age UK Leeds	Mark Lane LS2 8JA			Around 1815	The chapel of Harrison's Almshouses, built by John Harrison in the churchyard of St John the Evangelist, was converted for use as the Leeds Charity School in 1726. The Charity School rebuilt the premises in or around 1815 before moving to Regent Street in Chapel Allerton in the 1890s. A blue plaque mentions the chapel.
St Anne's former cathedral		The Headrow	Roman Catholic	1838	1904	St. Anne's church originally stood at the junction of Guildford Street (the present Headrow) and Cookridge Street. It became a cathedral in 1878 when the Diocese of Leeds was established. The site was purchased by Leeds Corporation in order to widen The Headrow.
St Paul's Church		Park Square	Church of England	1793	1906	Built to provide a place of worship for the residents of the Park Estate. Described as "a plain but neat edifice of brick, with stone quoins and dressings". The ground was given by Christopher Wilson, Bishop of Bristol, who was educated at Leeds Grammar School and laid the first stone on 20 September 1791.

Before the reformation there were also four chantry chapels in what is now Leeds city centre: the chantry chapel of St Mary the Virgin at the north east end of Leeds Bridge, opened around 1327, a chantry chapel founded in 1430 by Leeds vicar Thomas Clarell, near to the vicarage in Kirkgate, a chantry chapel dedicated to St Mary Magdalene, founded in 1470, and one located in Lady Lane.

=== Clifford ===
Name	Site now	Location	Denomination	Opened	Demolished	Notes
Wesleyan Church		Chapel Lane; LS23 6HU	Methodist	Before 1838	Before 1845	An early trade directory of 1838 identifies a Wesleyan Chapel and it is believed this was on the site of the present tower of St Edward's Church.

=== Cross Gates ===
Name	Site now	Location	Denomination	Opened	Demolished	Notes
Cross Gates Wesleyan Church		Austhorpe Road; LS15 8QR	Wesleyan	1882	1893	Opened on 6 December 1882; the building cost £836. 15. 7d and was dedicated by Marshall Randles, later President of the Methodist Conference, who also preached at the opening ceremony. Replaced by the current Methodist church on adjacent land in 1893.

=== Eccup ===
Kelly's Directory of the West Riding of Yorkshire (1881) refers to a Methodist (Wesleyan) chapel in Eccup.

=== Farsley ===
Mediaeval Wadlands Hall, Priesthorpe Road, now the location of Wadlands Farm and Wadlands Cottage, had its own private chapel and chaplain. The field "Chapel Ing" commemorates this chapel, and it is possible that the name "Priesthorpe" is so called from the priest at the hall.

=== Guiseley ===
Leeds City Council's Conservation Area Appraisal and Management Plan for Guiseley notes that "a number of fragments from a 9th century Anglo-Saxon cross were discovered reused in the north wall of St Oswald’s Church. The remains of the cross and the dedication to an early saint may be evidence of a preconquest church at Guiseley."

=== Halton ===
Name	Site now	Location	Denomination	Opened	Demolished	Notes
St John's Church		Corner of Selby Road and Field End Road, LS15 0QD	Catholic	1969		The church was a chapel of ease served by St Theresa's Church, Cross Gates, now a children's nursery.

=== Harehills ===
Name	Site now	Location	Denomination	Opened	Demolished	Notes
Ashley Road United Methodist Church		Ashley Road, Harehills, at the junction with Darfield Crescent	United Methodist Church	1906		The church was used as a furniture warehouse after the church members had moved to the new Ashley Road Methodist Church next door (now closed). The architect was H. Ascough Chapman.

=== Harewood ===
Name	Site now	Location	Denomination	Opened	Demolished	Notes
All Saints Church						Predecessor to the present-day church. The original church, founded in 1116, was completely re-built in the 15th century by the descendants of Sir William de Aldeburgh (the builder of Harewood Castle). Its founder was William de Curcy, son-in-law of Robert de Romelli, the Norman Baron to whom the manor of Harewood was given by William the Conqueror after the Battle of Hastings.

=== Holbeck ===
Name	Site now	Location	Denomination	Opened	Demolished	Notes
St Barnabas' Church		Sweet Street	Church of England	1855	Around 1938	These two churches, St John's Church and St Barnabas' Church, were demolished and replaced in 1938 by St John and St Barnabas Church in Belle Isle.
St John's Church			Church of England		Around 1938	These two churches, St John's Church and St Barnabas' Church, were demolished and replaced in 1938 by St John and St Barnabas Church in Belle Isle.

=== Horsforth ===
Name	Site now	Location	Denomination	Opened	Demolished	Notes
The Grove Methodist Chapel		New Street	Methodist	11 May 1796		The predecessor of the present Grove Methodist Church, located in New Street opposite the present church.

=== Hunslet ===
Name	Site now	Location	Denomination	Opened	Demolished	Notes
Christ Church	One Leeds City Office Park	Meadow Lane, south of the junction with Great Wilson Street	Church of England	1826	1972	Constructed between 1823 and 1826 of Bramley Fall stone. This was the first of the Million Churches built in Leeds, named after the special Government grant of £1,000,000 which was used to build over 600 churches across the country. Designed by R. D. Chantrell. The church was built in the decorated style with a square tower and pinnacles along each side. It is marked as a Perpetual Curacy ("Per. Curacy") on an Ordnance Survey map published in 1852.
St. Joseph's Church	St. Joseph's Catholic Primary School	Joseph Street; LS10 2AD	Roman Catholic	1860	2005	The church was replaced by a new church building in 1971; this closed in 1994 and was demolished in 2005. St. Joseph's parish is now part of the parish of St Margaret Clitherow.
St. Jude's Church	Leeds City College	On the corner of Leathley Road and Hunslet Road	Church of England			The final service was held in 1950, the church was deconsecrated in 1954, and in 1955 the Alf Cooke Printworks acquired the site. A window from the church was preserved in the factory building, was moved for a time to St. Mary the Virgin Church in Hunslet, and has been installed in the Leeds City College board room since October 2017. The church also maintained a mission room about 500 yards away on Cross Myrtle Street.
St. Silas' Church	Matrix House (business premises)	Goodman Street; LS10 1NZ	Church of England	1870	1955	Funded by the Leeds Church Extension Society at a cost of £5000, its architect was George Corson and the church seated 750 worshippers.
Wesleyan Methodist Chapel		Meadow Lane	Wesleyan Methodist	1815		Baptism and marriage registers, minutes, accounts, pew sittings and other papers dating from 1838 to 1934 are held by West Yorkshire Archive Service.

=== Kippax ===
Name	Site now	Location	Denomination	Opened	Demolished	Notes
Kippax Wesleyan Church		Chapel Lane, Kippax	Wesleyan Methodist Church		Late 1960s or early 1970s	Replaced by the current Methodist Church on the opposite side of Chapel Lane

=== Leylands, The ===
Name	Site now	Location	Denomination	Opened	Demolished	Notes
Back Nile Street Synagogue (Beth Hamedrash Hagodel Synagogue)		North Street and Back Nile Street (now Nile Street).	Jewish	1908		Back Nile Street had a new synagogue built in early 1908 to replace the previous one on Hope Street, which was demolished as part of the "Hope Street Improvement Programme".
Polish Synagogue		Byron Street	Jewish	1891		Located here until 1933.
St Luke's Church	Northgate House (Henton's Chartered Accountants)	On the corner of Skinner Lane and North Street.	Church of England	1841		Designed by architects William Perkin and Elisha Backhouse.
St Thomas' Church		Melbourne Street, east of St. Thomas Row	Church of England	1851		Built in 1850/1 at a cost of £7,000. It was paid for by M. J. Rhodes. The designer was W Butterfield, the exterior of the building was contrasting black and red brick, it stood on a 36-acre site.

=== Little London ===
Name	Site now	Location	Denomination	Opened	Demolished	Notes
Blenheim Baptist Church		Blackman Lane; LS2 9ER	Baptist	1864	2007	The church was demolished in 2007. The picture is of the site prior to demolition.
St Matthews		Camp Road	Church of England	13 August 1851	1980	Designed by Charles Walklett Burleigh.

=== Merrion Centre ===
Name	Site now	Location	Denomination	Opened	Demolished	Notes
First Leeds Synagogue		Back Rockingham Street	Jewish	1846	1963	A Civic Trust plaque on the side of a staircase in the Merrion Centre marks the site.
New Briggate Synagogue		Merrion Street	Jewish		1927	This was the second largest synagogue in Leeds during the early part of the 20th century. The site is now a mock Tudor building in New Briggate/Merrion Street.

=== Methley ===
Name	Site now	Location	Denomination	Opened	Demolished	Notes
Methley Primitive Methodist chapel	Housing: The Blossoms	Main St LS26 9HZ	Methodist	1866	1965+	Size 36' x 32' without pews, also used as a Sunday School.

=== Moortown ===
Name	Site now	Location	Denomination	Opened	Demolished	Notes
Allerton Grange	Allerton Grange School	Talbot Avenue; LS17 6SF	Catholic			The Killingbeck family celebrated Catholic Mass at Allerton Grange after the reformation.
New Central Vilna Synagogue	Flats	245 Harrogate Road; LS17 6PA	Ashkenazi Jews	1959	1991	Former Kingsway Cinema. The building was sold in 1991. Image:

=== Newsam Green ===
Archaeologists believe that there may have been a chapel at the Temple Newsam Preceptory, south east of Temple Newsam House, a few yards to the south-east of junction 45 of the M1 motorway. Excavations in 1903 found human remains, stone coffins and a possible chapel, but a rescue dig in 1989-1991 failed to find the chapel, which was surmised to be under an industrial spoil heap to the south. The Gatehouse Gazetteer refers to "the area immediately north of the chapel", which had been disturbed by animal burials before the 1989-1991 excavation.

=== Otley ===
Name	Site now	Location	Denomination	Opened	Demolished	Notes
Archbishops' Palace		Manor Square LS21 3HU	Roman Catholic			The Archbishops of York had an episcopal palace at Otley which was occupied from medieval times until 1606. Ruined at the time of the English Civil War. Excavations by the Otley Archaeological and Historical Society have found chapel buildings dating from three periods: a Saxon/Norman building, an early 13th century chapel of two storeys with a vaulted undercroft, and a later single-storey building.
Salem Chapel		Current site of the Bridge Church in Otley		1826	1897	
Westgate Methodist New Connexion Chapel	Westgate Car Park	Westgate; LS21 3AS	Methodist New Connexion	1867	1970	Westgate Methodist New Connexion Chapel built in 1867 and used until 1944. It was later used for various businesses including a children's clothing factory in the 1950s and demolished in 1970. The congregation, also known as 'the United Methodists', later joined the Methodist Church on Station Road in Otley.

=== Pool-in-Wharfedale ===
Name	Site now	Location	Denomination	Opened	Demolished	Notes
Seventeenth Century Church, name unknown		Current site of St Wilfrid's Church	Church of England			Leeds City Council notes that there may have been another chapel on the current site of St. Wilfrid's Church in the 17th century, or alternatively it may have been located at a site immediately to the west of Manor House and the current Church. The Pool tithe award map of 1850 indicates the field name ‘Chapel Garth’ at this location.

=== Quarry Hill ===
Name	Site now	Location	Denomination	Opened	Demolished	Notes
Old Boggart House		Site of Leeds Playhouse	Methodist Church of Great Britain	1813		The Old Boggart House was demolished following the opening of the adjacent St Peter's Chapel in 1834. The site is marked by a blue plaque originally located on the steps leading up to the Playhouse and relocated to the side of the building in 2019.
Quarry Hill Ebenezer Primitive Methodist chapel		Chapel Street	Primitive Methodist	1822		Originally called "Chapel Street Chapel", later "Quarry Hill Chapel". New frontage was added in 1846 and the chapel was enlarged in 1874. It closed in 1933.
St Mary's Church		St Mary's Street	Church of England	1825	1979	A Commissioners' Church, architect Thomas Taylor. Located on the top of the hill, looking over New York Road towards the city centre, and known both as "St. Mary's Mabgate" and "St. Mary's Quarry Hill". The site is now a Diocesan Office. The Sunday school remains, as does the burial ground, a green area sloping down to Mabgate.

=== Richmond Hill ===
Name	Site now	Location	Denomination	Opened	Demolished	Notes
East Street United Methodist Free Church		East Street/Timber Place/Atlas Street, near Cross Green Lane.	United Methodist Free Church			West Yorkshire Archive Service holds records covering 1860 to 1926. The church included a school.
Temple View Road Primitive Methodist Church		Temple View Road, at junction with former Berking Street.	Primitive Methodist until Methodist Union in 1932			West Yorkshire Archive Service holds records covering baptisms 1886–1937.

=== Roundhay ===
Name	Site now	Location	Denomination	Opened	Demolished	Notes
Roundhay Methodist Chapel		North Lane (then called Chapel Lane)	Methodist	c. 1815	Before 1874	The first chapel was replaced by a larger one on the same road. Stones from this were incorporated into the Church.
Roundhay Methodist Church	The Manor, retirement housing	Ladywood Road; LS8 2QF	Methodist	1874	1985	Early English style with seating for 250, often known as "The Ladywood", part of the former Brunswick Circuit.

The first post-Reformation Catholic church in Leeds was the Roundhay Mission.

=== Rothwell ===
Name	Site now	Location	Denomination	Opened	Demolished	Notes
Rothwell Primitive Methodist Chapel	Leeds City College	Marsh Street; LS26 0AE	Primitive Methodist			There were two Primitive Methodist chapels in Rothwell. The site in Marsh Street was formerly Joseph Priestley College and is now Leeds City College's Rothwell Centre.
St. George's Hospital Chapel	Private housing	Wood Lane; LS26 0RW				The chapel closed in 1990 or 1991 with the rest of the hospital site and was subsequently demolished for the construction of a housing estate.

=== Scarcroft ===
A Roman altar has been identified near Milner Beck in Scarcroft.

=== Seacroft ===
Name	Site now	Location	Denomination	Opened	Demolished	Notes
Our Lady of Perpetual Succour		Foundry Mill Crescent / Foundry Mill Lane	Catholic			

=== Shadwell ===
Name	Site now	Location	Denomination	Opened	Demolished	Notes
Chapel of Ease		25 Gateland Lane; LS17 8HS		1438 or earlier		Slowly dismantled from about 1764 to provide stone for nearby buildings. Foundations discovered 1964 during construction of a bungalow.

=== Sheepscar ===
Name	Site now	Location	Denomination	Opened	Demolished	Notes
Holy Rosary Church		Barrack Street	Catholic	1886		Now on Chapeltown Road
Roscoe Methodist Church		Roscoe Mount	Methodist	1882		Now on Francis Street
St Clement's Church			Church of England			

=== Stourton ===
Name	Site now	Location	Denomination	Opened	Demolished	Notes
St. Andrew's Church		Pontefract Road			After 1973	The Leeds, Stourton and Thwaitegate War Memorial, erected by the Stourton St Andrews War Memorial Committee, originally stood at the church.

=== Swillington ===
Domesday Book states that 'a church is there', but no record of that building now remains.

=== Thorpe Park ===
Northern Archaeological Associates make reference to an altar of Iron Age or Roman origin at Grim's Ditch, part of an archaeological site investigated as part of the Thorpe Park commercial development.

=== Wetherby ===
Name	Site now	Location	Denomination	Opened	Demolished	Notes
Chapel of Ease, Wetherby		Market Place, Wetherby	Church of England			The chapel was replaced by St James' Church. Wetherby Town Hall now occupies the site.
North Street Primitive Methodist Chapel		North Street, Wetherby	Primitive Methodist	1874	1966	The church closed after mergers within the Methodist church, closing this and the Calvinist Chapel on Victoria Street (now a hairdressers). The Bank Street church effectively replaced them. The site is now a car park.

=== Woodhouse ===
Name	Site now	Location	Denomination	Opened	Demolished	Notes
Camp Road Baptist Chapel	Housing off Grosvenor Hill	Camp Road, facing onto Grosvenor Hill	Baptist	1874	After 1966	The chapel was in use as a warehouse from the 1940s until at least 1967.
Catholic Apostolic Church	Grass and trees, part of Leeds University campus	Cromer Road, opposite Lyddon Hall	Catholic Apostolic Church	1886	After 1962	Architect James W. James of London. Gothic style, red brick with stone dressings, barrel roof and interior plastered.
Church of the Holy Name	Open space	At the junction of Servia Road and Cambridge Road			After 1967	Designed by Chorley and Cannon, built in 1881 at a cost of £4000. There was seating for 450, with a schoolroom for 700 children. It fell into disuse as a church and became a furniture store for Leeds City Council's Education Department. Demolished some time after 1967.
Nether Green Chapel		At the corner of the former Royston Place and Coldcall Terrace, Nether Green	Congregational Church.			A small (30 seat) mission church supported by Headingley Congregational Church. Registers, minutes and papers are held by West Yorkshire Archive Service.
St. Vincent's Chapel		Coldcall Terrace, Nether Green	Roman Catholic			Roman Catholic chapel-of-ease.
Woodhouse Methodist Church	Onestop Woodhouse community convenience store	Woodhouse Street; LS6 2NY, on the corner of Wesley Court	Methodist			The first Wesleyan Chapel on this site was built in 1770. The last church was a single-storey purpose-built building.

=== Wortley ===
Name	Site now	Location	Denomination	Opened	Demolished	Notes
St. Mary of Bethany Church		Tong Road	Church of England	1886	1975	The church spire was 135 feet high. Closed on 6 November 1972 due to population changes, and demolished in 1975.

An Ordnance Survey map of 1852 shows a Scotch Baptist Church to have been located on Oldfield Lane / Wellington Road, at a site which is now occupied by the Armley Gyratory.

=== Yeadon ===
Name	Site now	Location	Denomination	Opened	Demolished	Notes
Queen Street Chapel	Hanover House apartments	Queen Street	Methodist	1865	1971	Originally called United Methodist Chapel, then Queen Street Methodist Chapel and (from 1955) St Mark's Methodist Chapel.

== Major sources ==
The following sources provide much of the detail used here:

- Minnis, John, (2007) Religion and Place in Leeds English Heritage (Architecture and dates)
- British Listed Buildings (Grades)
- Mosques in Leeds (Mosques, current and past)
- GENUKI The Ancient Parish of Leeds (Historical information on churches)
- Leodis - a photographic archive of Leeds (Leeds Library and Information Service)

== See also ==
- Architecture of Leeds
- List of churches in the Anglican Diocese of Leeds
- List of places of worship in the City of Wakefield
