= St Agnes' Church, Burmantofts =

Historic church in Leeds, West Yorkshire, England

St Agnes' Church
- Church of Saint Agnes
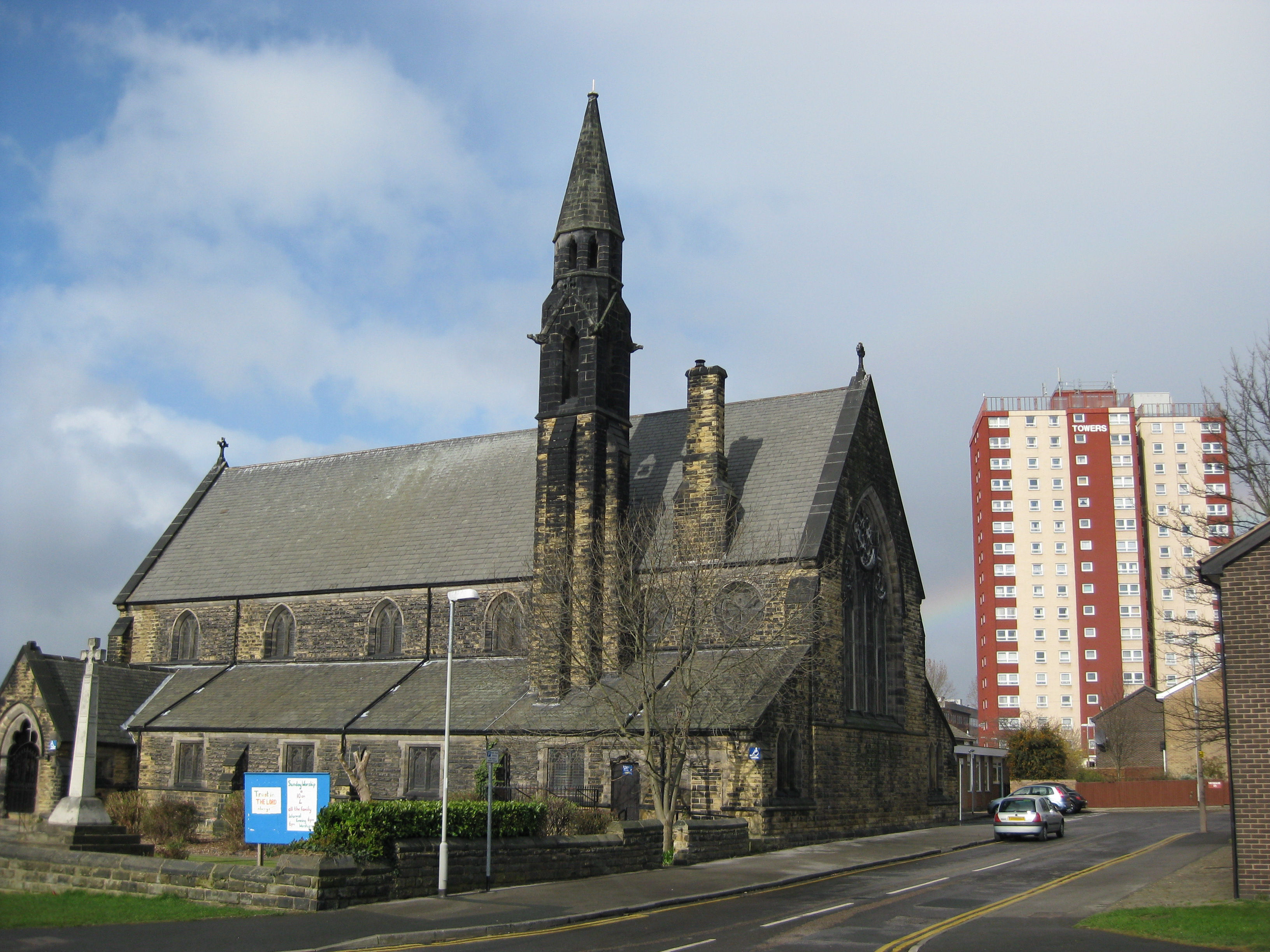
- St Agnes' Church
- 53°48′17.8″N 1°31′02.7″W
- OS grid reference: SE 31872 34397
- Location: Burmantofts, Leeds
- Country: England
- Denomination: Church of England

History
- Status: Parish Church

Architecture
- Heritage designation: Grade II listed building
- Style: Gothic Revival
- Groundbreaking: 1886
- Completed: 1887

Specifications
- Materials: coursed stone with ashlar dressings

Administration
- Province: York
- Diocese: Leeds
- Archdeaconry: Leeds
- Parish: Burmantofts

St Agnes' Church in Burmantofts, Leeds, West Yorkshire, England is an active Anglican parish church in the archdeaconry of Leeds and the Diocese of Leeds.

== History ==
The church was built to designs by architects Kelly and Birchall of Leeds between 1886 and 1887, with later alterations by Lord Grimthorpe.

== Architectural style ==
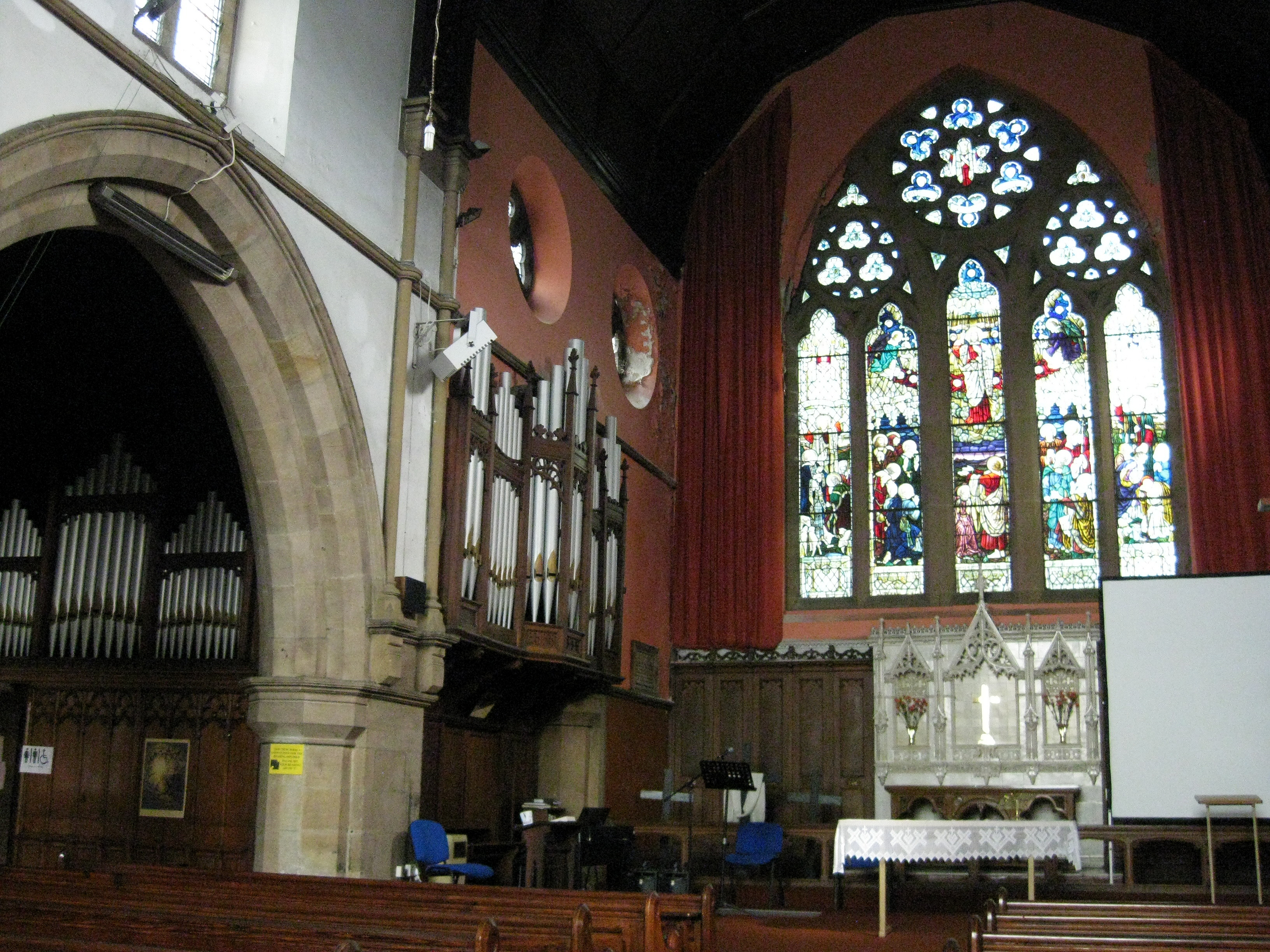
Interior

The church is of a Gothic Revival style, built of coursed stone with ashlar dressings. It has a steeply pitched slate roof with gable ends, and the four-bay nave has octagonal piers. The reredos was made in 1891 of Burmantofts faience and coloured tiles. There is a terracotta memorial below the west window which commemorates James Holroyd (1839–1890), the founder of the Burmantofts Faience Works, erected 'by his employees'.

== See also ==
- List of places of worship in the City of Leeds
