= Healing Rooms =

Healing Rooms, officially registered as Healing Rooms Ministries and the Association of Healing Rooms (IAHR) is a nonprofit organization headquartered in Spokane, Washington, United States. While John G. Lake also started a ministry with the same name and in the same city in 1915, the current organization was founded (also phrased in printed materials as "rebirthed" or "reopened") on July 22 of 1999 by Cal Pierce, who was previously involved with Bethel Church in Redding, California.

== Standards ==
All Healing Rooms locations within the organization agree on a statement of faith and adhere to certain safety, privacy and discretion protocols for ministering to individuals through prayer, such as an absolute minimum of two and a preferred maximum of three individuals ministering to a visitor in order to maintain a balance between privacy and accountability. Certain elements are predictable, such as a waiting room with a receptionist and a separate room for ministry. If a location has additional space, they may have multiple rooms dedicated to ministry in order to service a larger number of visitors during a limited span of time. The hours of a Healing Room vary, but it is most common for a location to be open one or more days per week, with a two or more hour block of time, according to people involved in the ministry.

== Organizational structure ==
The International Association of Healing Rooms uses a mapping structure of Divisions, Nations, Regions, States or Provinces, Areas (within large states), and then individual Locations. The levels of Regions and Areas are optional, and are more common within the United States of America. Each office has at least one Director, with the possibility of having two Co-Directors, and optionally an additional person serving as an Associate Director. Training for prospective local Directors is usually coordinated by a Director overseeing that zone, such as a Regional Director or National Director. According to organizational policy, a dispute involving an individual Location or another office within the hierarchy can be addressed by contacting its supervisory office.

== Divisional distribution ==
A total of 891 locations are listed on the official website, with each Healing Room having their own, unique web page. Other locations, primarily within the South Asia division, are unlisted for safety.

- North America: 419
- Central America: 17
- South America: 10
- United Kingdom: 103
- Europe (Northeast): 72
- Europe (Southwest): 65
- Africa: 43
- Asia Pacific: 134
- South Asia: 28 (not counting the confidential, unlisted rooms)

== General and cited references ==
- Official website
