= Edmund Sykes =

English Roman Catholic priest and martyr

Blessed Edmund Sykes
- Born: Leeds
- Died: 23 March 1587; York
- Venerated in: Roman Catholic Church
- Beatified: 1987

Edmund Sykes (born at Leeds; executed at York Tyburn, 23 March 1587) was an English Roman Catholic priest. He is a Catholic martyr, beatified in 1987.

== Life ==
He was a student at the English college at Reims, where he was ordained 21 February 1581. He was sent to the English Mission on 5 June following.

Sykes worked in Yorkshire, travelling around as a pilgrim for about three years when his health broke down. He worked primarily around Leeds, and it was there Arthur Webster, an apostate Catholic, took advantage of his illness to betray him. Sykes was committed to the York Kidcot by the Council of the North. He consented once to be present at a Protestant service; but he refused to repeat the act and remained a prisoner. After confinement for about six months, he was again brought before the council and sentenced to banishment. On 23 August 1585, he was transferred to Hull Castle, and within a week shipped beyond the seas.

He made his way to Rome, where he was entertained at the English College, for nine days from 15 April 1586. He wanted to atone for his lapse by the pilgrimage, and he also entertained some thoughts of entering a religious order. He decided that it was God's will that he should return to the English mission, and reaching Reims on 10 June, he left again for England on 16 June.

After about six months he was betrayed by his brother, to whose house in Wath he had resorted, and was sent a close prisoner to York Castle by the council. He was arraigned at the Lent Assizes, condemned as a traitor on the score of his priesthood, and on 23 March 1587 was drawn on the hurdle from the castle yard to York Tyburn, where he suffered the death penalty.

Bl. Edmund Sykes Parish, Leeds is named for him.

== See also ==
- Catholic Church in the United Kingdom
- Douai Martyrs
