= St Luke's Church, Clifford, West Yorkshire =

Coordinates: 53.8916°N 1.3533°W

St Luke's Parish Church
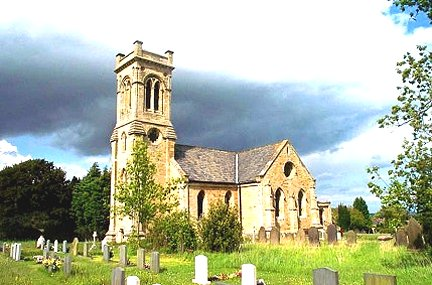
- Parish Church of St Luke
- St Luke's Parish Church
- OS grid reference: SE 42595 44126
- Location: Bramham Road, Clifford, Leeds, West Yorkshire
- Country: England
- Denomination: Church of England
- Churchmanship: Liberal Anglo-Catholic

History
- Dedication: St. Luke

Administration
- Province: York
- Diocese: York
- Archdeaconry: York
- Deanery: New Ainsty
- Parish: Clifford

St Luke's is an Anglican church in Clifford, West Yorkshire, England, part of the New Ainsty Deanery. It is one of three churches in Clifford; the second largest after St. Edward King and Confessor.

== History ==
Of the three churches in Clifford, St Luke's is the oldest, having been completed in 1842. The church was designed by John Bownas and William Atkinson and part financed by the Lane-Fox family of Bramham Park who also donated the land. The first stone was laid on St Luke's Day, 18 October 1840 and the church opened in June 1842 having cost £1500 to build. The church was Grade II listed in 1988.

== Architecture ==
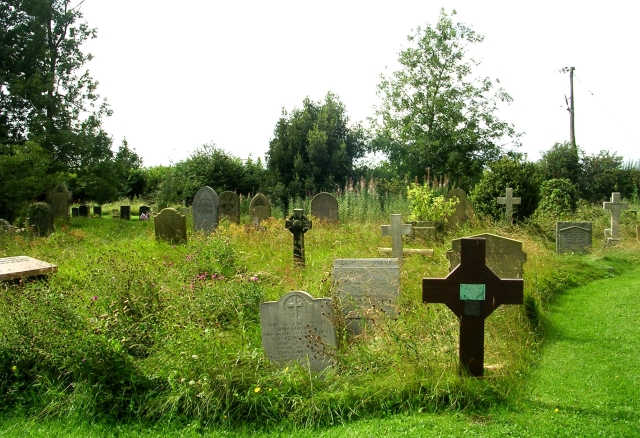
St. Luke's churchyard

The church is of a cruciform plan and of a Gothic Revival nature. Built of Magnesian Limestone, it has a pitched slate roof. The tower is at the west end and is of two stages. There were originally four pinnacles atop it, but these were deemed unsafe and removed in 1905 (a similar fate later befell the nearby St. James' Church).

== See also ==
- Listed buildings in Clifford, West Yorkshire
