= Listed buildings in Clifford, West Yorkshire =

Clifford is a civil parish in the metropolitan borough of the City of Leeds, West Yorkshire, England. The parish contains 15 listed buildings that are recorded in the National Heritage List for England. Of these, one is listed at Grade II*, the middle of the three grades, and the others are at Grade II, the lowest grade. The parish contains the village of Clifford and the surrounding countryside. The listed buildings consist of houses, two churches and associated structures, two public houses, a former school house and schoolroom, a farmhouse and a ha-ha, a well head, and a war memorial.

== Key ==
| Grade | Criteria |
|---|---|
| II* | Particularly important buildings of more than special interest |
| II | Buildings of national importance and special interest |

== Buildings ==
| Name and location | Photograph | Date | Notes | Grade |
|---|---|---|---|---|
| The Bay Horse; 53.89289°N 1.34962°W | | Late 17th century | A house, later a public house, it is in magnesian limestone, with quoins, an eaves band, and a Welsh slate roof with chamfered gable copings and shaped kneelers. Thee are two storeys, three bays, and a lower range across the rear. The doorway has a three-light fanlight and a cornice on corbels, and to the left is a canted bay window. The windows are sashes with flat heads and projecting sills. | II |
| Nunnery House; 53.89264°N 1.35184°W | | Early 18th century (probable) | The house, which was remodelled in the early 19th century, is in magnesian limestone, with quoins, and a Welsh slate roof with a coped gable and shaped kneelers on the left. There are two storeys and four bays. In the second bay is a doorway with Doric columns, a rusticated surround, a semicircular fanlight, and a pediment, and to the right is a blocked doorway with a quoined surround. The windows are sashes with architraves, most with 16 panes, wedge lintels, and projecting stone sills. | II |
| The Old Star Inn; 53.89303°N 1.34846°W | | Late 18th century | A public house in magnesian limestone, with quoins and a Welsh slate roof. There are two storeys, three bays and a lower rear wing on the right. On the front are two doorways approached by steps, with four-light fanlights, and the windows are sashes with flat heads, 16 panes, and projecting sills. | II |
| 62 High Street; 53.89311°N 1.34696°W | | Early 19th century | The house is in magnesian limestone on a plinth, with a Welsh slate roof. There are two storeys, three bays, and a wing on the left. Steps lead up to the doorway that has a rectangular fanlight, and the windows are sashes with flat heads, 16 panes, and projecting stone sills. | II |
| Outbuilding southeast of 62 High Street; 53.89303°N 1.34668°W | — | Early 19th century | The outbuilding is in magnesian limestone, and has a flat roof with an embattled parapet and moulded merlons. It consists of a rectangular two-storey turret, with a recessed projection on the left. In the ground floor is a doorway, and external steps lead up to another doorway in the upper floor. In the projection is an ogee-headed doorway. | II |
| Laburnum Cottage; 53.89319°N 1.34571°W | — | Early 19th century | A house in magnesian limestone that has a pantile roof with stone coped gables. There are two storeys, two bays, and a two-storey rear outshut. The doorway has a rectangular fanlight, and the windows are sashes with flat heads, 16 panes, and projecting stone sills. | II |
| Clifford Moor Farmhouse; 53.89548°N 1.36762°W | — | c. 1830 | The farmhouse is in magnesian limestone on a plinth, with a hipped slate roof. There are two storeys and cellars, three bays, a two-storey recessed wing on the right, and a lower one-storey addition to this. In the main part and in the wing are doorways with fanlights, and the doorway in the addition has a segmental-arched lintel. The windows in the main part are sashes, and elsewhere they are casements. | II |
| Ha-ha south of Clifford Moor Farmhouse; 53.89531°N 1.36742°W | — | c. 1830 (probable) | The ha-ha is in magnesian limestone, and it consists of a retaining wall between 1 metre (3 ft 3 in) and 1.5 metres (4 ft 11 in) high, extending in a shallow curve for about 80 metres (260 ft). The wall is capped by larger stone blocks, and there are steps across the ditch. | II |
| Shamrock House and attached cottages 53.89309°N 1.35022°W | — | Early to mid 19th century | A house with an attached terrace, and a further row of cottages. They are in magnesian limestone with slate roofs, and two storeys. The house has a curved end, and together with the terrace has nine bays, and the lower cottages have a further four bays. In the ninth bay of the terrace is a basket-arched carriage entrance with a moulded impost. The doorways have flat heads, most have fanlights, and the windows are sashes with 16 panes and projecting sills. | II |
| St Luke's Church; 53.89159°N 1.35344°W | | 1840–42 | The church is in magnesian limestone with a slate roof. It has a cruciform plan, consisting of a nave, north and south transepts, a chancel with vestries in the angles, and a west tower. The tower has two stages, clasping buttresses, a west doorway, a tall west window, cusped circular windows, two-light bell openings, blind quatrefoils, a corbel table, and a plain parapet with corner dies. Most of the windows are lancets, at the east end is a stepped triple lancet, and in the transepts are circular windows. | II |
| Churchyard entrance and walls, St Luke's Church; 53.89176°N 1.35295°W | — | 1840–42 (probable) | At the entrance to the churchyard is a gateway in sandstone with a carriage and pedestrian openings, and walls in magnesian limestone. The carriage entrance is flanked by chamfered piers on plinths with pyramidal caps. Outside these are arches over the pedestrian entrances linking to lower piers, and the gates are in iron. The walls have triangular coping, on the north side the wall curves and ends at a small pier, and there is a separate wall on the east side. | II |
| Baptismal well and walls 53.89216°N 1.35174°W | | 1840s | The well house is in magnesian limestone, with a string course and a stone slate roof, hipped at the rear, with a steeply pointed coped and moulded gable on the front. There is a single storey with a rectangular plan, and it contains a doorway with a pointed arch and a quoined surround, set in a recess with a pointed arch with an impost and corbels. Over the arch is a hood mould with a carved angel and a saltire cross, and above this is a rectangular panel. Flanking the well house are walls about 15 metres (49 ft) long, with domed coping, with an iron gate in the left wall. | II |
| St Edward's Church; 53.89341°N 1.34678°W | | 1845–48 | The Roman Catholic church was built by Joseph Hansom, and the tower was added in 1859–66. The plinth is in sandstone, the rest of the church is in magnesian limestone, and it has a green slate roof. It consists of a nave and chancel with a clerestory, north and south aisles, a south porch, a Lady chapel with a north vestry and a south chapel, and a west tower. The tower has five stages, clasping buttresses, an open first stage, and a stair turret on the southwest that is square at the base, and cylindrical in the upper part with a Lombard frieze and a conical roof. At the top of the tower are corbelled eaves, and a pyramidal roof with a finial. | II* |
| Head's house and schoolroom, Northways School; 53.89224°N 1.35209°W | | 1847 | The house and schoolroom were designed by Joseph Hansom, they are in magnesian limestone, and have Welsh slate roofs with coped gables and shaped kneelers. The house has two storeys and a basement, five bays, and a finial. On the front is a sandstone gabled porch and a doorway with a chamfered surround and a pointed arch. This is flanked by canted bay windows with lead-covered hipped roofs, and in the upper floor are five gabled half-dormers. The schoolroom has one storey and five bays, the fourth bay with a gabled porch and a bellcote. In the left angle is a stair turret, and in the house and the schoolroom the windows have trefoil heads. | II |
| War memorial 53.89276°N 1.35149°W | | 1921 | The war memorial is on the village green, and is in Portland stone, on a plinth of millstone grit, on a paved podium of York stone. It consists of a rough hewn Latin cross, with a carved crucifix on the front, and on the shaft are two panels, one with a carving of the Agnus Dei. On the front of the plinth is a panel containing the names of those lost in the two World Wars. | II |
