= Thorp Arch Bridge =

Road bridge in West Yorkshire, England

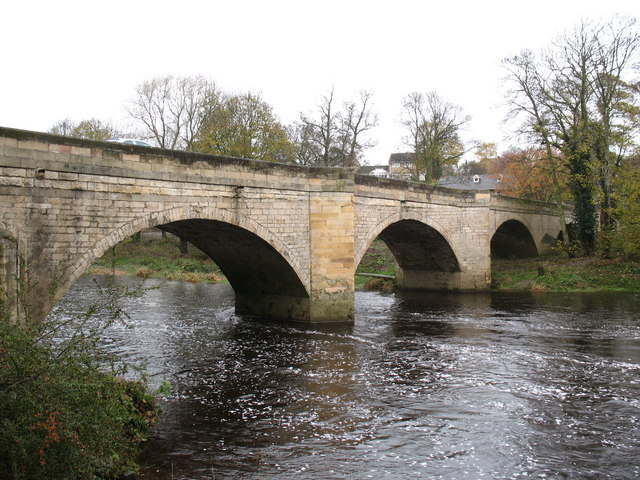
- Coordinates: 53°54′22″N 1°20′39″W
- Carries: Bridge Road, Boston Spa
- Crosses: River Wharfe
- Locale: Thorp Arch and Boston Spa, West Yorkshire
- Official name: Thorp Arch Bridge
- Other name: Boston Spa Bridge

Characteristics
- Design: Arch bridge
- Material: Ashlar Magnesian limestone
- No. of spans: 4
- Piers in water: 3

History
- Opened: 1770

Location
- Interactive map of Thorp Arch Bridge

Thorp Arch Bridge (sometimes known locally as Boston Spa Bridge) is a stone arch bridge opened in 1770 across the River Wharfe linking the West Yorkshire villages of Boston Spa on the southbank and Thorp Arch on the north.

== Description ==
Thorp Arch bridge has five arched spans built of magnesian limestone ashlar, two arches span the course of the River Wharfe. The central arch has triangular cutwaters which accommodate pedestrian refuges in the parapets, the bridge has a footpath only to its upstream side, the remaining piers have cutwaters terminating in offsets. The bridge was built to replace a ford and connect Thorpe Arch with the turnpike road which went through Boston Spa.

The bridge carries the No. 7 bus route from Harrogate to Leeds via Wetherby, which is operated by the Harrogate Bus Company.

== Cracks ==
In February 2022, the bridge was briefly closed when cracks appeared in the road surface.

== See also ==
- List of crossings of the River Wharfe
- Listed buildings in Boston Spa
- Listed buildings in Thorp Arch
