= Listed buildings in Loversall =

Loversall is a civil parish in the metropolitan borough of Doncaster, South Yorkshire, England. The parish contains five listed buildings that are recorded in the National Heritage List for England. Of these, two are listed at Grade II*, the middle of the three grades, and the others are at Grade II, the lowest grade. The parish contains the village of Loversall and the surrounding area. All the listed buildings are in the village, and consist of a church, a tomb chest and a grave slab in the churchyard, a dovecote, and a country house.

== Key ==
| Grade | Criteria |
|---|---|
| II* | Particularly important buildings of more than special interest |
| II | Buildings of national importance and special interest |

== Buildings ==
| Name and location | Photograph | Date | Notes | Grade |
|---|---|---|---|---|
| St Katherine's Church; 53.48221°N 1.13334°W | | c. 1300 | The church was altered and extended through the centuries, particularly in the 15th and 16th centuries, and in 1854–55 George Gilbert Scott carried out a restoration and rebuilt the nave and the south aisle. The church is built in magnesian limestone with roofs of lead and stone slate, and it is mainly in Perpendicular style. It consists of a nave, a south aisle, a south porch, a chancel, a separately roofed south chapel, and a west tower. The tower has four stages, diagonal buttresses, a west doorway with a pointed arch, a three-light west window, string courses, gargoyles, and an embattled parapet with eight crocketed pinnacles. | II* |
| Tomb chest 53.48208°N 1.13321°W | | Early 14th century | The tomb chest is in the churchyard of St Katherine's Church to the south of the south chapel. It is in magnesian limestone on a chamfered plinth. The sides are richly decorated with carved tracery of various kinds, and on the lid is a foliated cross. | II* |
| Grave slab 53.48204°N 1.13372°W | — | 15th century (probable) | The grave slab in the churchyard of St Katherine's Church is in magnesian limestone. It consists of a large rectangular slab with a weathered inscription at the head, and a rectangular panel containing an inscribed cross and a hatchet on a stepped base. | II |
| Dovecote; 53.48097°N 1.13527°W | — | 17th century | The dovecote in the corner of a former kitchen garden is in magnesian limestone on a plinth, with quoins, a continuous ledge below the eaves, and a stone slate roof with coped gables and shaped kneelers. It is rectangular with a single cell and two storeys, and contains a central doorway and square windows. At the rear are pyramidal and ball finials, and on the roof is an octagonal wooden lantern that has an upswept lead roof with a wrought iron finial. | II |
| Loversall Hall; 53.48104°N 1.13300°W | | 1808–11 | A country house later used as offices, it is in magnesian limestone with a sill band, a modillion eaves cornice and blocking course, and hipped Welsh slate roofs. There are two storeys, a symmetrical front range of seven bays, and a rear wing that extends to service quarters with a cross-wing and outbuildings. Steps lead up to the central doorway that has Doric half-columns and pilasters, a fanlight, a frieze, and a cornice. The windows are sashes, the window above the doorway tripartite with a cornice. In the rear wing is a Venetian stair window. | II |
