= St Mary the Virgin Church, Boston Spa =

St Mary the Virgin
- The Parish Church of St Mary the Virgin
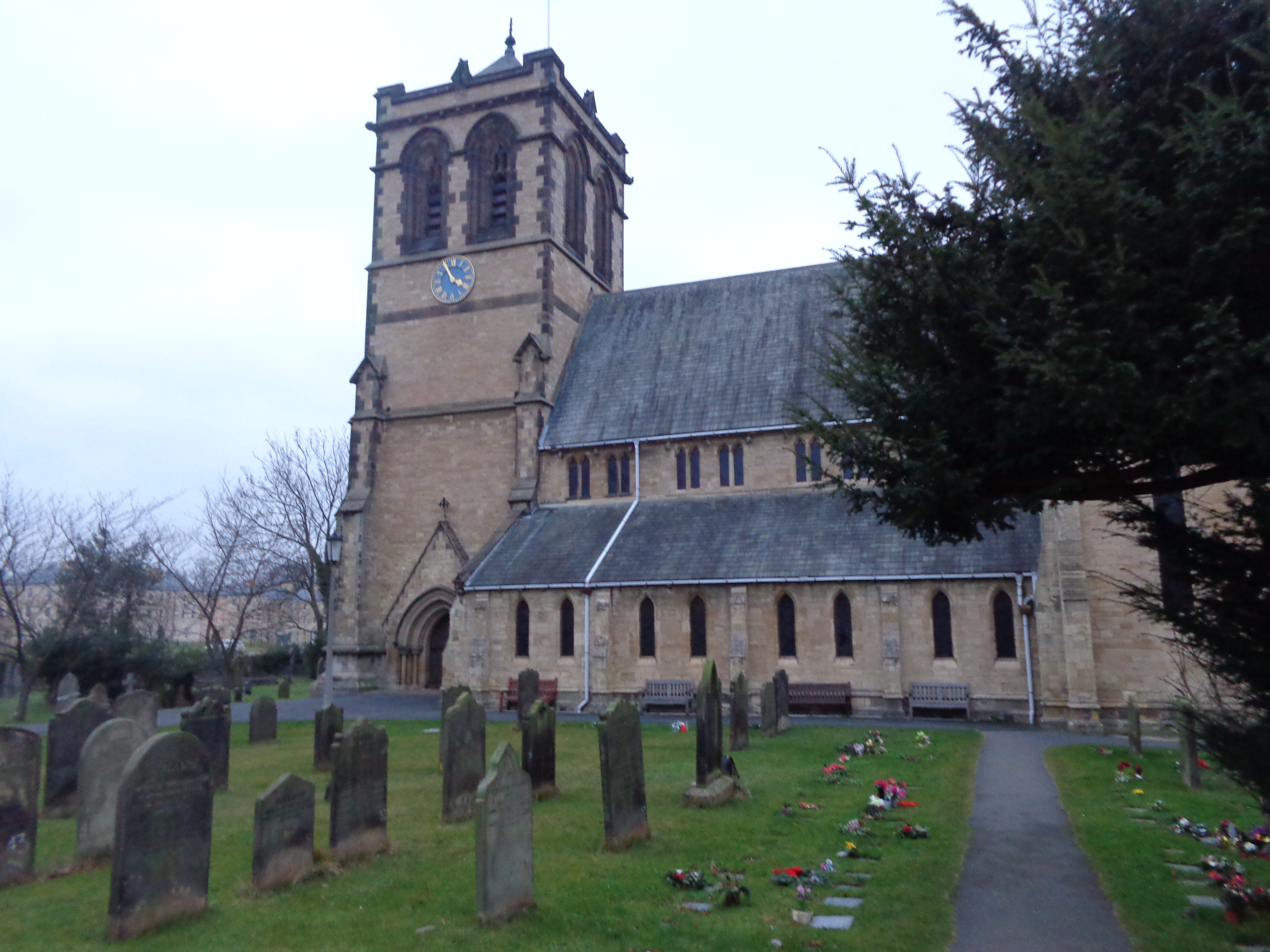
- St Mary the Virgin
- 53.9063°N 1.3493°W
- OS grid reference: SE 42848 45763
- Location: Boston Spa, West Yorkshire
- Country: England
- Denomination: Church of England

History
- Status: Parish Church
- Dedication: St Mary the Virgin

Architecture
- Heritage designation: Grade II listed building
- Architect: W. H. Parkinson
- Style: Victorian Gothic Revival

Specifications
- Capacity: 250
- Materials: Ashlar magnesian limestone with some sandstone dressinqs

Administration
- Province: York
- Diocese: York
- Archdeaconry: York
- Deanery: New Ainsty
- Parish: Parish of Lower Wharfe in the Bramham Benefice

Clergy
- Vicar(s): The Reverend Nick Morgan, MA
- Priest: The Reverend Glenda Webb

The Church of St Mary the Virgin in Boston Spa, West Yorkshire, England is an active Anglican parish church in the archdeaconry of York and the Diocese of York. It is a Grade II listed building.

== History ==
The original church on this site (designed by S. Taite) was constructed from 1812 to 1814; this was replaced by the current church, built between 1872 and 1884 by W. H. Parkinson.

== Architectural style ==
The current church was constructed over twelve years from 1872 to 1884, designed by architect W. H. Parkinson. The church has a cruciform plan with a four-bay nave and a tower to the west. The vestry is on the southern side. It is built of ashlar magnesian limestone, although some of the ornamental dressings are of sandstone. The roof is of green slate.

== See also ==
- List of places of worship in the City of Leeds
- Listed buildings in Boston Spa
