= Listed buildings in Boston Spa =

Boston Spa is a civil parish in the metropolitan borough of the City of Leeds, West Yorkshire, England. The parish contains 58 listed buildings that are recorded in the National Heritage List for England. All the listed buildings are designated at Grade II, the lowest of the three grades, which is applied to "buildings of national importance and special interest". The parish contains the village of Boston Spa and the surrounding area. The spa was discovered in 1744 and during the late 18th and early 19th century the village developed as a spa town. This resulted in the building of hotels and many substantial houses, mainly along the High Street or nearby. Most of these are built in magnesian limestone with roofs of stone slate or Welsh slate, and are in Georgian style, and many of them are listed. Also listed are the hotels and the original baths, which have been converted for domestic and other uses. The other listed buildings include structures associated with these houses, the former lodge to Wetherby Grange, a road bridge, a public house, two churches, and two mileposts.

== Buildings ==
Name and location	Photograph	Date	Notes
Dovecote; 53.90602°N 1.34500°W	—	Early to mid 18th century	The dovecote is near the south end of Thorp Arch Bridge. It is in magnesian limestone with an eaves band, and a hipped stone slate roof with a finial. There is one storey and a half-basement, and a square single-cell plan. It contains doorways, smaller openings and perching ledges, and inside are nesting holes and ledges.
Moor End Cottage; 53.90623°N 1.36482°W	—	Mid 18th century	The house, which was later extended, is in magnesian limestone with quoins, and a Welsh slate roof with chamfered gable copings and shaped kneelers. There are two storeys, three bays, and a recessed single-storey, single-bay wing on the left. The central doorway has a three-piece lintel, and the windows are horizontally-sliding sashes. In the wing is a French window.
Former Royal Hotel; 53.90477°N 1.34662°W		1753	The hotel was later extended, and in the 20th century converted into a shop. It is in painted magnesian limestone, with roofs of stone slate, Welsh slate, and cement tiles. The original block has three storeys and three bays, in about 1870 it was extended to the right with a taller block with two storeys and five bays, and there were later extensions to the left, of three storeys and three bays, and beyond of two storeys and two bays. In the centre of the original block is a blocked doorway flanked by Venetian windows, and in the right block is a round-headed doorway that has a fanlight with Gothic glazing bars, and a porch with Doric columns, triglyphs, guttae, and an open pediment. The windows are a mix of casements and sashes, some of the latter horizontally-sliding.
Thorp Arch Bridge; 53.90619°N 1.34403°W		1768–70	The bridge carries Bridge Road over the River Wharfe. It is in magnesian limestone and consists of five segmental arches. The central arch is flanked by cutwaters that rise to form refuges. The bridge has a band, a parapet with chamfered coped, which ends in round-ended piers.
110 and 112 High Street; 53.90633°N 1.35117°W	—	Late 18th century	A pair of houses in a row, they are in magnesian limestone with a Welsh slate roof. No. 110 on the right has two storeys, No. 112 has three, and each house has two bays. Both houses have doorways with fanlights and crossed glazing bars, the windows are sashes, and in No. 110 is a with doors.
200–204 High Street; 53.90396°N 1.34491°W	—	Late 18th century	Houses later used for other purposes, they are in magnesian limestone with slate roofs. No. 200, on the right, has paired gutter brackets and a hipped roof, three storeys and two bays. The doorway has a semicircular fanlight with radial glazing bars, and a cornice, and to the right is a bow window with an architrave. In the upper floors are sash windows, one blocked. Nos. 202–204 have two storeys and four bays. The doorway has a rectangular fanlight with radial glazing bars and a bracketed hood. The other ground floor bays contain bowed shop windows with cornices, and in the upper floor are sash windows.
1, 2 and 3 The Terrace; 53.90324°N 1.34093°W	—	Late 18th century (probable)	A row of three houses in magnesian limestone, two of them pebbledashed, with a Welsh slate roof. There are two storeys, and each house has three bays. All the houses have doorways with fanlights, and Nos. 1 and 3 have doorcases with a bracketed canopy. The windows are sashes.
Boston Hall and Mews Cottage; 53.90330°N 1.34328°W		Late 18th century	The buildings are in magnesian limestone with slate roofs. The hall has a main block with five bays, a lower two-bay wing on the west, both with two storeys and attics, a three-storey two-bay recessed wing on the east, and at the rear is Mews Cottage with a separate roof. The main block has a plinth, a dentilled eaves cornice, coped gables with shaped kneelers, a central Doric doorcase with an open pediment, and a doorway with a semicircular fanlight. Both wings and Mews Cottage have doorways with cornices, and the windows in all parts are sashes.
Boston Lodge; 53.90691°N 1.35792°W	—	Late 18th century	A large house, later offices, it is in magnesian limestone on a plinth, with a dentilled eaves cornice, and a stone slate roof. There are two storeys, seven bays, the outer bays recessed, and a rear three-storey wing. In the centre, steps lead up to a sandstone Doric porch with pilasters, a fluted frieze, and a dentilled cornice, and a doorway with a fanlight. Above it is a sash window in an architrave, and the flanking bays contain two-storey canted bay windows. The outer bays contain sash windows. At the rear is a brick two-storey porch with a moulded round arch, and an inscribed keystone.
Clarendon Lodge and Lismore House; 53.90671°N 1.35571°W	—	Late 18th century	A pair of houses in magnesian limestone with roofs of stone slate and Welsh slate. They have an H-shaped plan, with each house having two storeys and three bays linked by a wing. On the front facing the road is a central porch with Doric columns, a doorway that has a fanlight with radial glazing bars, and a pediment. This is flanked by canted bay windows, and over all is a cornice. In the garden front are French windows, and both houses have sash windows. The linking wing contains a doorway with a fluted surround and a bracketed cornice.
Fairseat Cottage; 53.90143°N 1.33693°W	—	Late 18th century	A small house in magnesian limestone with quoins and a stone slate roof. There are two storeys and three bays. The central doorway has an architrave and a cornice, it is flanked by canted bay windows, and in the upper floor are sash windows.
Lane Lodge; 53.90586°N 1.34998°W	—	Late 18th century	The house, which was extended in the late 19th century, is in magnesian limestone with a dentilled eaves cornice, and a roof of stone slate and Welsh slate. There are two storeys, the original part has three bays, and there is a later two-bay wing on the left projecting from an earlier wing. The central doorway in the original part has a fanlight with radial glazing bars, and a pediment on consoles, above it is a sash window, and it is flanked by two-storey bow windows. The wing has a hipped roof and sash windows.
Manna Ash; 53.90304°N 1.34209°W	—	Late 18th century	A house in magnesian limestone with a moulded eaves cornice and a Welsh slate roof. There are two storeys and a symmetrical front of three bays. Steps lead up to the central doorway that has a fanlight, pilasters and a cornice on fluted consoles, and the windows are sashes.
Oak Lodge; 53.90388°N 1.35024°W	—	Late 18th century	The house, which was later extended, is in magnesian limestone on a plinth, with a dentilled eaves cornice, and a Welsh slate roof, hipped on the left. There are two storeys, three bays, and two parallel rear ranges. The round-arched doorway has fluted jambs, a fanlight, an impost, a keystone, and an open pediment. To the right is a canted bay window, and above are sash windows. In the left bay are a blocked doorway and window. The left return contains a two-storey bow window.
Scoreby House; 53.90277°N 1.34044°W	—	Late 18th century	The house is in magnesian limestone with a sill band and a Welsh slate roof. There are two storeys and three bays. The central doorway has a rectangular fanlight, to its right is a canted bay window, and further to the right is a round-headed passage doorway that has a semicircular fanlight with radial glazing bars. The other windows are sashes.
St. Kitts; 53.90511°N 1.34396°W		Late 18th century	A house in magnesian limestone with a sill band, and a hipped roof of Welsh and green slate. There are two storeys and a half-basement, a symmetrical front of seven bays, the middle three bays projecting under a pediment, and a canted projection at the rear. In the centre is a porch with an architrave and a pediment, and the windows are casements.
The Terrace; 53.90351°N 1.34056°W		c. 1790	A hotel, later converted into four houses, the building is in magnesian limestone with a stone slate roof. There are three storeys and basements, a symmetrical front of nine bays, the outer bays projecting, and a single-storey outbuilding on the right. Along the front is a balustrade ramping up to a central porch with an open pediment and a doorway with a fanlight, and in the eighth bay is a doorway with a canopy. The basement windows have round heads, and the other windows are flat-headed sashes. Each outer bay contains a tripartite window in the ground floor, and sash windows flanked by panels in the upper floors.
Brook House; 53.90170°N 1.33691°W	—	1796–1801	The house was later refronted and extended. It is in magnesian limestone with dentilled eaves, and a roof of Westmorland green slate with coped gables and shaped kneelers. There are two storeys and four bays. The right three bays are symmetrical and contain a central doorway with ribbed pilasters, a semicircular fanlight with radial glazing, and a peaked cornice. The windows are sashes, and in the left bay is a basket-arched carriage entrance.
Greystones; 53.90256°N 1.33982°W		c. 1798	The house is in magnesian limestone with a stone slate roof. There are two storeys, attics and cellars, and six bays. Steps lead up to the doorway that has a fanlight with radial glazing bars, a frieze with roundels, and a cornice on consoles, and the windows are sashes.
Outbuildings, 262 High Street; 53.90234°N 1.33980°W	—	c. 1800	The outbuildings, which include stables and a coach house, are in magnesian limestone with pantile roofs. There are two storeys, and two parts, each with three bays, the right part recessed. The left part contains two arched carriage entrances, a stable door and casement windows, with square windows above. In the right part are quoins, and the openings include an arched wagon entrance, sash windows, and doorways.
264–270 High Street; 53.90234°N 1.33930°W	—	c. 1800	A terrace of four houses in magnesian limestone, with a wooden eaves cornice and a Welsh slate roof. They have two storeys, attics and basements, and nine bays. Steps lead up to the doorways which have fanlights. The windows vary and include bow windows, some with two storeys, canted bay windows, sash windows, and a canted oriel window.
Ashley House; 53.90690°N 1.35737°W		c. 1800	A house, later offices, in magnesian limestone on a plinth, with a dentilled and modillioned eaves cornice, and a stone slate roof with coped gables and shaped kneelers. There are two storeys and three bays, flanked by single-storey single-bay wings and single-bay screen walls, and with a parallel rear range. The central doorway has a sandstone doorcase with Doric columns, a plain frieze and a pediment, and the door has a semicircular fanlight with radial glazing bars. This is flanked by tripartite windows, and in the upper floor are sash windows. Attached to the rear are a wing on the right, and a coach house and stable with an arched carriage entrance on the left.
Boston House and wing wall 53.90357°N 1.34382°W		c. 1800	The house is in magnesian limestone, on a plinth, with sill bands, a dentilled eaves cornice, and a stone slate roof. There are three storeys, five bays, a two-storey rear wing on the left, and a wing wall to the right with a single-storey extension behind. In the centre is a distyle Doric porch with a fluted frieze and a dentilled pediment, and a doorway with a fanlight. In the left bay are two inserted doorways, and the windows are sashes. The wing wall contains a blind window and doorway.
Brantwood House, Langton House and Shelley House with screen walls 53.90338°N 1.34214°W		c. 1800	A terrace of three houses in magnesian limestone, with a sill band, an eaves cornice with gutter brackets, and a Welsh slate roof with coped gables and shaped kneelers. There are three storeys and a basement, six bays, a two-bay screen wall on the left, and a one-bay screen wall on the right. In each house, steps lead up to a doorway in the left bay that has columns, an open pediment, and a semicircular fanlight with radial glazing bars. To the right is a bow window, and in the upper floors are sash windows. The left screen wall contains two semi-domed niches, and the right wall is a sash window and a ball finial.
Grove House; 53.90186°N 1.33909°W	—	c. 1800	The house is in magnesian limestone with roofs of stone slate and pantiles. There are two storeys and three bays, two extensions to the right and a wing at the rear on the left. The central doorway has a fanlight, and is flanked by two-storey bay windows. The first extension contains sash windows, and in the second extension the windows are casements.
Rosemary Cottage; 53.90302°N 1.34199°W	—	c. 1800	A house in magnesian limestone, with a moulded eaves cornice and a Welsh slate roof. There are three storeys, two bays, and a later lean-to extension on the left. In the right bay of the ground floor is a canted bay window. The other windows on the front are sashes, those in the lower two floors with wedge lintels.
Stable block west of 212 High Street; 53.90377°N 1.34417°W	—	c. 1800	The stable block, which has been converted for other uses, is in magnesian limestone with a hipped stone slate roof. There are two storeys, four bays, the middle two bays projecting under a pediment containing a blind oculus, and single-storey single-bay wings. The windows are casements, and in the right wing is a doorway with a bracketed canopy.
The Sycamores; 53.90626°N 1.35098°W	—	c. 1800	A house that was later extended, it is in magnesian limestone with a stone slate roof. There are two storeys and three bays, and an added bay to the left. The original part has a plinth, a central doorway and sash windows. In the added bay is a basket-arched carriage entrance, a doorway and two sash windows.
Jasmine House, Jasmine Cottage and outbuildings 53.90321°N 1.34270°W	—	Late 18th or early 19th century	A pair of houses in magnesian limestone with moulded iron guttering, and roofs of stone slate and Welsh slate. There are two storeys, six bays, and a parallel rear range. The doorways have semicircular fanlights with radial glazing bars, imposts and keystones. Each house has a two-storey canted bay window and sash windows. At the rear are outbuildings, one with external stone steps and two gables.
Boston Cottage; 53.90353°N 1.34360°W	—	1807	A small house in magnesian limestone, with a sill band and a hipped stone slate roof. There are two storeys and two bays. The doorway in the left bay has a four-light fanlight, and the windows are sashes with architraves.
223 High Street; 53.90314°N 1.34140°W	—	Early 19th century	A house in magnesian limestone with a Welsh slate roof, two storeys and three bays. In the centre is a flat-roofed porch and doorway with a fanlight, and the windows are sashes. On the left return is a two-storey bay window with sash windows divided by fluted mullions.
225 and 227 High Street; 53.90306°N 1.34100°W		Early 19th century	A pair of mirror-image houses, they are in magnesian limestone with a hipped Welsh slate roof. There are two storeys, and both houses have two bays. Each outer bay contains a two-storey bow window, and in the inner bay is a doorway that has a semicircular fanlight with radial glazing and a keystone. Above the doorway is a sash window.
279 High Street and screen walls 53.90120°N 1.33557°W	—	Early 19th century	The house is in magnesian limestone with a Welsh slate roof. There are two storeys, three bays, a lower two-storey rear wing, and flanking two-bay screen walls. The central doorway has a pediment, and the windows are sashes. The screen wall to the left contains a doorway, and the right wall acts as a front to a single-storey extension.
Craven House and Craven Lodge; 53.90570°N 1.34949°W	—	Early 19th century	A pair of houses on a corner site in magnesian limestone with a stone slate roof. There are two storeys, the right house has two bays, and the left house has three. Each house has a central doorway with an architrave and a pediment on consoles and a fanlight, the right house with crossed glazing bars, and the left house with radial glazing bars. The windows in both houses are sashes. In the left return are two inserted bow windows.
Right hand part, Crown Hotel; 53.90564°N 1.34919°W		Early 19th century	The original part of the public house, on a corner site, is in magnesian limestone, with paired brackets to the eaves cornice, and a Welsh slate roof. There are two storeys and an attic, and two bays. The doorway has a fanlight, to the right is a bow window, and in the upper floor are sash windows. The right return contains a round-headed stair window, a smaller round-headed attic window, and other inserted windows.
Highbury House; 53.90678°N 1.35289°W	—	Early 19th century	The house is in magnesian limestone with a Welsh slate roof. There are two storeys and a basement, and a symmetrical front of three bays, and at the rear are an extension and a wing. Steps with iron handrails lead up to the doorway that has a fanlight and a cornice. The windows are sashes in architraves.
Parkside House; 53.90627°N 1.36815°W	—	Early 19th century	A house in magnesian limestone with a roof of Welsh slate and stone slate. There are two storeys, three bays, and a single-storey wing on the left. The doorway has a fanlight, and the windows are sashes. In the left return is a round-headed stair window.
South Lodge and gate piers 53.90654°N 1.37707°W	—	Early 19th century	Originally, the lodge for Wetherby Grange, and now surrounded by the Grange Moor Roundabout on the A1(M) motorway. It is in sandstone on a rusticated plinth, and has a plain frieze, a moulded cornice, a balustrade, and a Welsh slate roof. There is one storey, three bays, and single-bay flanking wings. In the middle bay is a semicircular Doric distyle in antis portico approached by four steps. The outer bays each has a recessed panel containing a sash window with an architrave. Attached to the lodge is a rusticated pier with a teardrop finial, and this is linked to larger gate piers that are surmounted by sandstone pedestals with heraldic carvings. The piers are in magnesian limestone.
The Admiral Hawke; 53.90279°N 1.34061°W		Early 19th century	The public house is in magnesian limestone with a slate roof, two storeys and two bays. The central doorway has a fanlight, pilasters, a plain frieze, and a cornice. It is flanked by canted bay windows, with a plain frieze, a cornice, and a blocking course. The upper floor contains two sash windows with a blind window between them.
Willow Green; 53.90214°N 1.33638°W	—	Early 19th century	A house that was later extended, it is in magnesian limestone, and has a roof of Westmorland green slate with coped gables and kneelers. There are two storeys and cellars, and three bays. The central doorway has a fanlight, and a porch with Doric columns, a plain frieze and a cornice. The windows are sashes with architraves, there are arched cellar openings, and in the extension on the left is a two-storey bow window.
London House; 53.90290°N 1.34140°W		c. 1830	A shop with dwellings above and at the rear, the front is in sandstone, and the rest is in magnesian limestone, with a band, a frieze and a dentilled cornice, and a slate roof with coped gables. There are two storeys and three bays. The ground floor contains a shop front with a central double door flanked by large shop windows with mullions, side pilasters, and a dentilled cornice. In the angle on the right is a doorway with a fanlight, and a shaped and moulded canopy. The outer bays of the upper floor contain bow windows cantilevered over the ground floor, and between them is a blind window with an architrave.
The Vicarage and garden wall 53.90677°N 1.35348°W	—	c. 1830	The house, which was later extended, is in magnesian limestone, with paired gutter brackets and a slate roof, hipped on the left. There are two storeys, three bays, and flanking screen walls, the left converted into a two-storey one-bay wing. The doorway has a three-pane fanlight and a peaked canopy on shaped brackets, and the windows are sashes. In the right screen wall is a blind window containing a carved shield. The wall enclosing the front garden has domed coping, it sweeps down from the screen wall, and is ramped up to the square gate piers.
Spa Baths; 53.90393°N 1.34040°W	—	1833–34	The bath house, which has been converted for housing, is in magnesian limestone on a plinth, with sill bands, a hipped slate roof. There is one storey, and a U-shaped plan, with the front facing the River Wharfe. In the centre is a canted projection, and the windows are casement windows. The entrance is at the rear.
Inscribed direction stone 53.90339°N 1.34254°W	—	1834 (probable)	The stone is in magnesian limestone and is set into a wall at the entrance to Spa Lane. It is inscribed with "TO THE SPA BATHS".
64 and 66 High Street and railings 53.90698°N 1.35490°W	—	Early to mid 19th century	A pair of red brick houses with a Welsh slate roof. There are three storeys and half-basements, and three bays. Steps lead up to the central doorways that have fanlights, and are flanked by canted bay windows. Over them is an ornamental balcony with an iron balustrade. In the upper floors the central windows are blind, in the middle floor they are flanked by French windows, and in the top floor by casements. The basement area is enclosed by iron railings that rise as handrails to the steps.
Westwood House; 53.90636°N 1.35139°W		Early to mid 19th century	A house later used for other purposes, it is in magnesian limestone on a plinth, and has a fascia board with brackets and modillions under a wooden gutter, and a slate roof. There are two storeys, three bays, and a rear wing on the left. Steps lead up to a central doorway that has a fanlight, an architrave, a fluted frieze, and a pediment on consoles. The windows are sashes with architraves and three-piece wedge lintels. At the rear are a doorway, a French window, a round-arched stair window and sashes.
Spa Lane Methodist Church; 53.90422°N 1.34229°W		1846–47	The church is in magnesian limestone with a Welsh slate roof, two storeys and a basement, three bays on the front and four along the sides, and a rear wing. The front is gabled, and steps lead up to a central sandstone doorcase containing double doors with a semicircular fanlight in an architrave with pilasters, a keystone, and a peaked cornice. This flanked by small round-arched casement windows with keystones and acroteria. Above are similar, larger stepped windows.
74, 76 and 78 High Street; 53.90696°N 1.35463°W	—	Early to mid 19th century	A row of three houses in red brick with a pantile roof. There are three storeys, and each house has one bay. The doorways are recessed, and have fanlights with crossed glazing bars. Over the doorways is a wooden entablature, and by the side of each doorway is a tripartite window. The windows in the upper floors are sashes.
207–213 High Street and 1 and 2 Spa Lane; 53.90350°N 1.34277°W		Early to mid 19th century	A terrace of houses in magnesian limestone with a slate roof. There are two storeys, and an L-shaped plan, with seven bays facing High Street and four facing Spa Lane. The houses facing High Street have doorways with quoined round arches on imposts and semicircular fanlights with radial glazing bars, and bow windows. In the front facing Spa Lane are two gabled porches and a passageway. The windows in Spa Lane and the upper floor in High Street are sashes.
267 High Street; 53.90279°N 1.33540°W	—	c. 1850	A hotel, later a school, then a private house, it is in sandstone and magnesian limestone with a hipped Welsh slate roof. There are two storeys, and sides of three bays, each with a central projection. The entrance front has a plinth, a rusticated ground floor, and corner quoin pilasters. Steps lead up to the central doorway that has a triangular hood and side lights, and above are three windows with an impost band and rusticated arches. In the upper floor of the outer bays are triple round-arched windows with a cornice. Above the central doorway at the rear is a corbelled balcony with a balustrade.
Retaining wall and outbuilding 53.90295°N 1.33557°W	—	c. 1850	The retaining wall alongside the River Wharfe is in magnesian limestone and is coped. It is between 1.5 metres (4 ft 11 in) and 2 metres (6 ft 7 in) high, and contains intermediate gate piers and end piers that are square with chamfered caps. The wall incorporates a single-storey single-bay outbuilding that has a hipped Welsh slate roof and pierced eaves, and contains a doorway at the rear.
Rockholm, Stoneleigh and The Old Manse; 53.90406°N 1.34186°W	—	c. 1850	A manse, later divided into three dwellings, it is in magnesian limestone, with a wooden cornice, gutter brackets, and a Welsh slate roof. There are two storeys, a symmetrical front of five bays, the outer bays projecting and gabled, and a longer rear range. The central doorway has a fanlight and a cornice, and it is flanked by tripartite windows,. Above the doorway is a round-headed window with an architrave and flanking sash windows. In the outer bays there are canted bay windows in the ground floor, and above is a recessed round arch containing two round-headed windows.
144–152 High Street; 53.90549°N 1.34845°W	—	Mid 19th century	Originally a hotel, later five shops, they are in magnesian limestone with a Welsh slate roof. There are three storeys and nine bays. The row contains a basket-arched carriage entrance, and in the ground floor are projecting flat-roofed shop fronts. The windows in the upper floors are sashes, and in the left return is a round-headed doorway.
Wharfedale House; 53.90276°N 1.33517°W	—	Mid 19th century	A house in magnesian limestone with wooden gutter brackets and a Welsh slate roof hipped on the right. There are two storeys and three bays. The central doorway has a plain fanlight, pilasters and a cornice, and the windows are sashes.
St Mary's Church; 53.90627°N 1.34939°W		1872–84	The church is in magnesian limestone with dressings in sandstone and a green slate roof, and is in Early English style. It has a cruciform plan, consisting of a nave with a clerestory, north and south aisles, north and south transepts, a north chapel, a south vestry, a short chancel, and a west tower. The tower has three stages, angle buttresses with gablets, a northwest stair turret, a south door with a moulded pointed arch, clock faces, an ornamental string course below a parapet with corner merlons and central gablets, and a pyramidal roof with a weathervane. Most of the windows are lancets, and the east window has three stepped lights and a hood mould.
Milepost opposite Grove Farm; 53.90617°N 1.37128°W		Late 19th century	The milepost is on the north side of the A659 road. It consists of a cast iron plate on a gritstone pole, with a triangular plan and a rounded top. On the top is inscribed "TADCASTER & OTLEY ROAD" and "CLIFFORD CUM BOSTON" and on the sides are the distances to Tadcaster, Boston Spa, Wetherby, Harewood and Otley.
Milepost opposite junction with St. Mary's Street; 53.90541°N 1.34749°W		Late 19th century	The milepost is on the northeast side of High Street (A659 road). It consists of a cast iron plate on a gritstone pole, with a triangular plan and a rounded top. On the top is inscribed "TADCASTER & OTLEY ROAD" and "CLIFFORD CUM BOSTON" and on the sides are the distances to Tadcaster, Wetherby, Harewood and Otley.
Four Gables and wall 53.90590°N 1.35246°W	—	1900	A brick house in Arts and Crafts style, with sandstone dressings, partly roughcast, and a slate roof with coped gables. There are three storeys, a main front of two bays, and a small southeast wing. The main front bays are gabled, in the ground floor of the left bay is a six-light mullioned window, and the right bay is a canted bay window with a moulded band. In the upper floors of both bays are canted oriel windows. To the right is a flat-roofed single-storey porch, and a doorway with a carved and initialled lintel. Attached to the house is a brick garden wall coped with tiles and bricks, about 2.5 metres (8 ft 2 in) high, and containing a potting shed, an outhouse and a greenhouse.
