= Boston Hall, Boston Spa =

Building in Boston Spa, Leeds, West Yorkshire, England

Boston Hall
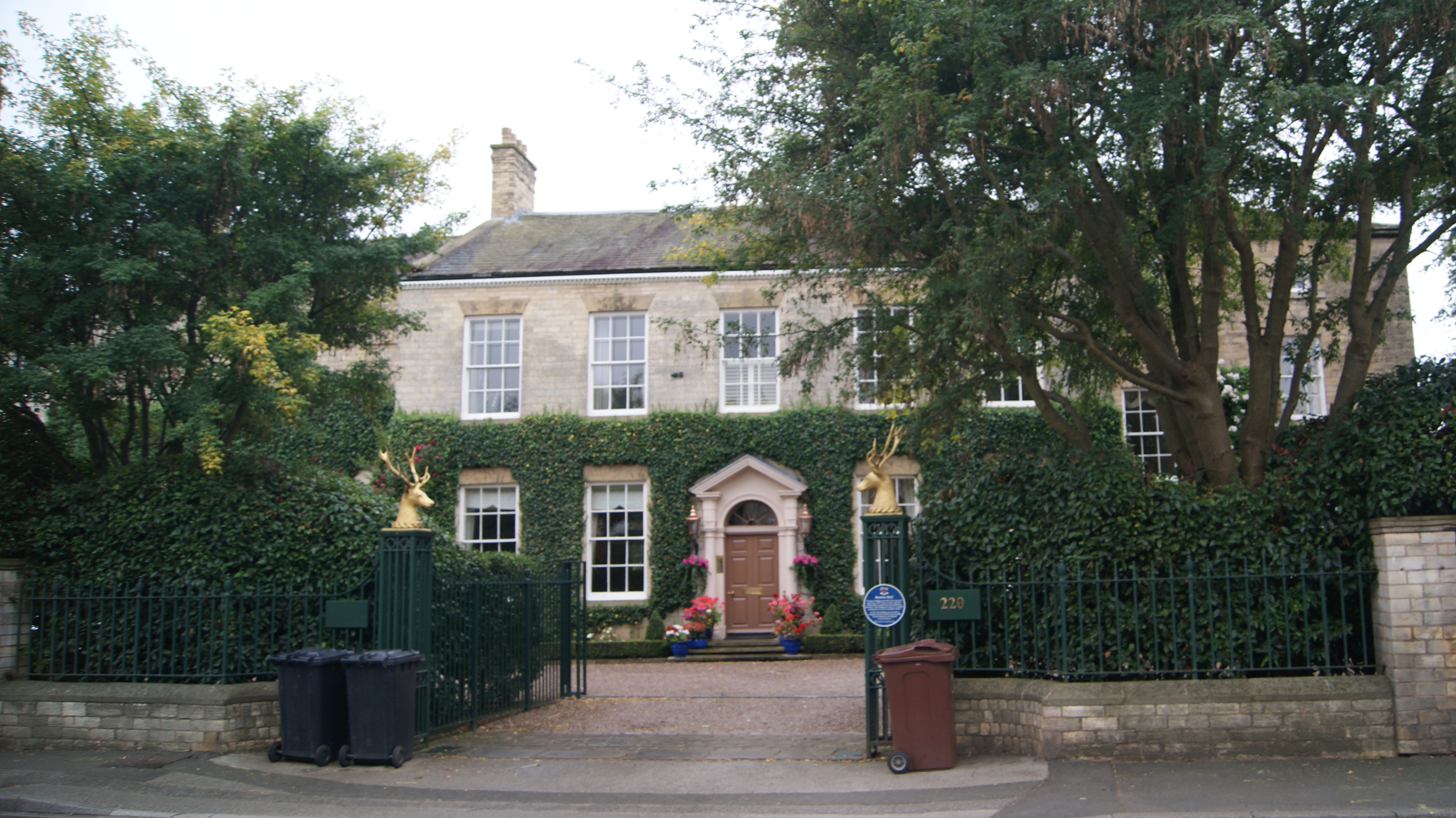
- Boston Hall, seen from High Street
- Interactive map of the Boston Hall area

General information
- Location: Boston Spa, West Yorkshire, England
- Coordinates: 53°54′11″N 1°20′35″W
- Current tenants: Geoffrey Boycott
- Construction started: 1807
- Completed: 1807
- Owner: Geoffrey Boycott

Design and construction
- Designations: Grade II listed

Boston Hall is a Grade II listed neo-classical house in Boston Spa, West Yorkshire, England.

== History ==
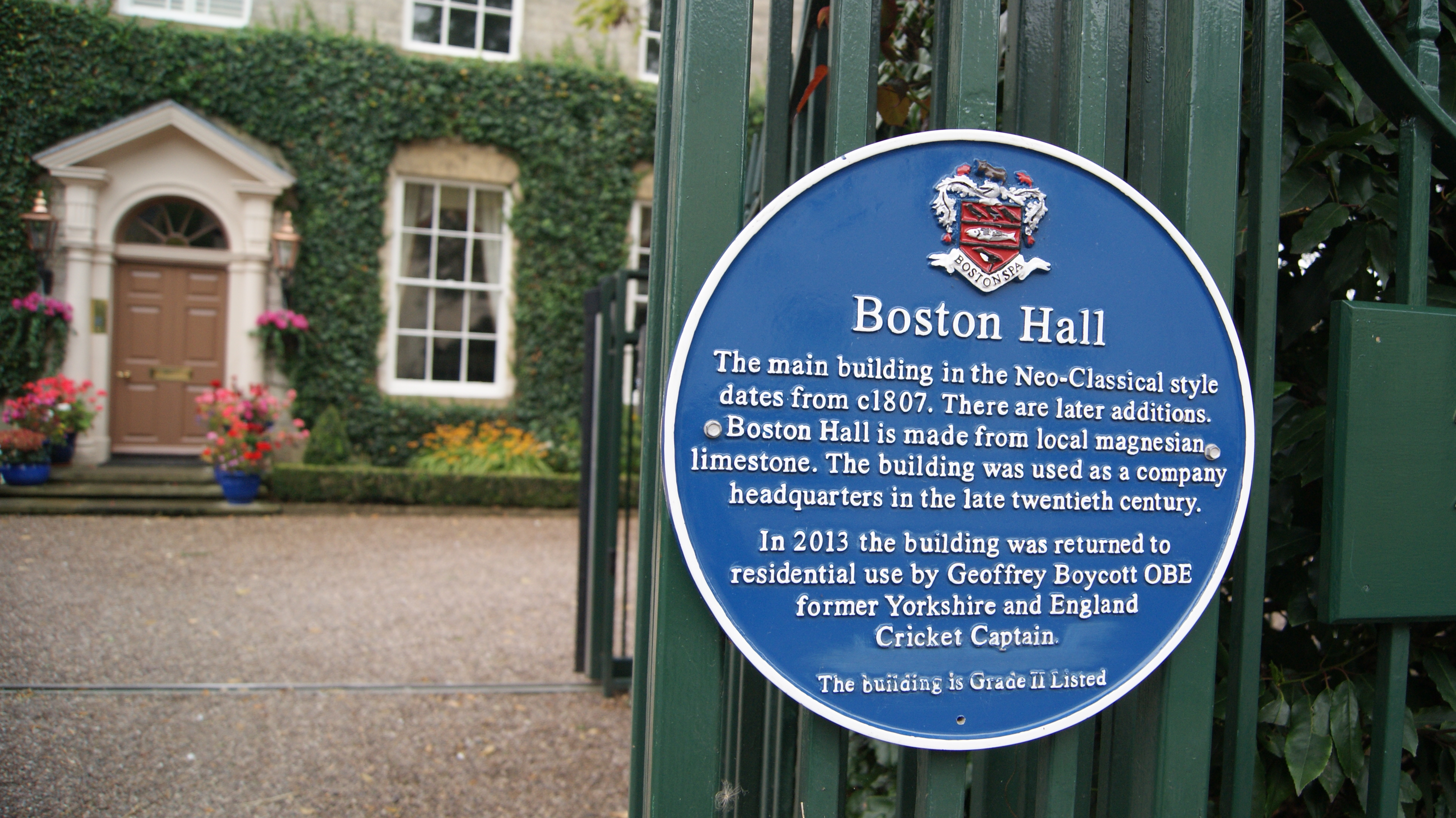
Blue plaque outside the house

The main part of the house was completed in 1807, although there are subsequent later additions. The house was Grade II listed on 30 March 1966 (List Entry Number 1135046); the listing stated that it was made of "Ashlar magnesian limestone" with a "stone slate roof" and consisted of three stories, a two-storey rear wing and an attached wall. At that time, the house was being used as a store selling furniture.

In 1939 Boston Hall was the home of Charles H. Roe and his wife Kathleen.

Later, for many years, the house was used as offices by the Ogden Group. In 2013, planning permission was sought to return the building to residential use after the purchase of the property by former England and Yorkshire cricketer, Geoffrey Boycott. The plan was approved.

In 2019, the property was listed for sale by Boycott because he and his wife Rachel planned to move to the Cheshire area where their daughter was residing. A report at that time indicated that the property consisted of four elements, each with its own entrance: "the main house, the west wing, the cottage and the flat". Features included 11 bedrooms, several reception rooms and a huge eat-in kitchen.

== Architecture ==
The house has two storeys and is built out of squared magnesian limestone with five bays to the main part, it has a pitched slate roof. The west wing of the house is of three storeys and has two bays.

== See also ==
- Listed buildings in Boston Spa
