= Listed buildings in Warmsworth =

Warmsworth is a civil parish in the metropolitan borough of Doncaster, South Yorkshire, England. The parish contains eight listed buildings that are recorded in the National Heritage List for England. Of these, one is listed at Grade II*, the middle of the three grades, and the others are at Grade II, the lowest grade. The parish contains the village of Warmsworth and the surrounding countryside. The most important building in the parish is Warmsworth Hall, which is listed, together with associated structures. The other listed buildings are a bell tower, a former Quaker meeting house, a barn, a pair of houses, and a bridge.

== Key ==
Grade	Criteria
II*	Particularly important buildings of more than special interest
II	Buildings of national importance and special interest

== Buildings ==
Name and location	Photograph	Date	Notes	Grade
Bell tower 53.49922°N 1.17561°W		16th century (probable)	The bell tower is in magnesian limestone, and the timber cupola was added in the 20th century. It has a single cell and two storeys. The lower storey is square with quoins, and in the upper storey it becomes octagonal. The cupola has open arcaded sides, and a pyramidal roof with a spike finial.	II
Warmsworth Hall; 53.49937°N 1.17665°W		1702	A large house, later used for other purposes, it is in magnesian limestone, on a plinth, with rusticated quoins, a cornice above the ground floor, and a cornice to the hipped stone slate roof. There are two storeys and attics, and an H-shaped plan, consisting of a front containing a three-bay hall range, and flanking two-bay cross-wings, and the left return has five bays. In the centre of the hall range is a doorway with an architrave, a keystone, and a carved pediment on consoles. Above, and rising from the top floor, is a panel over a broken segmental pediment, containing a keyed oeil-de-boeuf, over which is a cornice and a balustrade. In the left wing is a continuous porch on Doric columns, under which is a doorway with a fanlight on the right. Elsewhere, there are sash windows, and in the roof are gabled dormers. In the centre of the left return is a porch with columns and a doorway in an architrave.	II*
Eastern gate piers, Warmsworth Hall; 53.49914°N 1.17586°W	—	c. 1702	The gate piers at the eastern entrance to the grounds of the hall are in magnesian limestone. They have a square section, and each pier has a moulded plinth, recessed panels, a broad cornice, and an obelisk finial.	II
Western gate piers, Warmsworth Hall; 53.49883°N 1.17734°W	—	c. 1702	The gate piers at the western entrance to the grounds of the hall are in magnesian limestone. They have a square section, and each pier has a moulded plinth, recessed panels, a broad cornice, and an obelisk finial.	II
Former Quaker Meeting House; 53.49952°N 1.17839°W	—	1706	The meeting house, later used for other purposes, is in magnesian limestone and has a Welsh slate roof with coped gables, shaped kneelers, and a weathervane. There is a single storey and a loft, and three bays. The doorway has a quoined surround, and a lintel with a cambered soffit, above which is a casement window. The doorway is flanked by sash windows, and in the right return in a boarded hatch in the gable.	II
Barn, West Farm; 53.49893°N 1.17955°W	—	Early 18th century (probable)	A small barn in magnesian limestone, the right gable end is rebuilt in brick, and it has a pantile roof. There is one storey and three bays. The front contains a doorway with a cambered arch and slit vents, and in the left gable end is a hatch.	II
Warmsworth House and The Annexe; 53.49919°N 1.17872°W		Late 18th century	A pair of houses, the later one from the early 19th century, in magnesian limestone, with roofs of pantile and Westmorland slate. They have two storeys, Warmsworth House has five bays, a two-bay extension on the left, and a two-bay rear wing, and The Annexe is interlocked at right angles, and has two bays. Warmsworth House has a plinth, quoins, and a floor band, and it contains a French window and sash windows. On the right return is a porch, and a doorway with an architrave and a pediment on consoles, it is flanked by casement windows, and above is a shaped gable.	II
Bridge over the River Don; 53.50721°N 1.18920°W		1864 (probable)	The bridge carries Mill Lane over the River Don, and the central span was replaced in 1897. The span is in iron, and the walling of the piers and the causeway is in sandstone. Both of the causeways have three segmental arches, with rusticated voussoirs springing from moulded imposts, brick soffits, and cornices under coped parapets that end in piers, each having a frieze and a modillion cornice. The central span has a square-latticed balustrade.	II
