= St Edward King and Confessor Catholic Church, Clifford =

St Edward King and Confessor Church
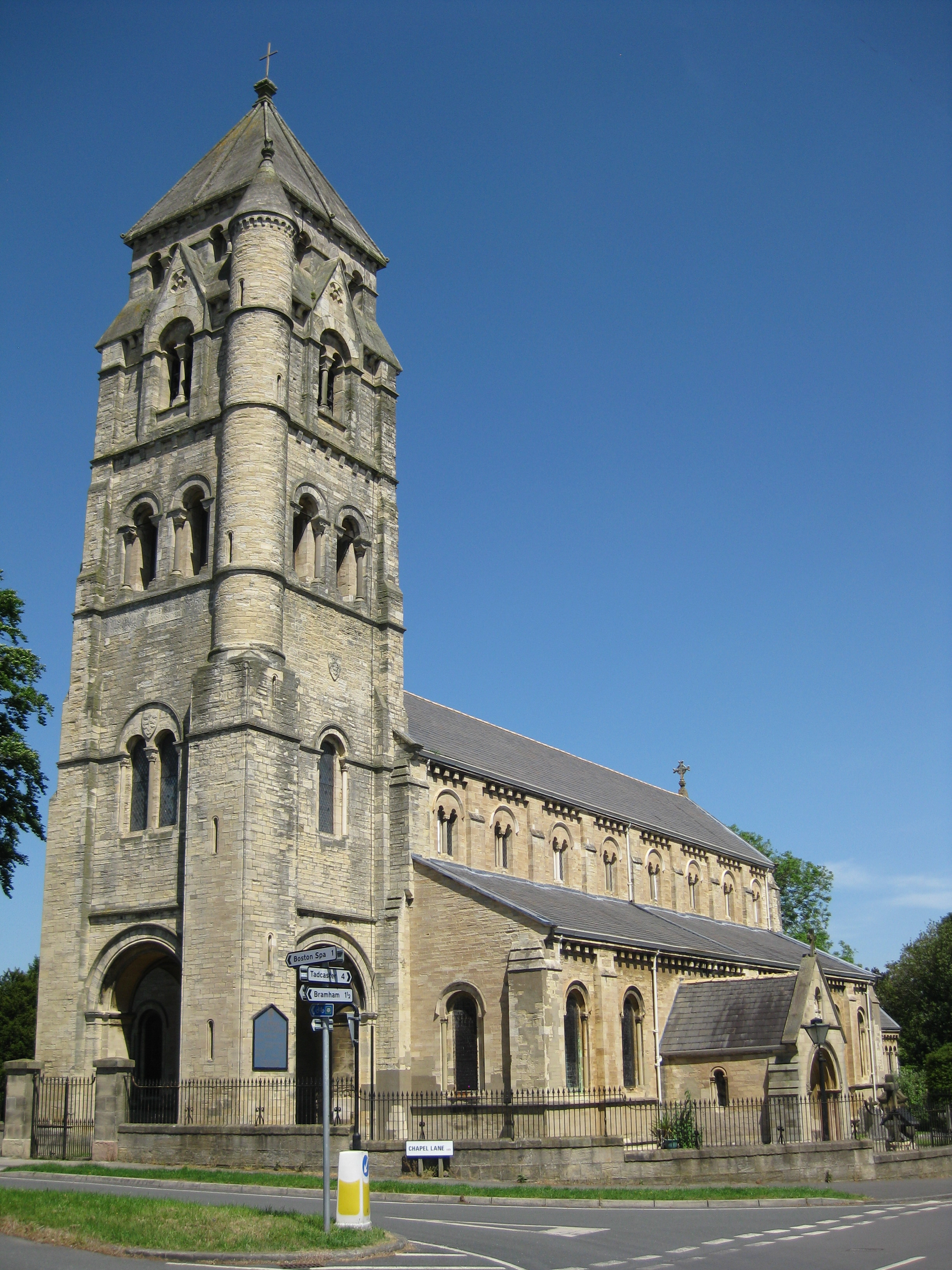
- St Edward King and Confessor Church 2017
- St Edward King and Confessor Church
- 53.8934°N 1.3467°W
- OS grid reference: SE 43042 44332
- Location: Clifford, Leeds, West Yorkshire
- Country: England
- Denomination: Roman Catholic

Administration
- Diocese: Leeds
- Deanery: Harrogate
- Parish: Clifford

Saint Edward King and Confessor Church is a Roman Catholic church in Clifford, West Yorkshire, England. The church is the largest in Clifford and its tall tower is the most prominent structure in the area. The church is a grade II Listed building and serves Clifford and the surrounding villages. The church lies in the Roman Catholic diocese of Leeds and deanery of Harrogate.

== History ==
The church was built to serve the population of Irish workers that came to work in the flax mill owned by the Grimston Brothers that was established in the village in 1831. The Grimstons, Cliffords and Vavasour families contributed to the cost of building the church. It was built in the Romanesque style by J.A. Hansom to designs by Ramsay between 1845 and 1848. The tower was built to designs by George Goldie and completed in 1866-7. It was built on the site of a former Wesleyan Chapel, hence its location on Chapel Lane, where it joins the High Street.

== Interior ==
There is a three-bay arcade under the west organ gallery in the tower. The aisle arcades have plain cylindrical piers and octagonal capitals to round arches. The two eastern bays form the sanctuary.

Two of the stained glass windows, in the Lady Chapel and north aisle, has been attributed to Augustus Pugin (1848). Five windows are by Antoine Lusson, or Lusson and Bourdant, of France (1850s).

== Exterior ==
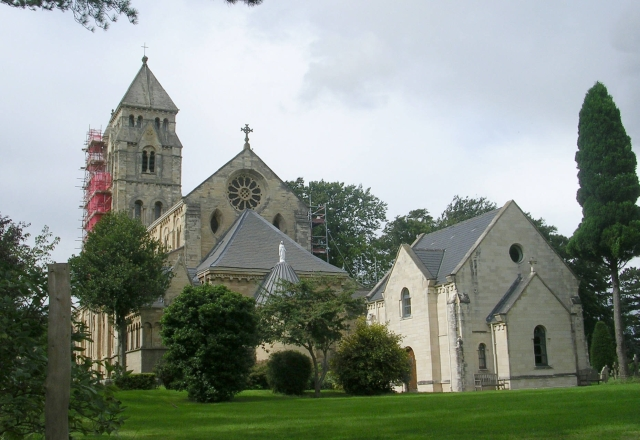
The rear of the church

The church is built in ashlar Magnesian Limestone and has a green slate roof in the Romanesque style. There is a seven bay aisled nave and chancel with small east Lady Chapel and a five-stage west tower with buttresses to the fourth stage. At the southwest corner of the tower there is a square stair-turret which becomes cylindrical after the second stage and has a conical roof above the fifth stage. The base of the tower is open to the first stage and has round arches on three sides. The tower has a pyramidal ashlar roof with a finial. The vestry is on the north side and on the south side there is a chapel.

The churchyard contains a war grave of an Army Air Corps soldier of World War II.

== Gallery ==
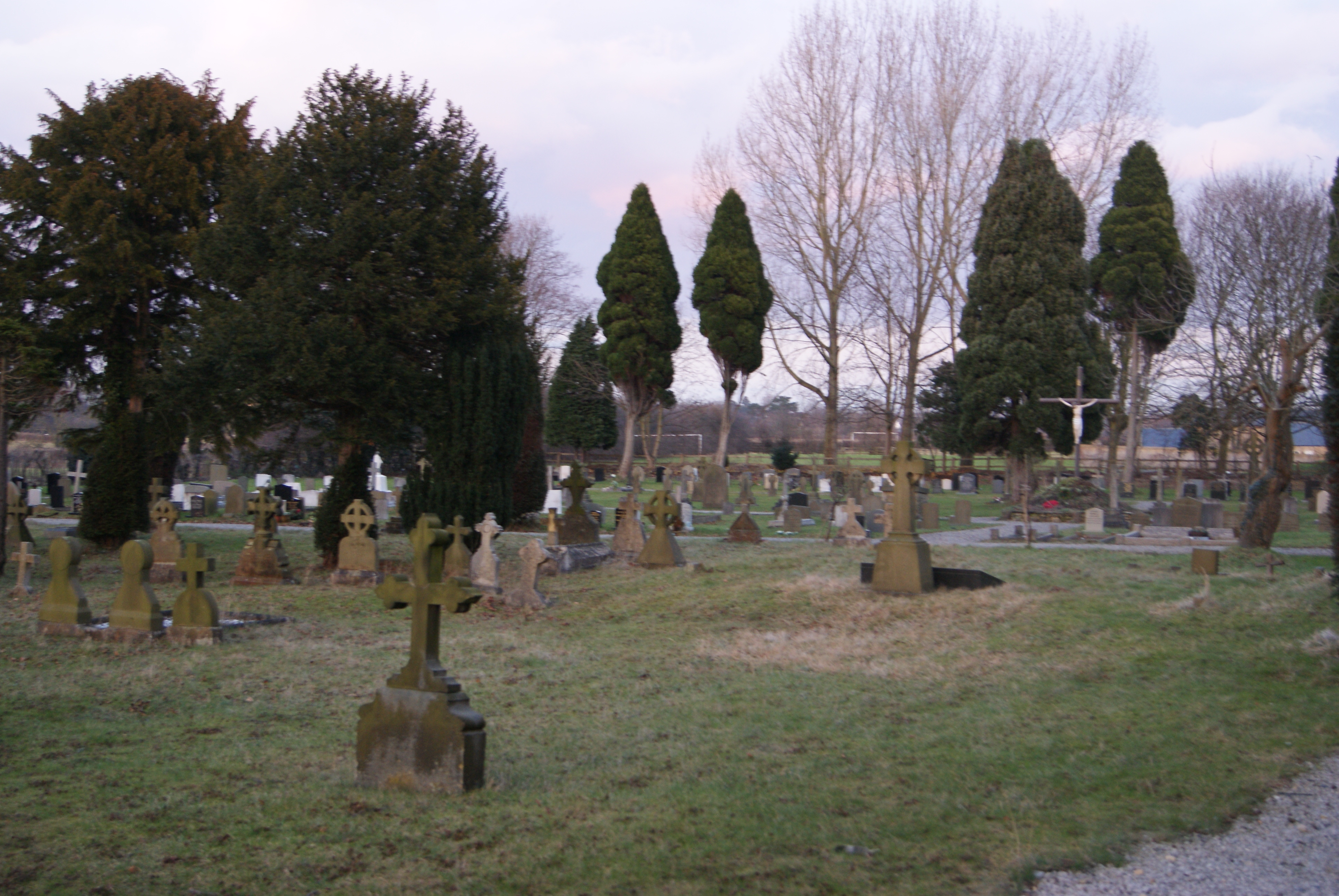
Church cemetery

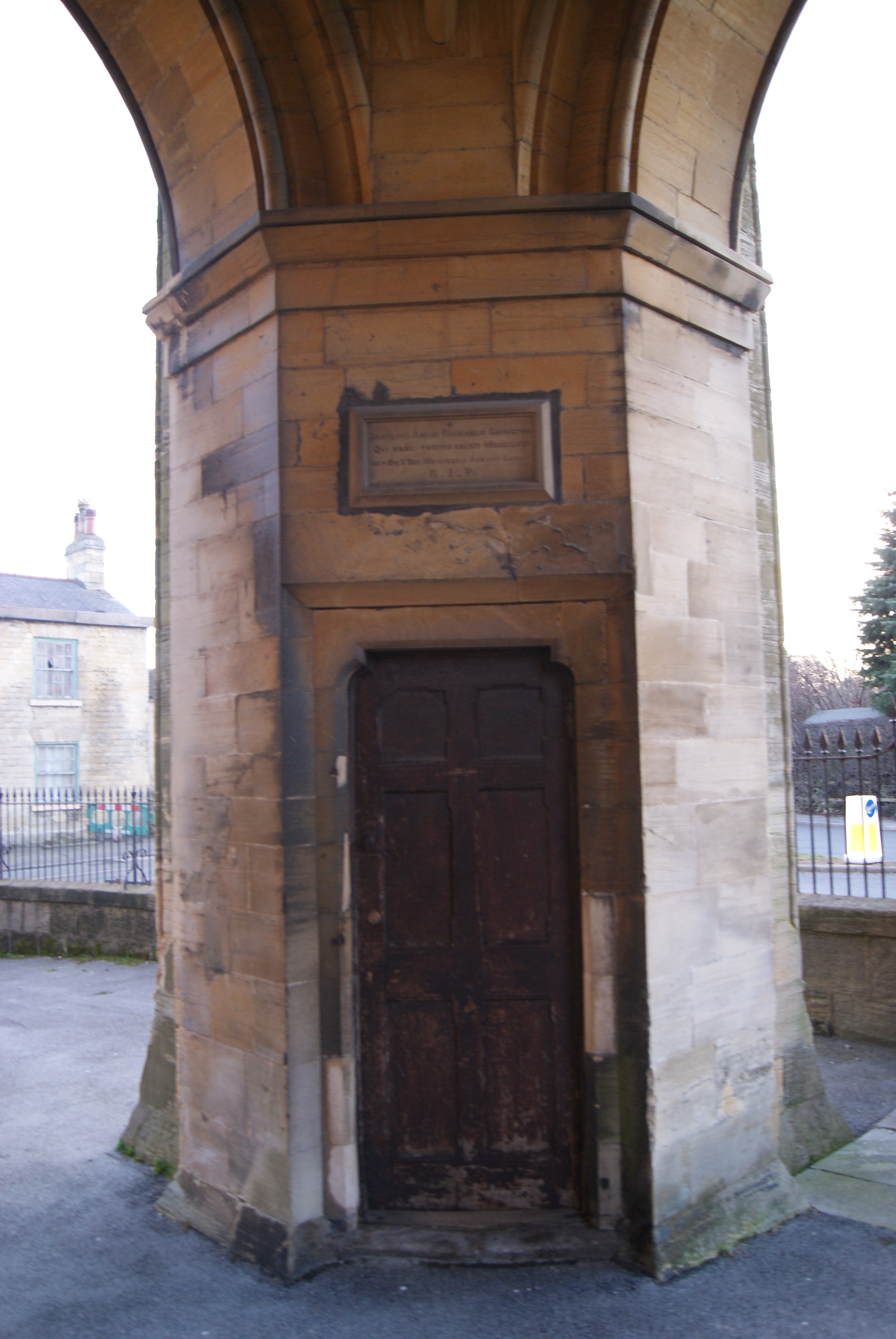
Door built into the tower

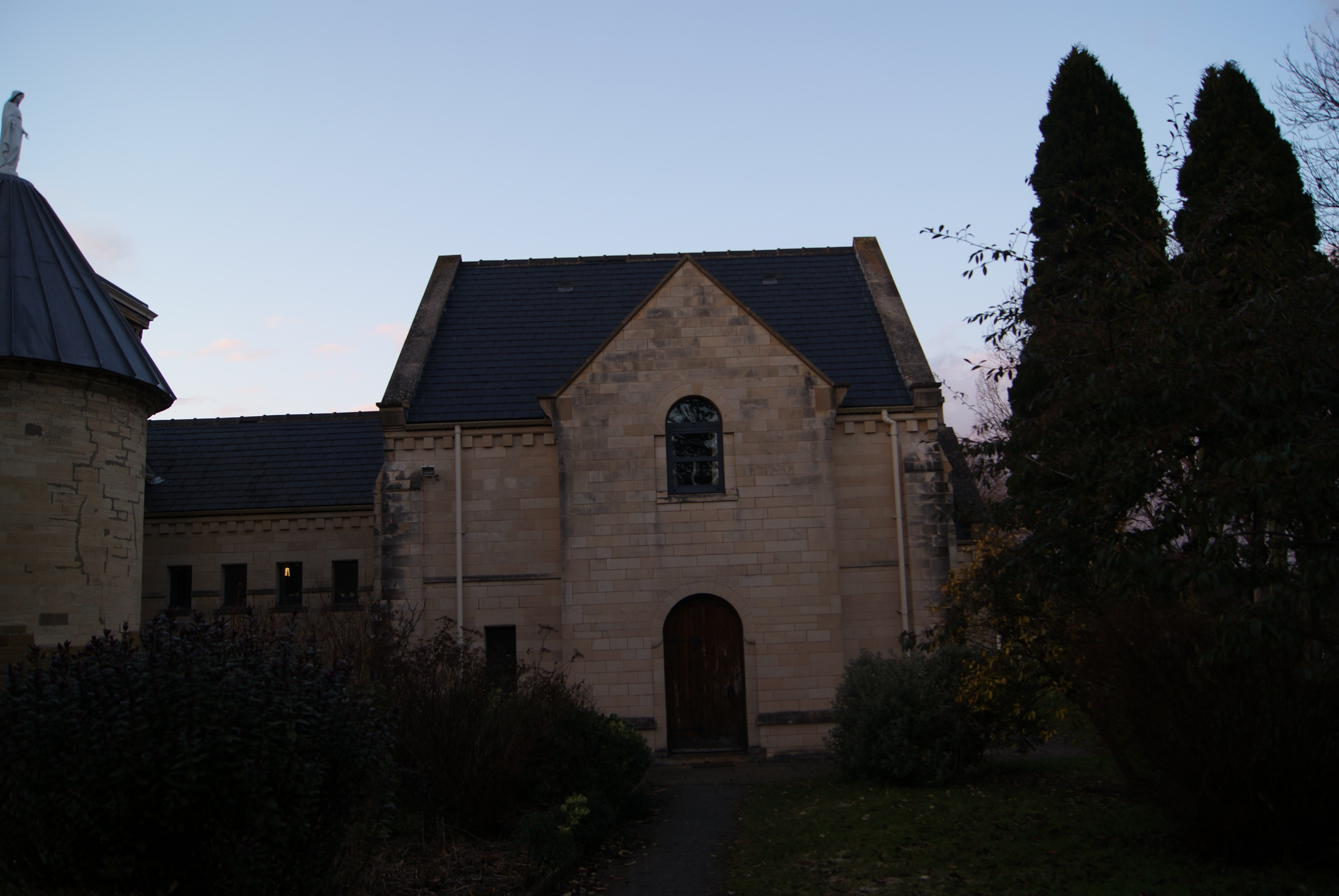
Extension to the rear

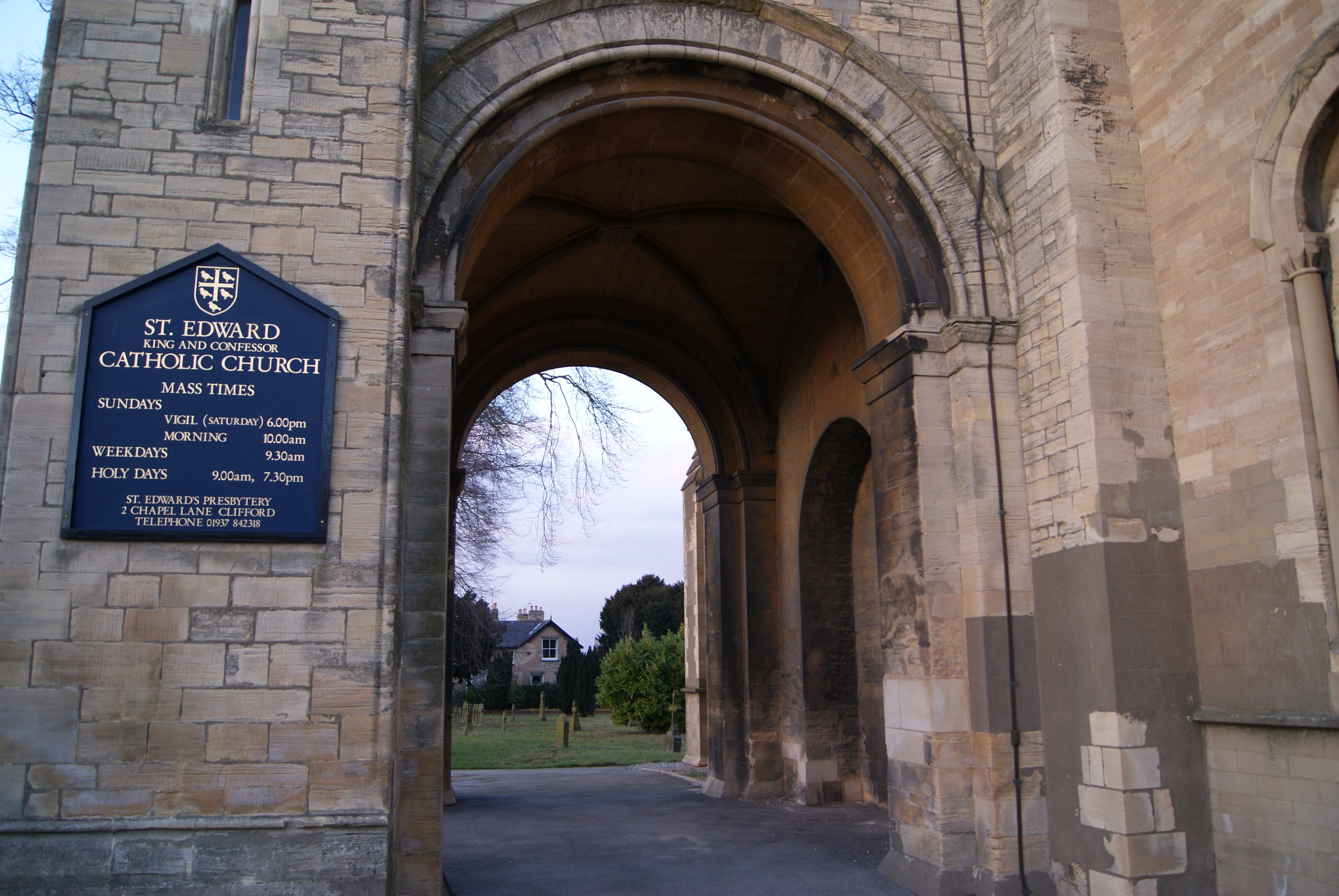
Arch to the bottom of the tower

== See also ==
- Leeds Cathedral
- Listed buildings in Clifford, West Yorkshire
