= Boston Spa =

Village and civil parish in West Yorkshire, England

Coordinates: 53.904°N 1.350°W

- Village
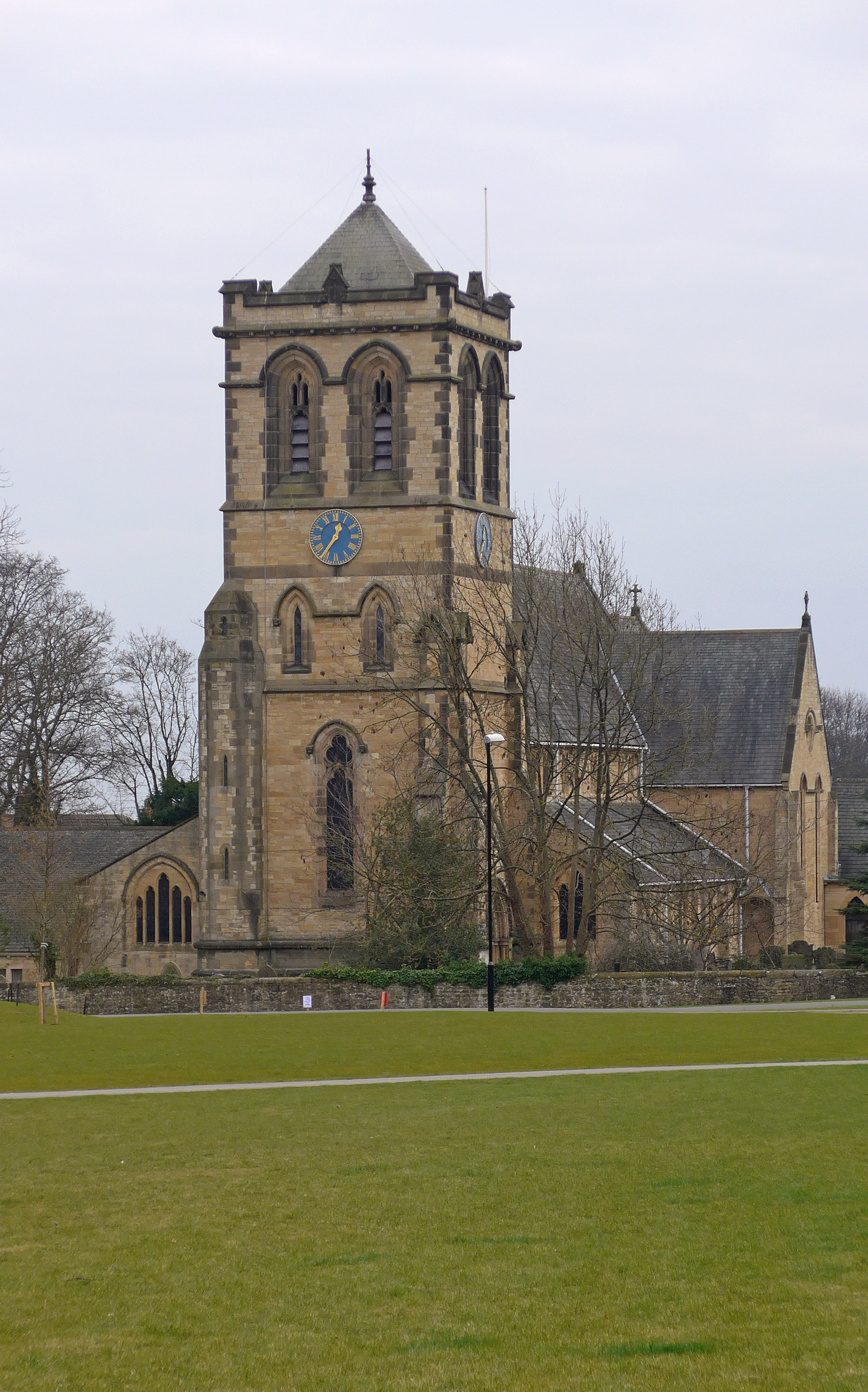
- At Mary's Parish Church

- Location within City of Leeds Location within West Yorkshire
- Area: 1.37 sq mi (3.5 km^{2})
- Population: 4,079 (2011 census)
  - Density: 2,977/sq mi (1,149/km^{2})
- OS grid reference: SE431455
  - London: 170 mi (270 km) SSE
- Civil parish: Boston Spa
- Metropolitan borough: City of Leeds
- Metropolitan county: West Yorkshire
- Region: Yorkshire and the Humber
- Country: England
- Sovereign state: United Kingdom
- Post town: WETHERBY
- Postcode district: LS23
- Dialling code: 01937
- Police: West Yorkshire
- Fire: West Yorkshire
- Ambulance: Yorkshire
- UK Parliament: Wetherby and Easingwold

Boston Spa is a village and civil parish in the Leeds Metropolitan District in West Yorkshire, England. Situated 3 miles (5 km) south of Wetherby, Boston Spa is on the south bank of the River Wharfe across from Thorp Arch. According to the 2001 census, the parish had a population of 4,006 rising to 4,079 in the 2011 census.

The village grew in the 18th century around sulphur springs that briefly made it a spa town. Today it is best known for its association with the British Library, whose principal storage and document-supply campus, holding the majority of the United Kingdom's national collection, adjoins the village to the north-east at Thorp Arch and is known as the library's Boston Spa site.

It sits in the Wetherby ward of Leeds City Council and the Wetherby and Easingwold parliamentary constituency.

== Etymology ==
Boston Spa's name is not attested before appearing on printed maps in 1771, when it was labelled Thorp Spaw, presumably 'the spa associated with Thorp Arch' (the nearest settlement). The Boston element is attested in 1799 as Bostongate and in 1822 as Boston, probably the surname of a local family, whose name derives from Boston, Lincolnshire, and their name was given to the settlement that grew up around the spa.

== History ==
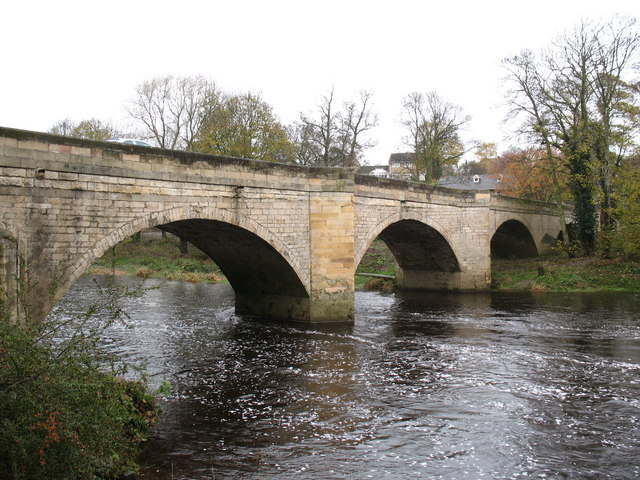
Thorp Arch Bridge

The Boston Spa hoard, a Romano-British coin hoard dating to the mid second-century AD and comprising a grey ware vessel and 172 silver denarii, was found in the town in 1848.

In 1744, John Shires established a spa resort when he discovered sulphur springs in the magnesian limestone. It was originally known as Thorp Spaw. In 1753, the Tadcaster to Otley road that passes through Boston Spa was turnpiked. In the same year, Joseph Taite built a house to accommodate visitors, it became the Royal Hotel which is still standing, but converted into flats and shops. By 1819, Boston Spa had a population of more than 600, and several inns and other houses offering accommodation had been built. Spa baths were built to allow visitors to take the waters. The spa declined when Harrogate became popular as a spa town.

The Boston Spa and Thorp Arch Conservation Area, designated in 1969, extended across Boston Spa and Thorp Arch parishes. It was revised and divided in 2009, restricting the boundaries to Boston Spa parish and reshaped to exclude areas of late-20th-century estate housing to the south of the High Street. The conservation area boundary focuses on the historic settlement. It was extended to the west, to encompass West End, an area of dwellings constructed during the Second World War to house workers from Thorp Arch munitions factory. The war had a major effect on Boston Spa's population, society and surroundings, and the buildings stand as a testament to that history.

== Governance ==
When Boston Spa was founded in 1744 it was in the township of Clifford in the old parish of Bramham, in the upper division of the wapentake of Barkston Ash, in the West Riding of Yorkshire. From 1866 to 1896, it was part of the civil parish of Clifford with Boston, and became a separate civil parish in 1896. The parish was in Wetherby Rural District in the West Riding of Yorkshire until 1974, when it was transferred to the City of Leeds in the new county of West Yorkshire.

== Geography ==
Boston Spa is in the north-east of the City of Leeds district about three miles south-east of Wetherby and immediately north of Clifford on the Collingham to Tadcaster road, the A659. The village is at a bridging point on the south side of the River Wharfe, linked to Thorp Arch on the north bank by Thorp Arch Bridge. The village, surrounded by rolling, arable farmland, developed along High Street with Bridge Road at the centre. The A1(M) motorway that passes to the west is accessed at Junction 45.

The village is on the narrow Permian Magnesian Limestone ridge that runs north-south from North Yorkshire to Nottinghamshire.

== Amenities ==
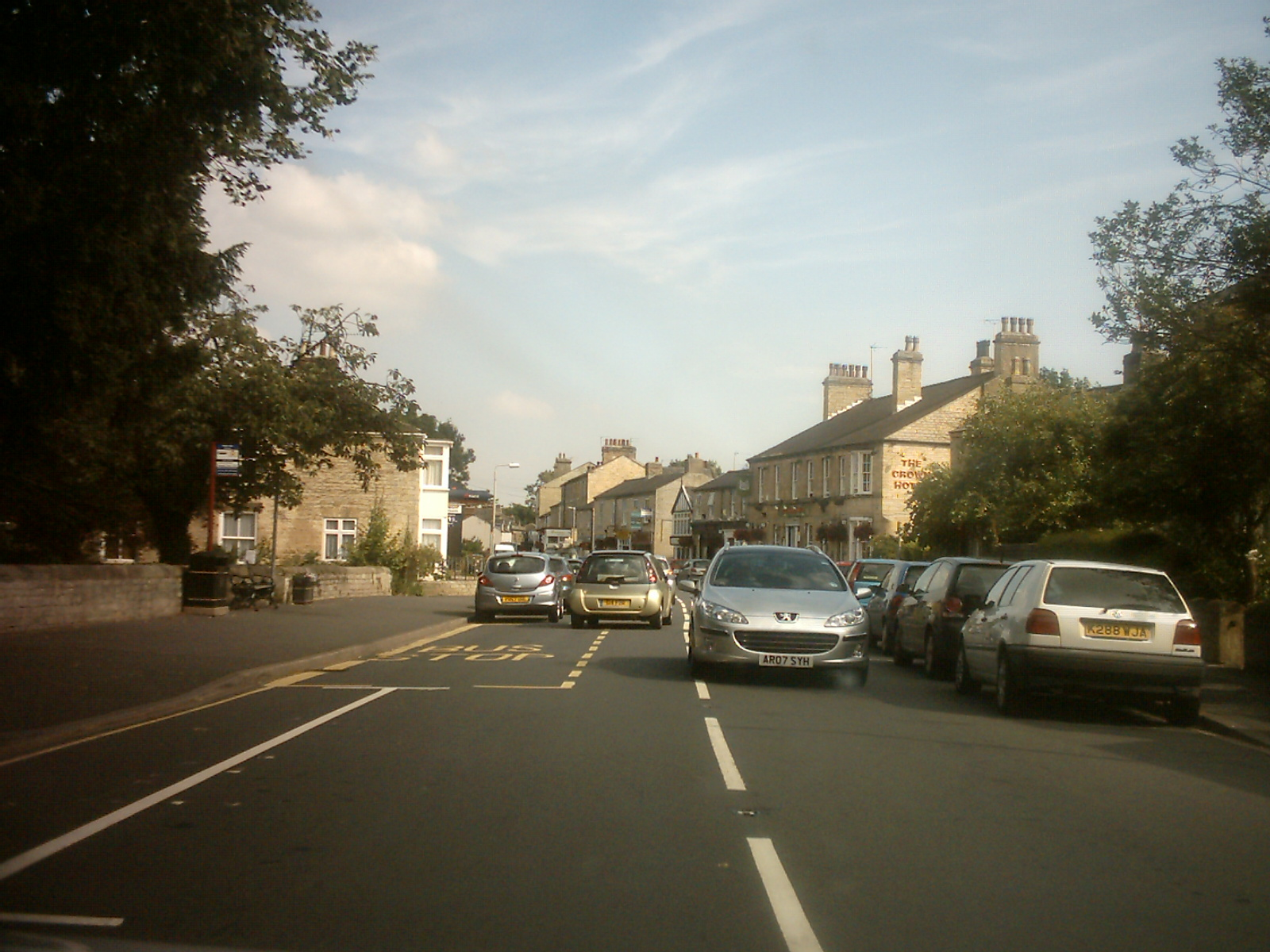
High Street, Boston Spa in 2008; The Crown Hotel is visible on the right.

Boston Spa has a post office and a small library, as well as two churches: St Mary's Parish Church and Boston Spa Methodist Church.

Commercial operations include a filling station, a small Costcutter supermarket in the former Royal Hotel and several independent retailers in the village centre, including a butcher and several takeaway restaurants. The village has three pubs: the Admiral Hawke and the Fox and Hounds, both owned by Samuel Smith Old Brewery, and The Crown, owned by a group of private investors. The Crown was formerly a hotel, which closed in 2012 and was subject to a public inquiry as to its future use. Tesco intended to purchase the site for conversion to a Tesco Express despite local opposition, but their plans for alterations to the building were rejected by Leeds City Council.

== Education ==
The village primary schools are: Primrose Lane Primary School, St Edward's Catholic Primary School and St Mary's CE Primary School.

Close by in Clifford is Boston Spa Academy, the local secondary school taking pupils from areas which also feed comprehensives in Wetherby, Garforth and Pendas Fields. The school has success in sports and science teaching, and caters for pupils undertaking GCSEs, A levels, GNVQs and those with special needs according to its Ofsted reports.

Other educational establishments in Clifford include the children's hospice Martin House and St John's Catholic School for the Deaf which has a UK-wide catchment.

== Media ==
Local news and television programmes are provided by BBC Yorkshire and ITV Yorkshire. Television signals are received from the Emley Moor TV transmitter. Local radio stations are BBC Radio Leeds, Heart Yorkshire, Capital Yorkshire, Greatest Hits Radio West Yorkshire, Hits Radio West Yorkshire and Tempo FM, a community based station which broadcast from Wetherby. Local newspaper is served by the Wetherby News.

== Housing ==
Boston Spa has a mix of private and council houses. Most of the council housing is situated around Clifford Moor Road and Wickham Avenue. The east side of Boston Spa comprises mainly larger houses. There are many Georgian villas and town houses on High Street.

== Events ==
The village annual gala is held in June. Since 2009 a beer festival takes place in the village hall. The village hall has hosted a nationally renowned weekly jazz night since January 2005 and an annual arts festival usually in October.

== Sport and recreation ==
Boston Spa Hockey Club is a field hockey club that competes in the North Hockey League and the Yorkshire & North East Hockey League.

The route of the White Rose Way, a long-distance walk from Leeds to Scarborough, North Yorkshire passes through the village. As does the Ebor Way which passes over the river at Thorp Arch village before continuing towards Tadcaster.

== British Library ==
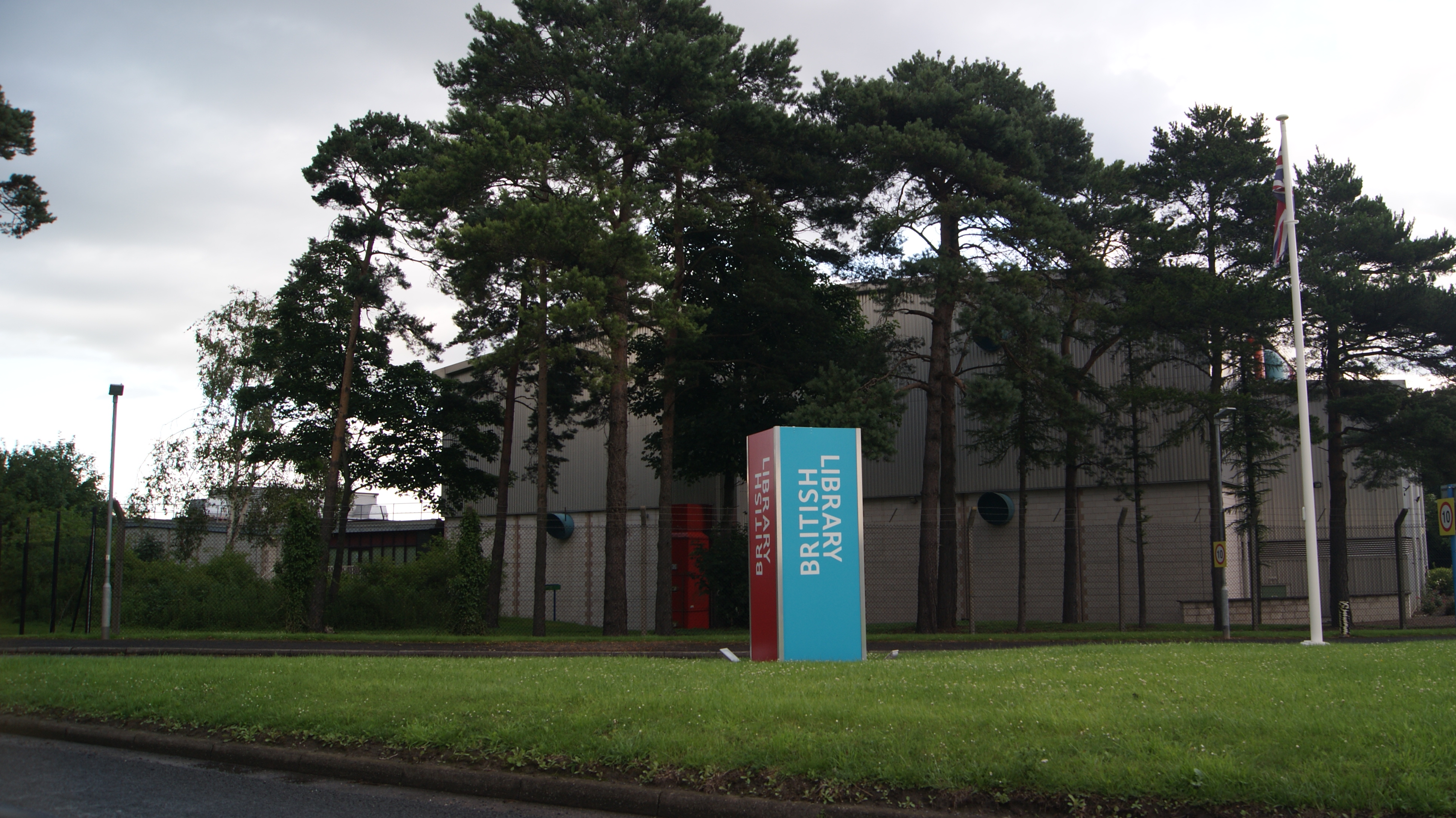
The Boston Spa branch of the British Library

The Boston Spa branch of the British Library, the Document Supply Service, is 1.5 miles (2.4 km) north-east of the village in the Thorp Arch Trading Estate. The branch contains the British Library newspaper collection.

== Gallery ==
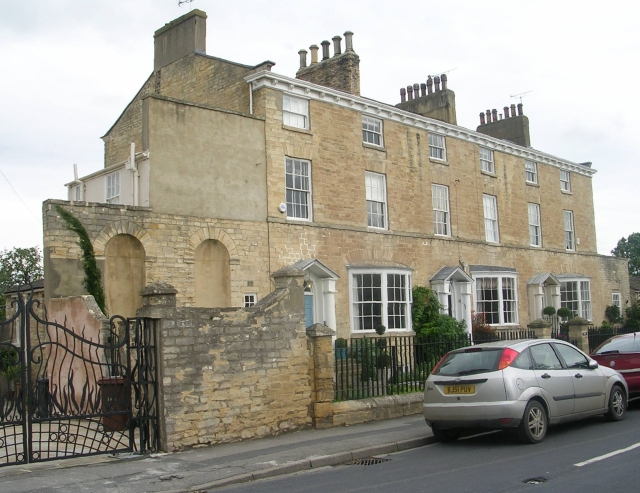
Georgian houses on High Street

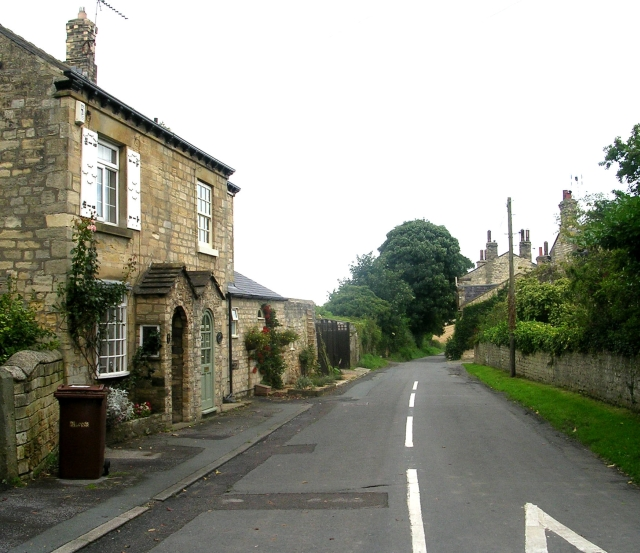
Leys Lane

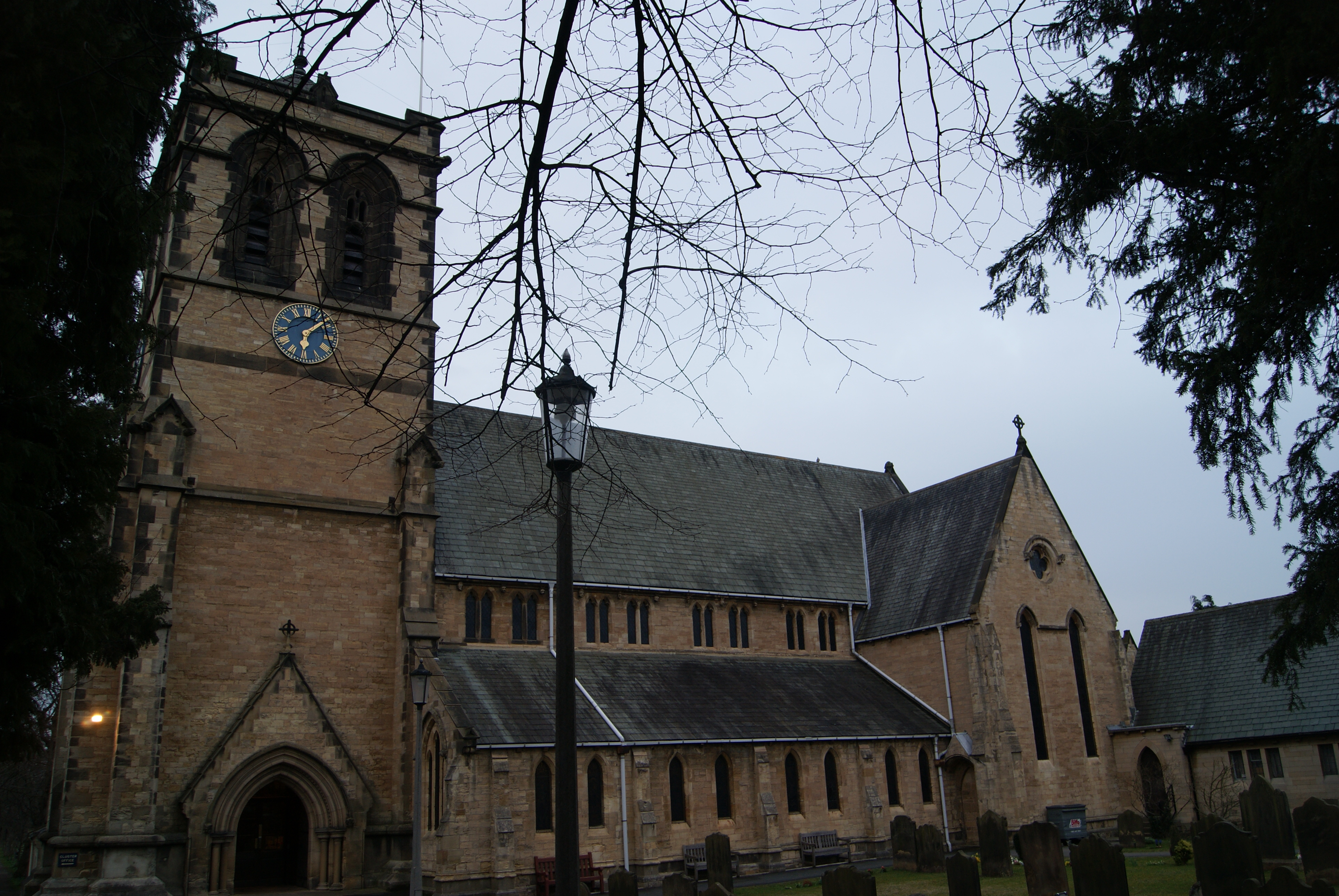
St. Mary the Virgin church

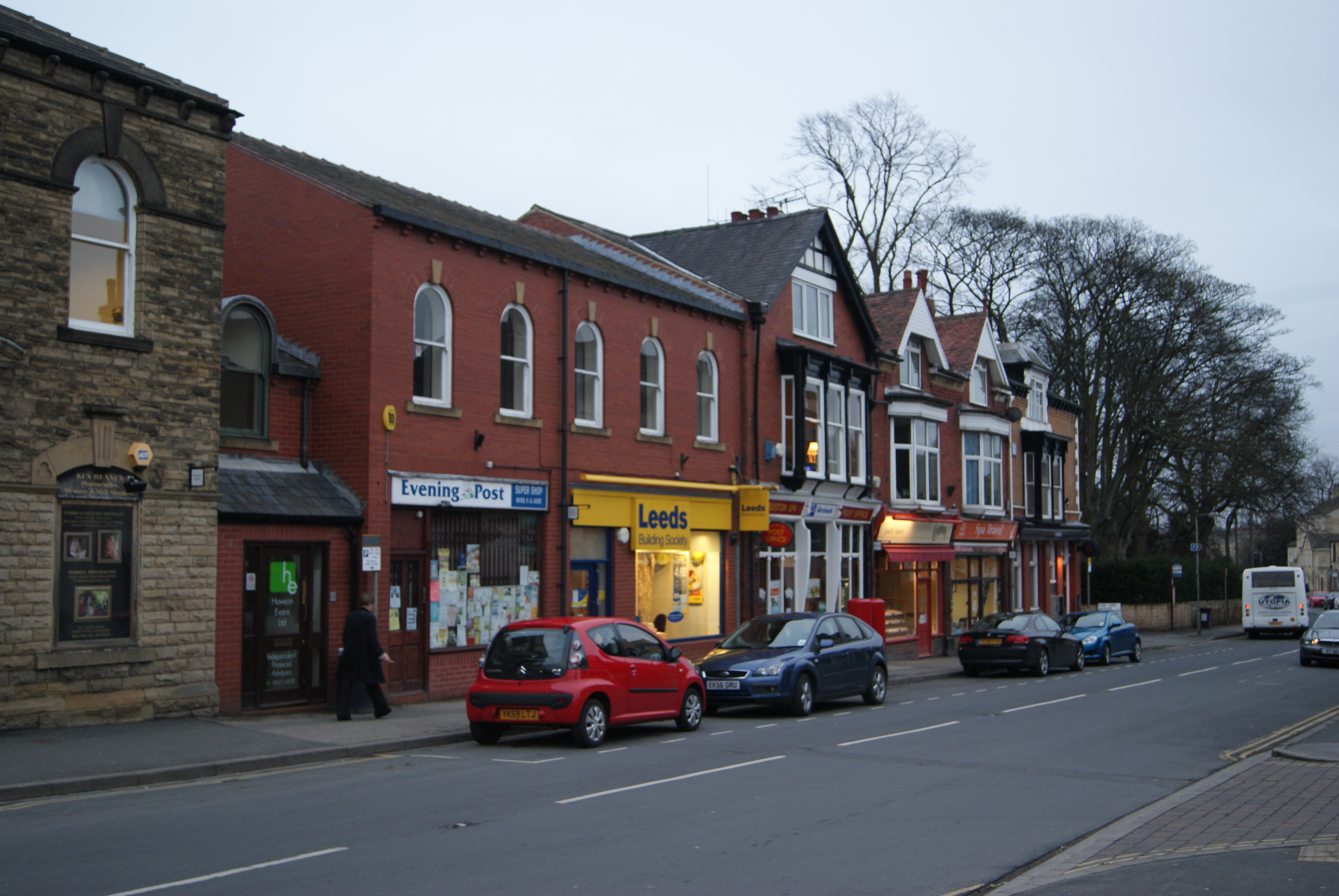
High Street

== See also ==
- Listed buildings in Boston Spa
