= Boston Spa Methodist Church =

Methodist church in West Yorkshire, England

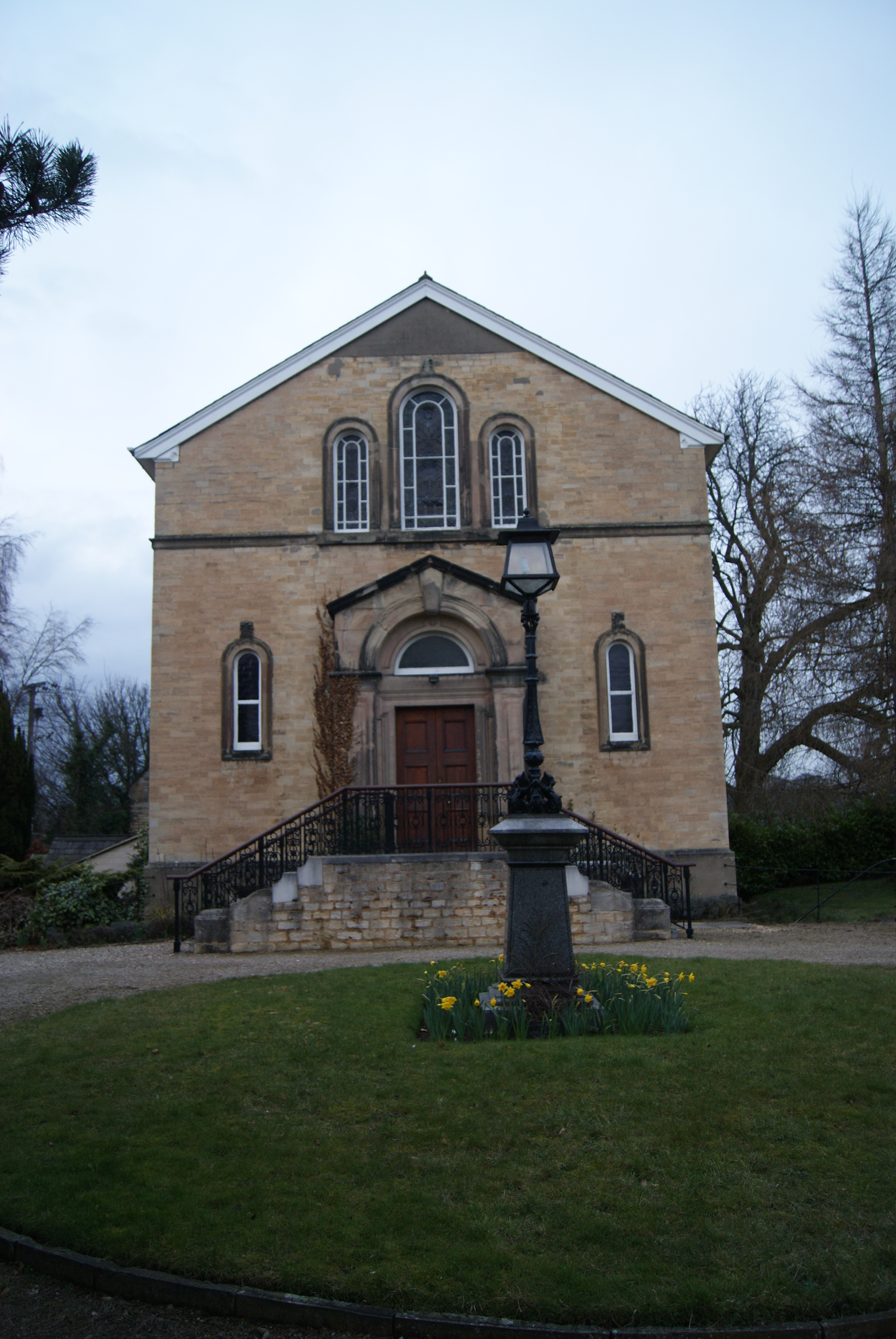
- Boston Spa Methodist Church
- Boston Spa Methodist Church
- 53.9042°N 1.3422°W
- OS grid reference: SE 43314 45537
- Location: Boston Spa, Leeds, West Yorkshire
- Country: England
- Denomination: Methodist Church of Great Britain

Boston Spa Methodist Church is an active Methodist Church of Great Britain church in Boston Spa, West Yorkshire, England. The church is Grade II listed, having been designated so on 30 April 1982.

== History ==
The church dates from 1846 and was built to a design by Atkinson of York. The foundation stone was laid November 1846; the church dedicated October 1847. The debt incurred for construction of £1000 building debt was satisfied in 1863. The first preacher was George Macdonald who became grandfather to Stanley Baldwin and Rudyard Kipling.

== Architecture ==
=== Exterior ===
The church is built of magnesian limestone and has a pitched Welsh slate roof and is of an Italianate style. The building has two storeys with the gable to the front. There are steps at the front. There is a small lean-to extension dating from 1986.

=== Interior ===
The fittings include pine box pews and a semi-octagonal pulpit. There is a round-arched recess for organ to the rear which contains a wooden organ by Harrison and Harrison.

== See also ==
- Listed buildings in Boston Spa
