= Wetherby News =

British local newspaper

Coordinates: 53.9276°N 1.2829°W

- Type: Weekly newspaper
- Format: Tabloid (Broadsheet prior to 2012)
- Owner(s): Ackrill Media Group
- Founded: 1859
- Political alignment: Neutral
- Website: wetherbynews.co.uk

The Wetherby News is a local weekly tabloid newspaper published on a Thursday and based in Wetherby, West Yorkshire, England.

The newspaper was founded in 1859 with its offices on the High Street next to the Angel Inn.

The paper is part of the National World stable.

The paper's news and sport patch includes Wetherby, Tadcaster, Boston Spa and Sherburn-in-Elmet, covering local events from rural North Yorkshire to parts of urban north Leeds such as Slaid Hill, Alwoodley and Whinmoor. The newspaper used to have its offices on Westgate in Wetherby, but it is now produced from Harrogate.

The Wetherby News carries a large property supplement, covering Wetherby as well as the surrounding districts. It also has an in-depth weekend supplement, a full weekly guide to what's on in West and North Yorkshire, entertainment news, live music and cinema guides and full classified listings.

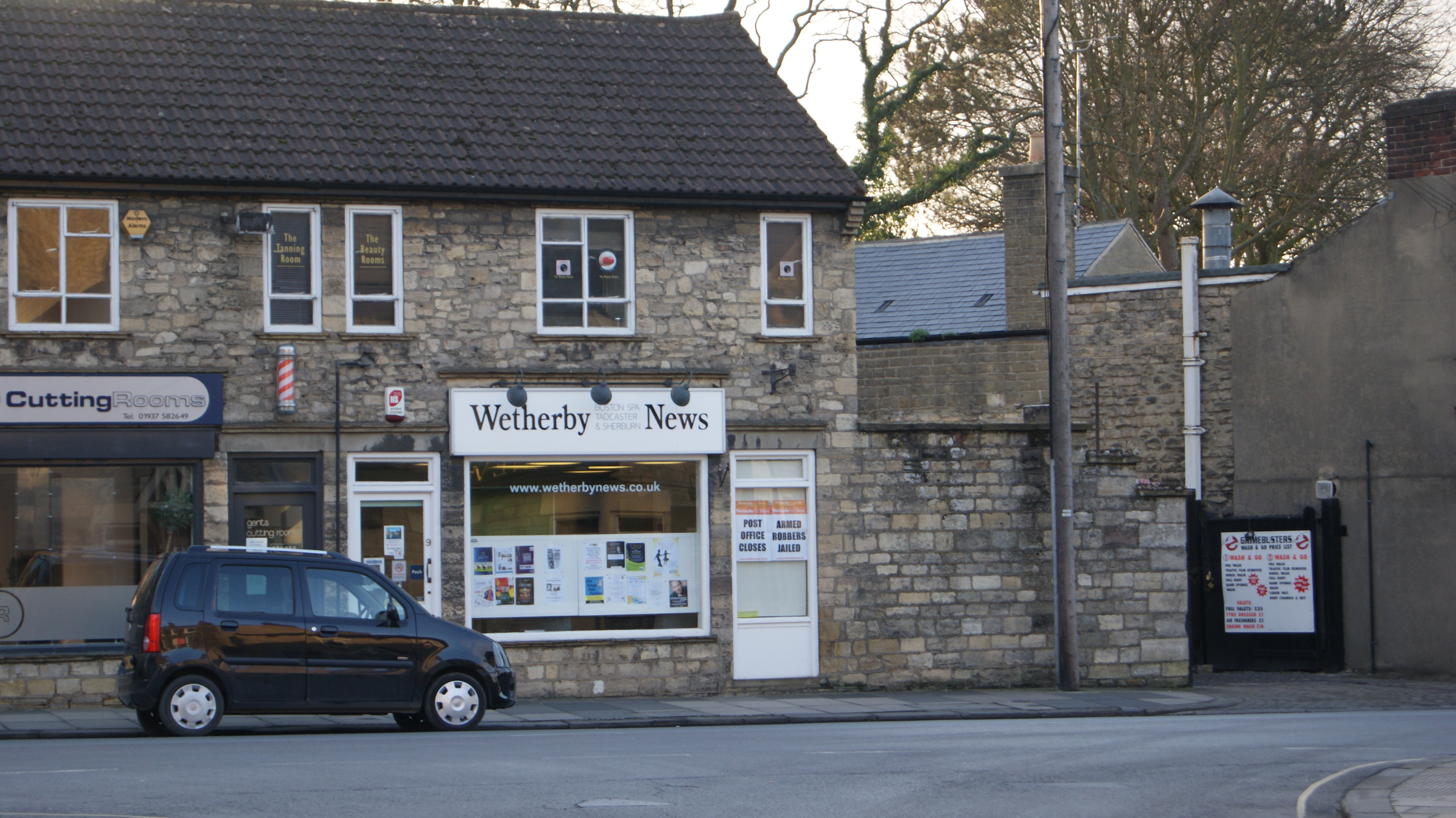
The Wetherby News offices on Westgate

The Wetherby News has a partnership with Tempo FM with whom it provides a weekly news review every Friday morning.

In 2012 the Wetherby News became a tabloid and moved its publications from a Friday to a Thursday.
