= Clifford, West Yorkshire =

Village in West Yorkshire, England

Coordinates: 53.8928°N 1.3515°W

Clifford
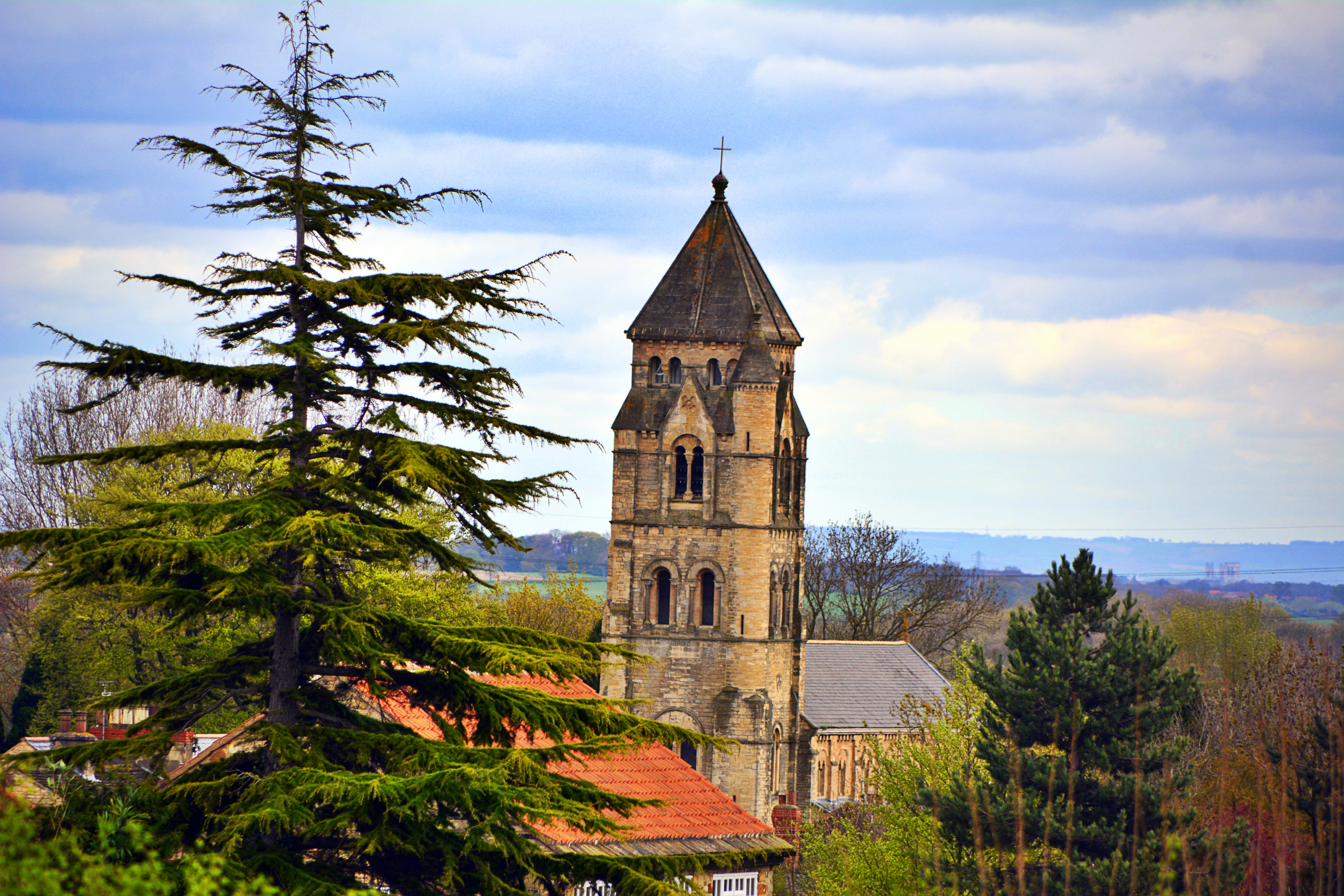
- St. Edward King and Confessor Catholic Church

- Location within West Yorkshire
- Population: 1,662 (2011 census)
  - London: 190
- Metropolitan borough: City of Leeds
- Metropolitan county: West Yorkshire
- Region: Yorkshire and the Humber
- Country: England
- Sovereign state: United Kingdom
- Post town: WETHERBY
- Postcode district: LS23
- Dialling code: 01937
- Police: West Yorkshire
- Fire: West Yorkshire
- Ambulance: Yorkshire
- UK Parliament: Elmet

Clifford is a village and civil parish in West Yorkshire, England. The population of the civil parish at the 2011 Census was 1,662. The village is 3 miles (4.8 km) south of Wetherby. Many of the older buildings are built of magnesian limestone.

== Etymology ==
The name Clifford is first attested in the Domesday Book of 1086. It comes from the Old English words clif ('cliff, bank') and ford ('ford'), thus meaning 'ford at the bank or cliff'. This perhaps referred to the crossing of the River Wharfe at Boston Spa, which was then within the manor.

== History ==
According to the Domesday Book, in 1086, Ligulf held the manor, which comprised six carucates with four ploughs.

In the Middle Ages Clifford was a subordinate settlement to Bramham, and had no parish church or manor house. A Wesleyan chapel was built some time before 1838, and the three churches soon after. The Anglican St Luke's Church was built in 1840.

Clifford was originally a farming community, but in 1831, corn mills powered by Bramham Beck on Old Mill Lane, were transformed into flax mills, making patent yarn and shoe thread. The mills were owned by the Grimston Brothers. At its height, the business employed about 300 workers, some of them Irish immigrants, and many of whom lived in the stone terraced cottages in the village.

== Governance ==
Clifford was a township in the old parish of Bramham, in the upper-division of the wapentake of Barkston Ash, in the West Riding of Yorkshire. It became a separate civil parish in 1866 as Clifford with Boston, which was split into the civil parishes of Clifford and Boston Spa in 1896.

== Geography ==
Clifford is a rural village, with a conservation area at its centre. It has a mix of buildings from traditional magnesian limestone cottages to modern family housing. All construction within the conservation area must use local limestone. Green Belt land separates the village from Bramham and Boston Spa. Limestone for building was quarried locally. Clifford is situated in the British county of West Yorkshire, a short distance from the North Yorkshire border and district of Selby. The nearest train station to the village is Ulleskelf, a small village in the district of Selby. The village has a mix of historical buildings and modern new housing estates. The nearest city is Leeds, with the city of York and the town of Harrogate also located nearby.

The A1(M) motorway is just over one mile (1.6 km) to the west. Bus services coordinated by West Yorkshire Passenger Transport Executive go to Tadcaster, Leeds, Harrogate, Wetherby and Wakefield. The roads around the village lead to Boston Spa, Bramham and Toulston, as well as the nearby towns of Wetherby and Tadcaster.

== Religion ==
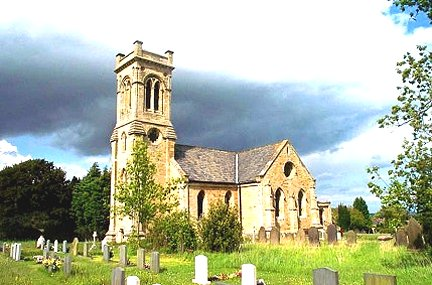
St Luke's C of E church

There are three churches in Clifford. The Anglican church dedicated to St Luke on high ground at the western end of the village is built in the Gothic style of architecture and was consecrated by the Archbishop of York in 1842. The church cost £1200 raised by subscription and the site was donated by George Lane-Fox. The Wesleyan Methodists built a chapel, and the Roman Catholics built St Edward King and Confessor Catholic Church to serve the population of Irish workers that came to work in Grimstons' flax mill established in the village in 1831. The Grimston, Clifford and Vavasour families contributed to the cost of building the church.

== Economy ==
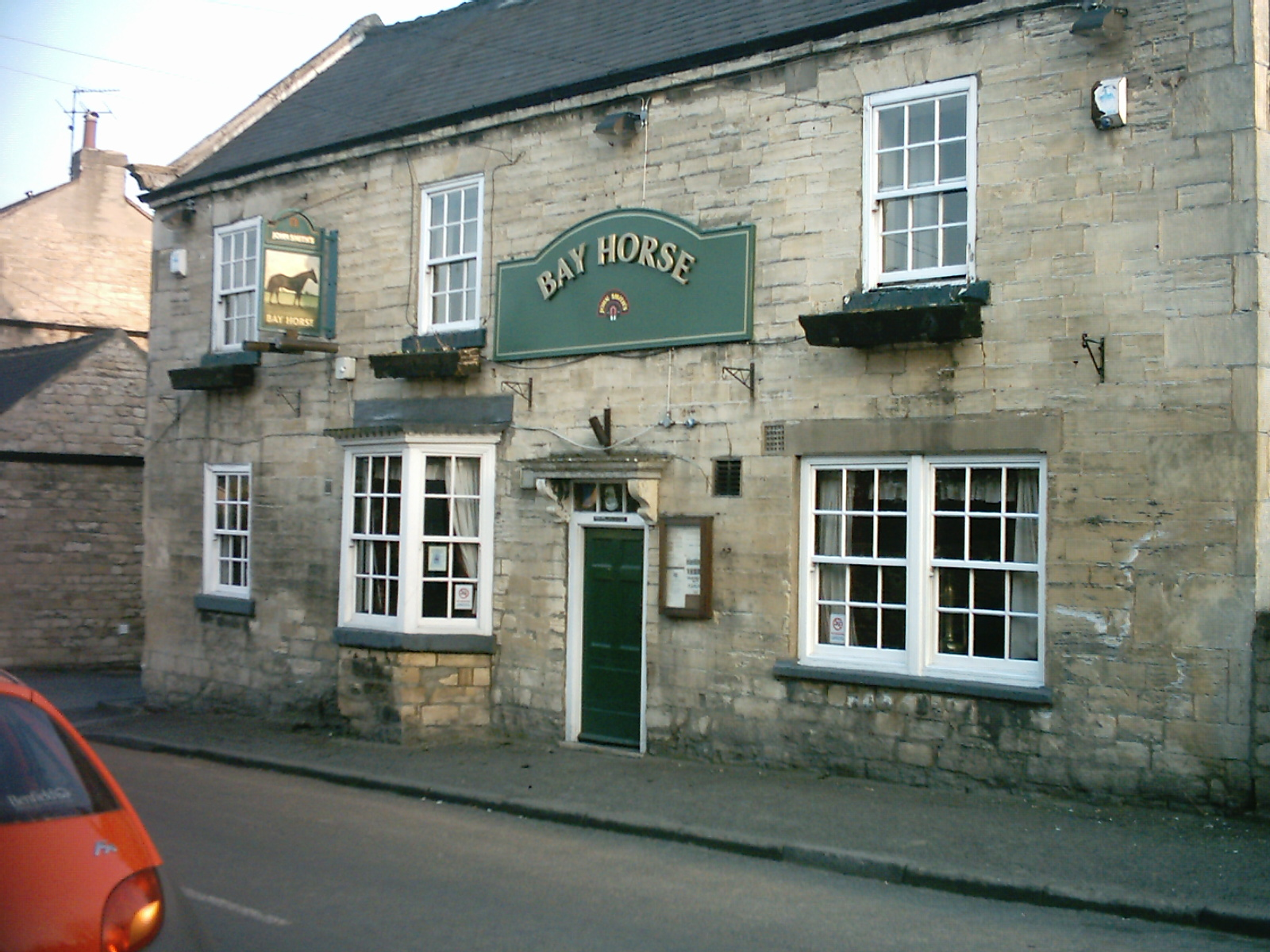
The Bay Horse

Clifford has two public houses (The Albion and The Old Star) and a fish and chip shop (Clifford Fisheries). There were no other shops or businesses in 2009 as the post office had been converted into houses.

=== Public houses ===
The Old Star is a historic multi room pub owned and operated by Samuel Smith Old Brewery. The Albion is situated on the edge of the village is run under lease from Enterprise Inns.

== Education ==
There are three schools serving the Clifford parish: Bramham Primary School, St. John's School for the Deaf and Boston Spa School.

== Culture ==
The Village Hall is a small venue for concerts and plays. Clifford's Champion Beer Festival was first held in June 2010 and has since become a popular annual event. The village hall holds drama groups, history 'clubs' and also walks around the local area as well as the surrounding country.

Clifford has a monthly magazine, The Outlook, that is delivered free to every resident by the committee.
