= Magnesian Limestone =

Suite of carbonate rocks in England

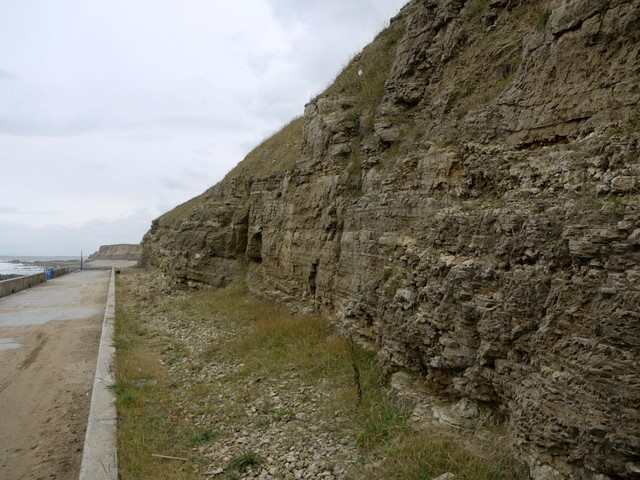
The cliffs of Magnesian Limestone, Grangetown promenade

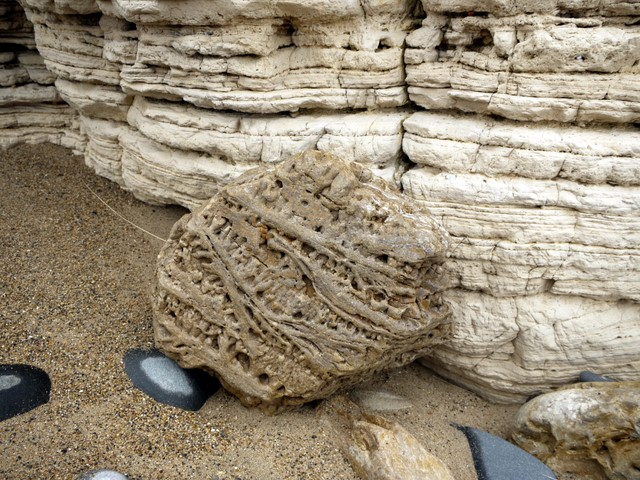
Cellular patterns in a boulder of Magnesian Limestone

The Magnesian Limestone is a suite of carbonate rocks in north-east England dating from the Permian period. The outcrop stretches from Nottingham northwards through Yorkshire and into County Durham where it is exposed along the coast between Hartlepool and South Shields. The term has now been discontinued in formal use though it appears widely in popular and scientific literature on the geology of northern England.

The Magnesian Limestone is now incorporated within the Zechstein Group. In the southern part of its outcrop, the former 'Lower Magnesian Limestone' is now referred to as the 'Cadeby Formation'. Overlying this it is the 'Edlington Formation' (formerly the 'Middle Permian Marl') and above this the Brotherton Formation (formerly the 'Upper Magnesian Limestone'). In the north, the Lower Magnesian Limestone is now referred to as the Raisby Formation and the middle Magnesian Limestone as the Ford Formation. The Upper Magnesian Limestone is replaced by the Roker Formation (in its lower part) and the Seaham Formation (in its upper part) with the Edlington formation between them, though in the Durham area this last is replaced by the Fordham Evaporite Formation and the Seaham Residue.

Much of the Magnesian Limestone is dolomite, i.e. calcium magnesium carbonate, and has been for many years the main source of dolomite-rock in Britain. It is used in connection with the production of refractory bricks but also for aggregate for road-building and other construction purposes. It is also used in the production of agricultural lime. This type of limestone was used for statues in antiquity because of its resistance to acid. Many pieces of dolomite were found in the ruins of Rome, though they are thought to have been brought from Magnesia in Greece.
