= Thorp Arch (disambiguation) =

Thorp Arch is a village near Wetherby in West Yorkshire, England.

Thorp Arch may also refer to:

- Thorp Arch (training ground), the location of the academy and training pitches of Leeds United A.F.C.
- Thorp Arch railway station
- ROF Thorp Arch, a former World War II Royal Ordnance Factory near the village of Thorp Arch
- Thorp Arch Trading Estate, an industrial estate on the site of ROF Thorp Arch
