= All Saints' Church, Bramham =

Coordinates: 53°52′54.2″N 1°21′06.6″W

All Saints'
- All Saints' Church
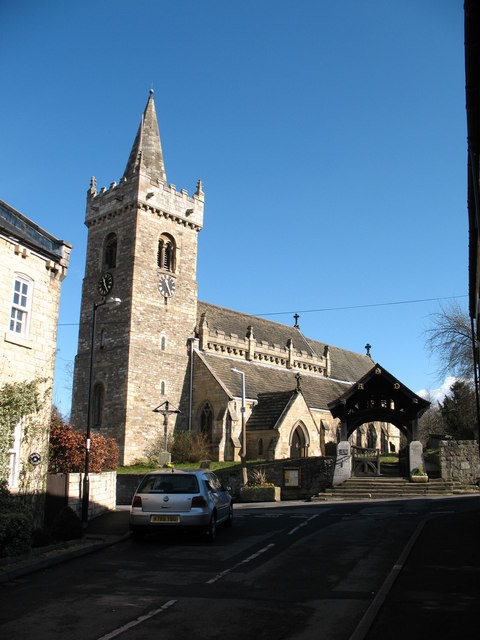
- All Saints'
- OS grid reference: SE 42715 43036
- Location: Bramham, West Yorkshire
- Country: England
- Denomination: Church of England
- Website: https://bramhambenefice.org/

History
- Status: Parish Church

Architecture
- Heritage designation: Grade II listed building
- Style: Medieval

Specifications
- Materials: Magnesian limestone with slate roof

Administration
- Province: York
- Diocese: Diocese of York
- Archdeaconry: York
- Deanery: New Ainsty
- Parish: Bramham

All Saints' Church in Bramham, West Yorkshire, England is an active Anglican parish church and Grade II* listed building in the Deanery of New Ainsty, the Archdeaconry of York and the Diocese of York. It is part of The Bramham Benefice, a group of four churches serving villages to the east of Wetherby in the LS23 postcode area. The other churches are St Mary's Church, Boston Spa, All Saints' Church, Thorp Arch, and St Peter's Church, Walton. The current Priest in Charge is the Reverend Nicholas J. Morgan, MA.

== History ==
The church originally dates from the 12th and 13th centuries; the earliest known parts were built around 1150. It was altered in the 19th and 20th centuries. The church contains various monuments to the Fox-Lane family of Bramham Park, most notably George (1697–1773).

== Architectural style ==
The church is built of magnesian limestone and has a pitched slate roof. The church has a tower to its western side with a spire atop. The tower has three offset stages, a round-headed window and clocks on the southern, northern and western face. The church has an ornate lychgate on the southern side of its boundaries.

== See also ==
- List of places of worship in the City of Leeds
- Grade II* listed buildings in Leeds
- Listed buildings in Bramham cum Oglethorpe
