= Robert Blackburn (aviation pioneer) =

English aviation pioneer (1885–1955)

- Born: March 26, 1885; Kirkstall, Leeds, Yorkshire, England
- Died: September 10, 1955; Devon, England
- Education: Leeds Modern School; University of Leeds (Engineering)
- Occupations: Aviation pioneer, aircraft designer and manufacturer
- Known for: Founder of Blackburn Aircraft
- Notable work: First monoplane (1909); Blackburn Aeroplane Company (founded 1911); Blackburn Aeroplane & Motor Company (1916); North Sea Aerial Navigation Company (1919)
- Spouses: Jessy Blackburn (m. 1914, div. 1936); Phyllis Margaret Kirton (m. 9 April 1936)
- Children: Three sons and two daughters (with Jessy); Two daughters (with Phyllis)
- Parent(s): George William Blackburn; Kate Naylor
- Awards: OBE; FRAeS

Robert Blackburn, OBE, FRAeS (26 March 1885 – 10 September 1955) was an English aviation pioneer and the founder of Blackburn Aircraft.

== Early life and education ==
Blackburn was born in Kirkstall, Leeds, Yorkshire, England to Kate (née Naylor) and George William Blackburn, an engineer and works manager of William Green & Sons, lawnmower and steamroller manufacturers. He was the eldest of three brothers and attended Leeds Modern School and graduated in engineering at the University of Leeds, and built his first aircraft, a monoplane, in 1909. He made his first short flight on the sandy beach between Saltburn and Marske in the spring of 1909. The aircraft was badly damaged in 1910 when he attempted to make a turn.

== Career ==
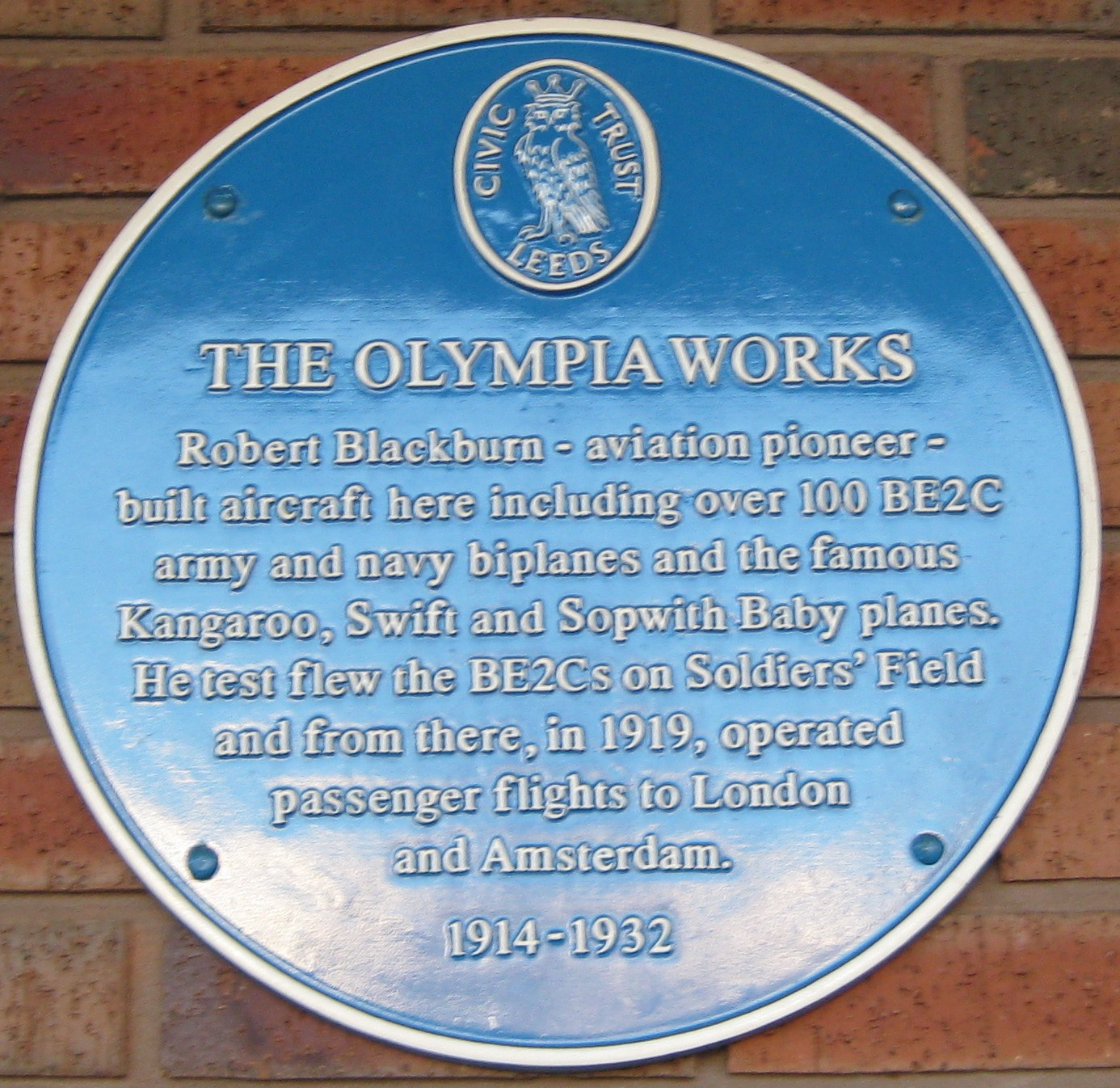
Plaque at what is now Tesco, Roundhay Road, Leeds. 53.82323°N 1.5108°W

He moved to Filey and built a second monoplane which established his reputation as an aviation pioneer and in 1911 founded the Blackburn Aeroplane Company. In 1914 he married Tryphena Jessica Thompson, known as Jessy Blackburn and with her help and inheritance created the Blackburn Aeroplane & Motor Company, establishing it in a new factory at Brough, East Riding of Yorkshire in 1916.

He also opened a factory at Roundhay, Leeds in 1914, which was forced to shut down in 1920 after the closure of Roundhay Aerodrome. He introduced the first scheduled air service in Great Britain, offering half-hourly flights between Leeds and Bradford. In 1919 he set up the North Sea Aerial Navigation Company, using surplus World War I aeroplanes, which operated a regular passenger service between Leeds and Hounslow, London as well as cargo flights between cities, including Leeds and Amsterdam. In 1917 Blackburn and Jessy purchased Bowcliffe Hall at Bramham, near Wetherby as their home. Blackburn hoped to one day operate an airline that went from Cape Town, South Africa to Cairo, Egypt. In the 1930s he lived in Natal, South Africa and in the towns of Bulawayo and Victoria Falls in what has since become Zimbabwe.

He was the founder of the Scarcroft golf club. In 1950 he retired, leaving Bowcliffe Hall and moving to Devon. On his death in Devon in 1955 the Blackburn company's production facilities became part of Hawker Siddeley.

== Personal life ==
Jessy and Robert Blackburn had three sons and two daughters. They divorced in 1936. He married Phyllis Margaret Kirton in the same year and they had two daughters.

== Commemoration ==
The Robert Blackburn building at University of Hull commemorates him.
