= Bramham, West Yorkshire =

Village in West Yorkshire, England

Coordinates: 53.8800°N 1.3516°W

Bramham
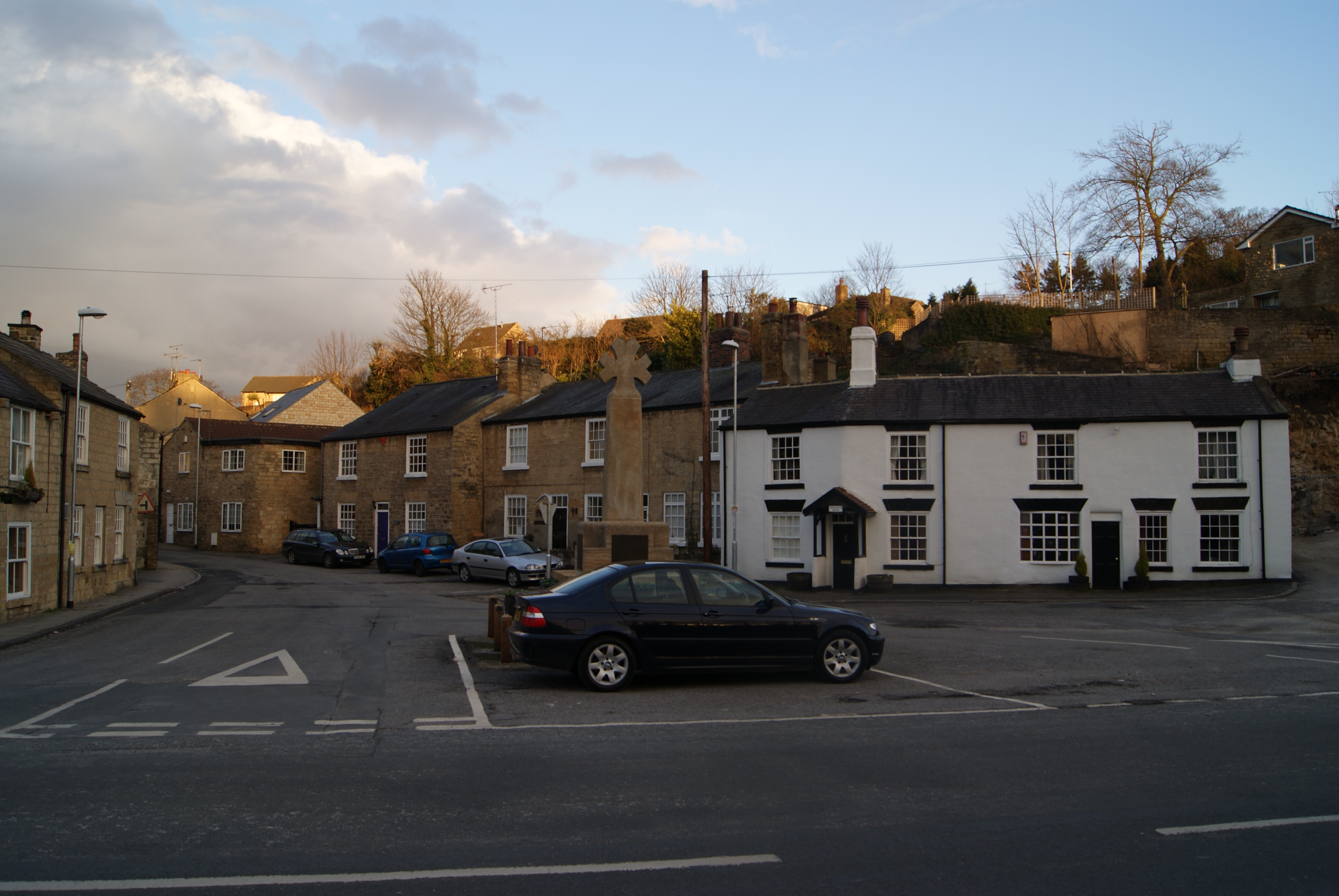
- Low Way

- Location within West Yorkshire
- Population: 1,650
- OS grid reference: SE425430
  - London: 170 mi (270 km) SSE
- Civil parish: Bramham cum Oglethorpe
- Metropolitan borough: City of Leeds
- Metropolitan county: West Yorkshire
- Region: Yorkshire and the Humber
- Country: England
- Sovereign state: United Kingdom
- Post town: WETHERBY
- Postcode district: LS23
- Dialling code: 01937
- Police: West Yorkshire
- Fire: West Yorkshire
- Ambulance: Yorkshire
- UK Parliament: Elmet and Rothwell

Bramham is a village in the civil parish of Bramham cum Oglethorpe in the City of Leeds metropolitan borough, West Yorkshire, England.

It sits in the Wetherby ward of Leeds City Council and Elmet and Rothwell parliamentary constituency.

== Overview ==
According to the 2001 census the parish had a population of 1,715, which had fallen to 1,650 by the time of the 2011 census. Bramham is located 3 miles (5 km) south of Wetherby, midway between Leeds and York and about 12 miles (19 km) south of Harrogate in the so-called Golden Triangle. Bramham is a part of the Wetherby Ward of Leeds Metropolitan Council and is at the north-eastern edge of West Yorkshire where it borders North Yorkshire at Tadcaster, 4 miles (6.4 km) away. Bramham was in the Elmet constituency until the 2010 general election when it became part of the newly created Elmet and Rothwell constituency and the local Conservative M.P. is Alec Shelbrooke.

Bramham Park (at SE410417), 2 miles (3 km) to the south-west of the village, is home to the Leeds Festival, an annual music and arts festival, which is held over the August Bank Holiday weekend each year.

== Etymology ==
The name Bramham is first attested in the Domesday Book in the forms Bramha, Brameha, and Braham. It comes from the Old English words brōm ('broom') and hām ('village, homestead'), and thus once meant 'homestead characterised by broom'.

== History ==
Bramham is at the crossroads of the east-west Roman road from York through Tadcaster to Ilkley and the north-south Great North Road, now the A1 road, giving it a history that goes back to the Romans.

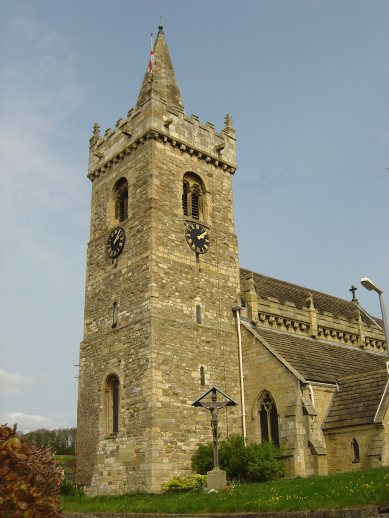
All Saints' Church, which dates back to Norman times.

The Old English place name elements -ham and -ingaham are characteristic of the earliest English-speaking settlements in England, associated with the growth of Anglo-Saxon culture in post-Roman Britain. Running north south and following approximately, the Magnesian Limestone belt, a line of -ingaham (Collingham "homestead of Cola's folk") and -ham (Bramham "homestead amongst the broom") names can be identified, which also coincide with the distribution of seventh-century burials.

Bramham is recorded in the Domesday Book as the Manor of Bramham and the Holder in 1066 was Ligulfr. The amount of land to be taxed (geld) was 12 carucates and there were eight ploughs in the village. By 1086, Bramham was held by Nigel from Count Robert of Mortain and Demesne ploughs (for lord's needs) were three. There were 15 villeins or tenant farmers holding a total of 5.5 ploughs between them. An estimate of the total population of Bramham in 1086 was 68. Bramham's value in 1066 was 160 shillings but only 50 shillings in 1086 after the Harrying of the North, indicating quite a severe levels of destruction. Bramham was a mill site in 1086. In comparison, Wetherby had a population of 41 and was valued at only 20 shillings in both 1066 and 1086.

The oldest part of All Saints Parish Church in Bramham was built in about 1150 by the Normans. The church consists of nave, aisles, and chancel, with tower and short spire; and has a fine pointed doorway. The churchyard is oval in shape and therefore Anglian in origin.

Older houses in the centre of the village are constructed of Magnesian Limestone quarried in the parish. Stone from Bramham was used for the pendants and hanging ornaments on the vaults and ceilings of York Minster, and in records of the building of the Minster, Bramham stone is specially referred to as being used for this purpose. The Bramham limestone was transported to York by water from Tadcaster or Cawood.

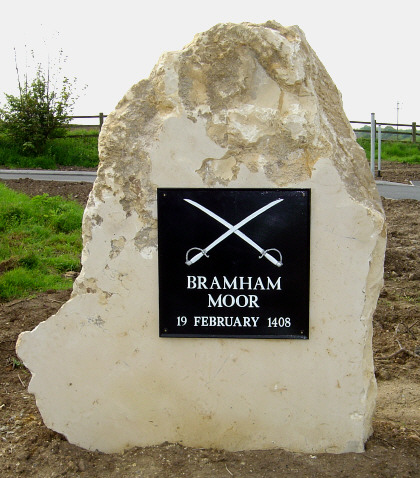
Memorial Stone at the site of the Battle of Bramham Moor, which took place in 1408.

The Battle of Bramham Moor was fought, in the snow, on 19 February 1408. Henry Percy, 1st Earl of Northumberland, who with other nobles had rebelled against King Henry IV, was met here by Sir Thomas Rokeby; the rebels were cut to pieces and Percy was killed, his head, with its silver locks, being carried off and set on a stake on London Bridge.

There is a memorial stone marking where the Earl of Northumberland fell and was killed at Blackfen Wood, Bramham, but the stone was moved from the actual site of the battle some years ago. A plaque erected to denote the significance of the stone has been vandalised and nowadays is difficult to find or decipher. In 2008, to commemorate the 600th anniversary of the battle, an information board and a two-sided limestone memorial stone bearing "Bramham" and "Site of Battle" signs was erected on Paradise Way, the new local access road, which crosses the battlefield site.

English Civil War soldiers who died during the Battle of Marston Moor in 1644, a few miles to the north-east, are buried in the churchyard at Bramham. Records show that three soldiers rest there: Samuell Allan, Robert Johnson and Thomas Mirole. Prior to the battle, Cromwell is reputed to have trained his Ironsides on Bramham Moor, and to have recruited local young farmers whose riding skills made them ideal cavalry soldiers.

By 1686, Bramham was a staging post on the London to Edinburgh coaching route and had a population of 291, which was higher than that of Wetherby at only 279. In 1801, the population of Bramham was around 800, reaching 1,300 by 1861. However, a significant decline led to the population falling back to 950 in 1901. The population has gradually been increasing since then, although the 1861 peak was only overtaken in 1981. By 2001, the village had a population of about 1,750, about a quarter of whom were under the age of 19 and well over half (62%) were under the age of 44, making it a village of young people. There were 674 households, a growth of 20% on the 1991 census.

Arthur Mee's The King's England: Yorkshire West Riding, first printed in 1941, describes Bramham:

The Great North Road and a stream flowing to the River Wharfe are crossed by one of many Roman roads hereabouts. It has a fine bridge, an imposing peace memorial, an old windmill looking down, and houses great and small in a lovely green setting. South of the village, where the hillside road is bowered with stately beeches, are four fine houses not far apart; Bramham House, Bramham Lodge, Bramham Biggin (which began as a chantry to Nostell Priory), and Bramham Hall, a house in classic style with an entrance crowned by a pediment on six pillars. Shading its beautiful gardens are cedars, beeches, chestnuts, and ancient yews; and a great whitebeam here is said to be the biggest in England. Off the Roman road running through rich woodland west of the village is Hope Hall, where Sir Thomas Fairfax lived; it was the kennels of the Bramham Moor Hunt when we called.

During the First World War there was an aerodrome at Bramham Moor at Headley Bar, which opened on 18 March 1916. The aerodrome was set in 198 acres (0.80 km^{2}) of land of which 40 acres (160,000 m^{2}) was occupied by station buildings. Initially, "B" and "C" flights, 33 Squadron of the Royal Flying Corps were based at the new aerodrome with "A" flight detached to nearby York Racecourse. Following a bombing raid on York on 2 May 1916 by Zeppelin airships, the airfield on York Racecourse was closed, and 33 Squadron at RFC Bramham Moor became responsible for the air defence of Leeds, Sheffield and York against further Zeppelin attack. 33 Squadron's aircraft were the RAF BE 2c and BE 2d biplanes, these later being replaced by the much better FE 2b biplane. In early 1918, after the RAF was formed, RFC Bramham Moor became known as RAF Tadcaster. In July 1918, a group of American pilots and ground staff were based at Bramham Moor for training. When the USA had entered the First World War in 1917, their pilots had gone straight into action with a lack of combat experience and had suffered heavy losses. It was subsequently decided that all American pilots should pass through the British training schools such as the one at Bramham. After the First World War, with a reduced need for warplanes, the aerodrome was closed down in December 1919. One large hangar remains, as a listed building, among the barns of Headley Hall Farm. During the Second World War, vehicles were left on the old grassed areas, to deter the site being used as a landing ground in the event of an invasion.

For many years, the village had a rural emphasis although as the Great North Road grew in importance, the number of coaching inns and stables increased to service the passing trade. Over the years, a significant amount of employment has been provided by the local estates, particularly Bramham Park and the other grand houses in the village. In the late 20th century there was a decline in employment in agriculture that coincided with the growth of the village as home to a significant number of commuters. As a result, the village has become increasingly diverse in nature. A large part of the village is included in a conservation area and all the land outside the present built area is currently designated green belt.

The army officer, ethnologist and anthropologist General Augustus Pitt Rivers was born in Bramham cum Oglethorpe on 14 April 1827.

== Present-day ==
=== Description ===
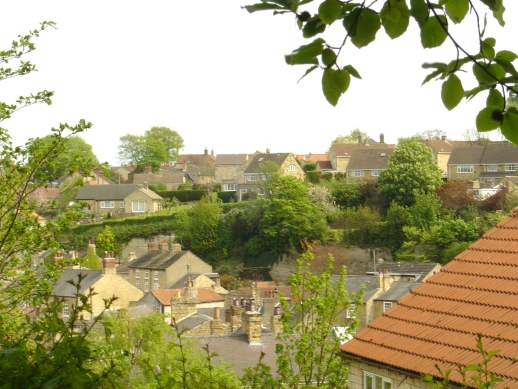
Part of Bramham as viewed from the western outskirts of the village near the A1.

The annual report by the chairman of the Parish Council in 2004 states:

Bramham is a village of churches and farms and pubs and clubs; a village with a stately home with formal gardens, and allotments; a village with florists, doctors, dentists, joiners, photographers, roofers, oil merchants, timber merchants and wine merchants; a village that puts on roller discos, plays, farces, pantomimes, pop concerts, rock stars from the USA and even the odd silent auction. Not even that list is complete as there are also accountants, engineers, solicitors, plumbers, teachers, plasterers, bankers, IT consultants, electricians and many more. Nevertheless, apart from the offices located at Bowcliffe Hall, there are few businesses offering employment within the Parish.

=== Education ===
Bramham Primary School, just outside the parish boundary, provides the village's primary education, mainly feeding Boston Spa Comprehensive School.

=== Healthcare ===
Bramham's Medical Centre is situated on Clifford Road, near the centre of the village. Hospital treatment is usually provided by hospitals in Leeds or Harrogate. Bramham has an ambulance station, however Yorkshire Ambulance have considered moving the station to Wetherby, since the upgrade to the A1(M) has meant the Bramham site no longer has efficient access to the motorway.

=== Community activities ===
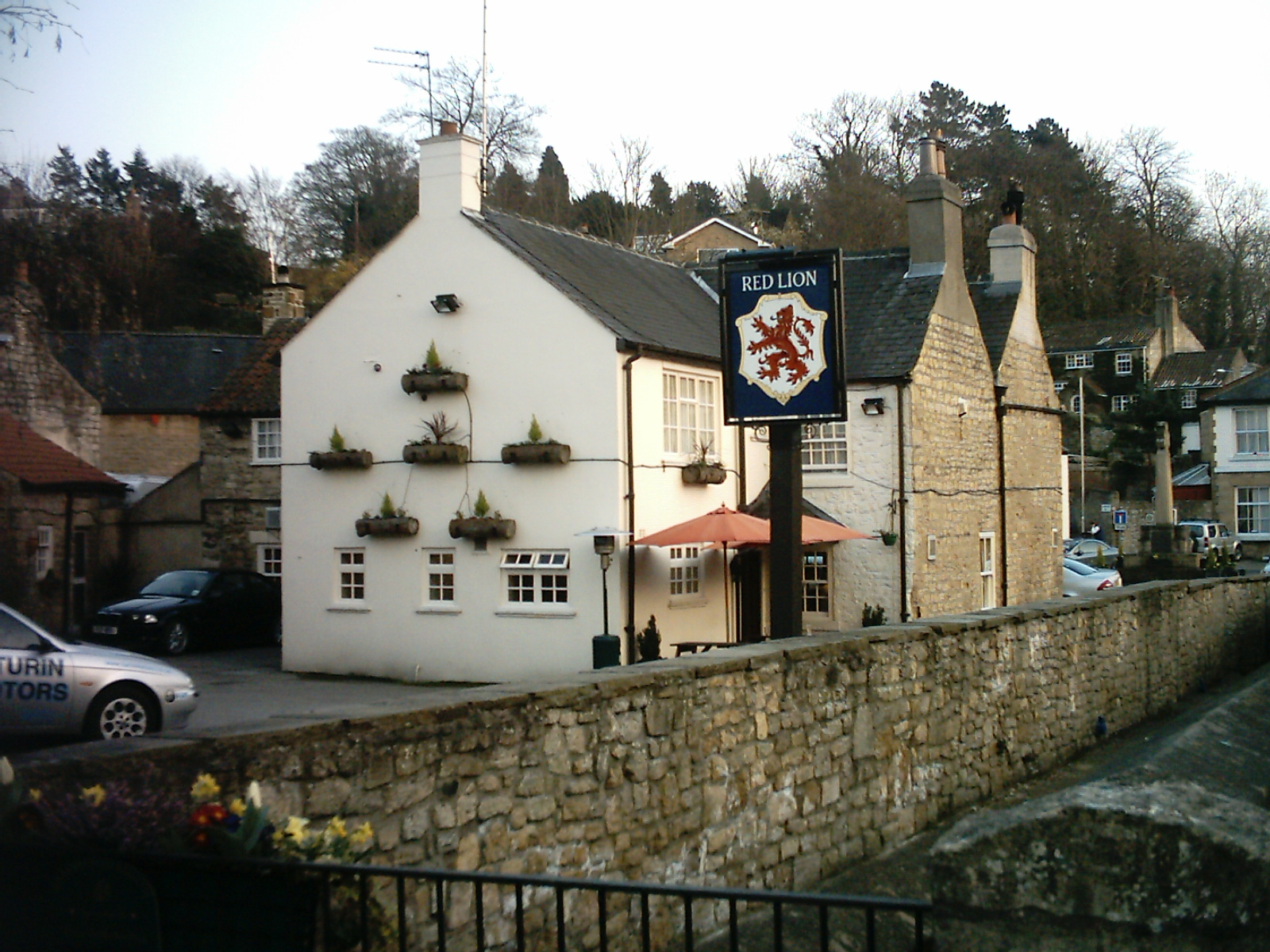
The Red Lion

Community-based activities take place in Bramham Village Hall, and include groups and classes for drama, dance and fitness, Guides and Brownies, youth, and ramblers, and provides for church functions, senior citizens, parties, Bramham in Bloom, the NSPCC, and the Yorkshire Countrywomen's Association. Entertainment has included bands from the US and Sweden, comedian Dominic Holland, an evening with Indian musicians, and New Year's Eve parties.

Bramham Community Action Group was established in 2005 and is implementing elements of a Parish Plan. In 2006 the group organised the Bramham Gala, which was held on the playing fields on Aberford Road. This was the first time the event has been held for over 20 years. Bramham Gala took place again in June 2007 and is now scheduled as a yearly event.

Since 2003 the Leeds Music Festival has been held on the three days of the August Bank Holiday weekend in the grounds of Bramham Park. Under an agreement between Leeds City Council, the Parish Council, the promoter (Festival Republic), and the Bramham Park Estate. A number of free tickets are available to residents of the parish who make a financial contribution to the Bramham Community Fund, and to residents of Bardsey and Clifford. Festival Republic, formerly Mean Fiddler, specified that the Community Fund should be used to benefit the residents of the village, and Bramham's local community groups. The Fund has made grants of over £500,000 reports the Secretary of the Fund (December 2024)

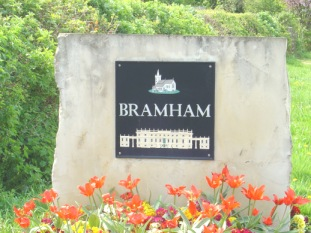
Village signpost along Toulston Lane on the way to Tadcaster.

=== Sport ===
Bramham Football Club was founded in 1907, and plays home games at Freely Lane. It has two teams in the Harrogate and District League. The club reformed in 2005, and won the Barkston Ash Cup in 2005 and the Harrogate and District League Division One title in 2006, and again in 2007. Bramham FC also has Junior and Girls football teams.

Bramham and Clifford Cricket Club has one team in the local Wetherby and District League (division 4) and a Thursday evening team in the Whixley Evening League. It plays at Rhodes Lane in nearby Clifford village.

The Bramham Horse Trials are held at Bramham Park every June and form one of the UK's leading 3-day horse riding events, attracting international competitors. In 2006, over 35,000 visitors attended the event. Bramham International Horse Trials was voted the best event in the British Equestrian Trade Awards in February 2006.

== Bramham College ==
Bramham College was a public school opened in January 1843 when Dr. Benjamin Haigh leased Bramham Biggin plus 130 acres (0.53 km^{2}) of parks and gardens. The college was extended to include a hall, theatre, gymnasium and cloisters, and a Grecian-style refectory with a glass dome. The college gained a good reputation and during its short life and attracted the sons of leading Yorkshire families. It closed after falling into decline following a severe epidemic of cholera in 1869. Several pupils died and are buried next to their headmaster under the yew tree at the eastern end of Bramham churchyard. Former pupils of Bramham College formed Bradford Football Club in 1863, and in 1880 joined Bradford Cricket Club at Bradford Park Avenue.

== Bramham Moor Hunt ==
The Bramham Moor Hunt was founded in the 1740s by George Fox Lane, the son-in-law of Robert Benson, 1st Baron Bingley (1676–1731) who had built Bramham Park in the late 17th century. George Fox Lane was Member of Parliament for York from 1742 to 1761 and was created Lord Bingley in 1762.

In 2002, the Bramham Moor Hunt merged with the Badsworth Hunt to become the Badsworth and Bramham Moor Hunt. The Bramham fox hounds, which, for many years, had been kennelled at Hope Hall, Bramham moved to Thorpe Audlin, near Pontefract. The Badsworth and Bramham Moor Hunt is active in areas that the two separate hunts covered previously.

During the Second World War, two Hunt-class destroyers of the Royal Navy were named after the two hunts; HMS Badsworth and HMS Bramham respectively.

A LNER Class D49 locomotive, "The Bramham Moor", was built in April 1932 by the London & North Eastern Railway's Darlington Works as number 201 (later British Railways 62736), typically hauling seven to ten coach trains on moderate length (50–100 mile) journeys in the north-east of England and remained in service until June 1958 when it was scrapped.

== TV ==
Between 1979 and 1986, Bramham with fellow nearby Luddenden was used as filming locations for external scenes in the 1980s ITV Yorkshire Television situation comedy series In Loving Memory, starring Dame Thora Hird and Christopher Beeny.

== See also ==
- Listed buildings in Bramham cum Oglethorpe
