= Jessy Blackburn =

British aviation pioneer (1894–1995)

- Born: Tryphena Jessica Thompson; April 20, 1894; Cradley, Worcestershire, England
- Died: May 14, 1995 (aged 101); Eastbourne, East Sussex, England
- Other names: Jessica Noakes; Jessica Barton
- Known for: Aviation pioneer
- Spouses: Robert Blackburn (m. 1914; div. 1936); Jack Noakes (m. 1941, divorced); Stanley Barton (m. 1953, divorced)
- Children: 5

Tryphena Jessica "Jessy" Blackburn (née Thompson; formerly Noakes and Barton; 20 April 1894 – 14 May 1995) was a British aviation pioneer and one of the first women to fly a British monoplane.

== Biography ==
Born on 20 April 1894, Cradley, Worcestershire, England she was left an orphan while young. Her father, Wesley Thompson, was a doctor. He and his wife Catherline died when Blackburn was three. She was raised by her older brother Clarence and later by her sister Eugenie. Blackburn was sent to Ecole d'Etrangers in Brussels in 1910. She met her husband, the Yorkshire engineer Robert Blackburn, in 1912 and he introduced her to his love of aviation. The couple married in 1914.

The Blackburns founded Blackburn Aircraft using her inheritance. Jessy became an important asset in the sales and marketing of the company. She hosted RAF officials, politicians, media and aviation pioneers in their homes in Leeds and in Bowcliffe Hall, in Bramham. Blackburn learned to fly in Roundhay Park in Leeds, the test location for the company's new aircraft. She attended most of the major flying events of the next twenty years. Blackburn flew in the 1922 and 1928 King's Cup Air Races.

== Personal life ==
Blackburn had three sons and two daughters. Her youngest, Peter, spent two years in Switzerland with tuberculosis. Another son, Rob, was killed in an accident in 1935 when he was hit by a car while riding his bike. Her marriage ended the following year. Blackburn married again in 1941 to Group Captain Jack Noakes but again the marriage ended in divorce. She went on to marry Stanley Barton in 1953. Again this marriage did not last. Blackburn returned each time to using her first married name.

She celebrated her 100th birthday in the Grand Hotel in Eastbourne and died in 1995, aged 101.
