= Thorp Arch railway station =

Disused railway station in West Yorkshire, England

Thorp Arch
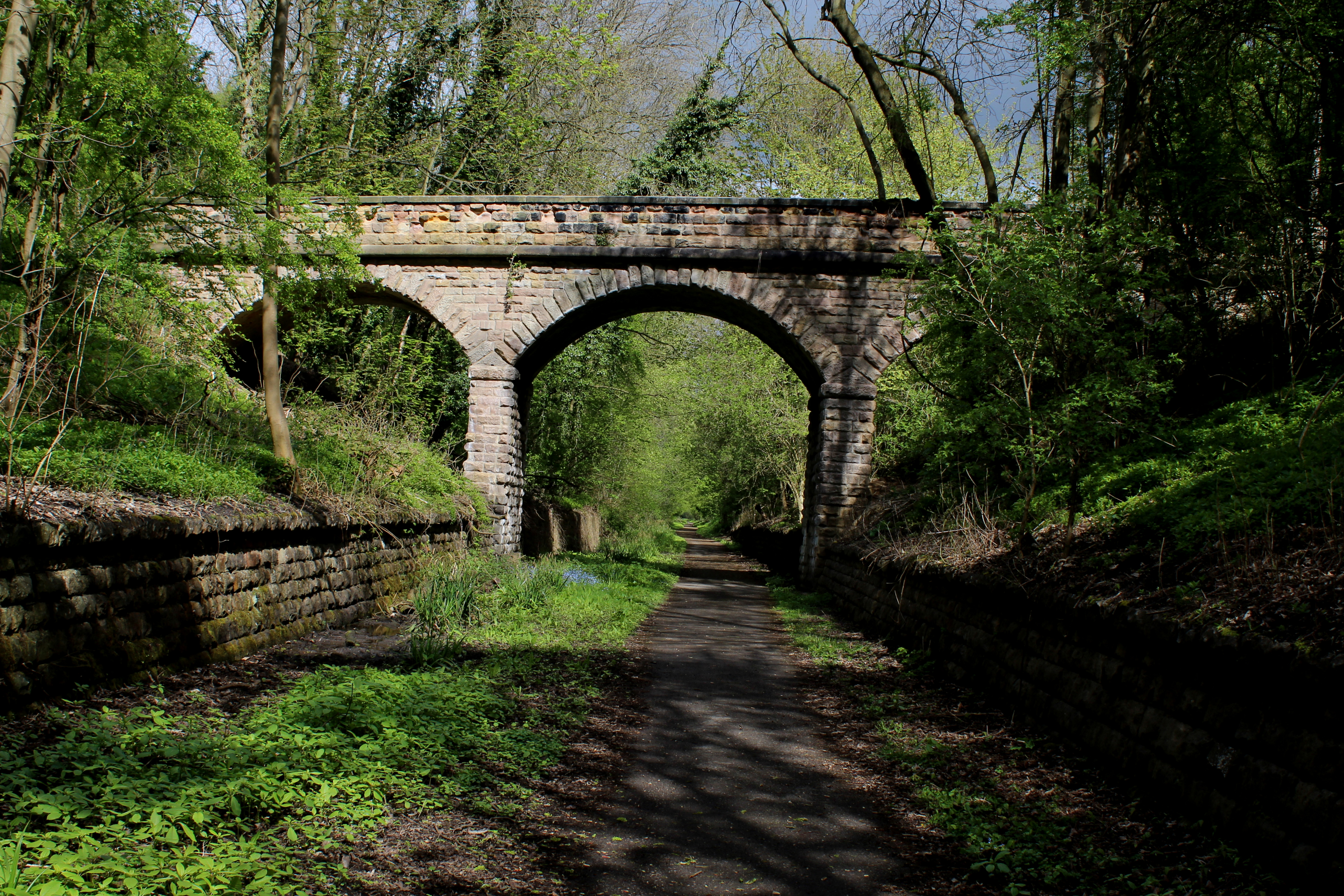
- Cutting and overbridge at northern end of former station, 2017

General information
- Location: Thorp Arch, City of Leeds; England
- Coordinates: 53.9129°N 1.3336°W
- Grid reference: SE437465
- Platforms: 2

Other information
- Status: Disused

History
- Original company: York and North Midland Railway until 1854
- Pre-grouping: North Eastern Railway 1854-1923
- Post-grouping: LNER 1923-1948, BR (N.E region) 1948 to closure

Key dates
- 10 August 1847: Opened as Thorp Arch (Boston Spa)
- 12 June 1961: Renamed Thorp Arch
- 6 January 1964: Closed to passengers
- 10 August 1964: Closed
Location

Thorp Arch railway station (before 12 June 1961 called Thorp Arch (Boston Spa)) was a station in the parish of Wetherby, West Yorkshire, on the Harrogate–Church Fenton line. It opened on 10 August 1847 and served nearby Thorp Arch as well as Boston Spa. The station was closed to passengers on 6 January 1964 and was closed completely on 10 August 1964.

== Location and facilities ==
Thorp Arch station was located north of the level crossing with Church Causeway between the villages of Thorp Arch and Walton.

The station building was designed by George Townsend Andrews in the Gothic revival style. The two-storey stationmaster's house is immediately adjacent. The size of the building and its representative appearance are due to the popularity of nearby Boston Spa, and the latter was the reason for the station being called Thorp Arch (Boston Spa) until 1961.

There were two side platforms. North of station was the goods yard with a long loop serving a cattle dock, a short siding through the goods shed, and another siding with an end dock. From the latter, two sidings branched off to the coal drops. The signal box stood on the up side south of the level crossing.

== Serving the Royal Ordnance Factory ==
Construction of the Thorp Arch Royal Ordnance Factory began in February 1940. Initially, all building materials were delivered to Thorp Arch station. On 24 June 1940, new sidings were opened nearer to the factory. The Thorp Arch station platforms were extended in June 1941 to cope with the increasing passenger traffic. Later, a railway loop with four stations was built around the factory, which joined the Harrogate–Church Fenton line by means of two junctions south of Thorp Arch station.

The internal railway and the traffic associated with the Ordnance Factory is described in two articles "The Thorp Arch And The Circular Railway" by Mike Christensen, British Railway Journal, Part 1 in number 65 and part 2 in 66.

== Current situation ==
The station building and stationmaster's house still exist, as does the down platform. The building has undergone only a few external alterations and is used both as a private residence and holiday accommodation (former waiting room). The up platform has been removed. The goods shed is also preserved, and there are some remains of the coal drops.

The station building and the goods shed (mistakenly referred to as an "engine shed") were given a Grade II listing in February 1988.

The trackbed can be followed on a bridleway running north to Wetherby and south across Wharfe Bridge to Newton Kyme. Sustrans Route 665.

== See also ==
- Listed buildings in Thorp Arch

| Preceding station | Disused railways | Following station |
|---|---|---|
| Newton Kyme; Line closed; station closed | Harrogate to Church Fenton Line | Wetherby Racecourse; Line closed; station closed |
