= Bayford & Co =

British conglomerate company

Bayford & Co Ltd
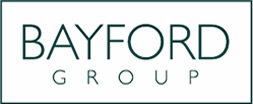
- Type: Private
- Industry: Fuel cards; Commercial property lets; Upmarket holiday homes
- Founded: 1919
- Headquarters: Bowcliffe Hall, UK
- Key people: Chief Executives: Jonathan Turner and Liz Slater; Managing Director: Lindsay Austin; Operations Director: Chris Ritchie

The Bayford Group is a British company founded in 1919 in Leeds, England. For over 100 years The Bayford Group has developed and invested in a diverse portfolio of companies. Energy has always been the core of the business, from the original 1919 coal merchant business set up by 4 soldiers in Yorkshire, and named after the village where they had been demobbed, Bayford in Hertfordshire – oil distribution in the 60s, energy supply in the 90s to the multimillion-pound acquisition of Gulf Gas & Power almost a century later in 2017.

== History ==

Bayford was founded in Leeds by four survivors of the First World War who decided to pool their resources to establish a coal agents business. Whilst searching for a suitable title for their enterprise, they hit on the idea of using the name of the Hertfordshire village of Bayford where they had been demobilized at the end of the war. They were joined by Frederick Turner as an office junior. He eventually rose to become the Company Chairman and remained so until the 1970s. The Bayford company maintained a steady growth in the solid fuel business in the first period of its life – successfully weathering difficult periods such as the General Strike, Second World War, and the nationalisation of the coal industry. The firm then diversified into the petrol and oil distribution business as coal declined.

=== 1950s–1980s ===
David Turner joined his father Frederick in the business in 1958 and in 1962 it was David Turner's decision to start selling oil, based on the view that as more and more people were turning from coal to oil for home heating, "one followed the customer or lost the business". In 1967 Bayford moved to new premises in Pepper Road, off Hunslet Road, Leeds and Bayford also began importing cargoes of oil from abroad via Immingham, to feed its Fleet storage facility and its tankers. This was a first for a UK independent company.

In 1969 Bayford decided to market low price petrol. The name Thrust was inspired by news reports of Concorde’s maiden flight and the description of the "tremendous thrust" of its engines. The first petrol pump to carry the new sign, complete with the Concorde insignia, was in Ossett, West Yorkshire. Thrust rapidly built up to a chain of 45 outlets by the end of 1970 and 85 by 1972.

In 1970 Bayford Developments started trading by purchasing investment properties in Biggin Hill and Mitchum in Surrey.

By 1976 Bayford was delivering 100,000 tonnes of coal each week to Yorkshire's power stations, after striking an agreement with the CEGB (Central Electricity Generating Board). Bayford continued to supply significant quantities of coal into the 1990s, and during the 1980s were also supplying some 3 million litres of oil per day to the region's power stations.

By 1979 the company's Fleet Storage depot by the Aire and Calder Canal in Leeds had an annual throughput of 150,000 tons of fuel per year.

Bayford was still heavily involved in the coal market in the 1980s. At its peak, Bayford Mining was producing from sites in Yorkshire, Lancashire and in the North and East of Scotland. The average life of an opencast mine was around 18 months, after which time the land was restored to its former use.

=== Growth in the 1990s and 2000s ===
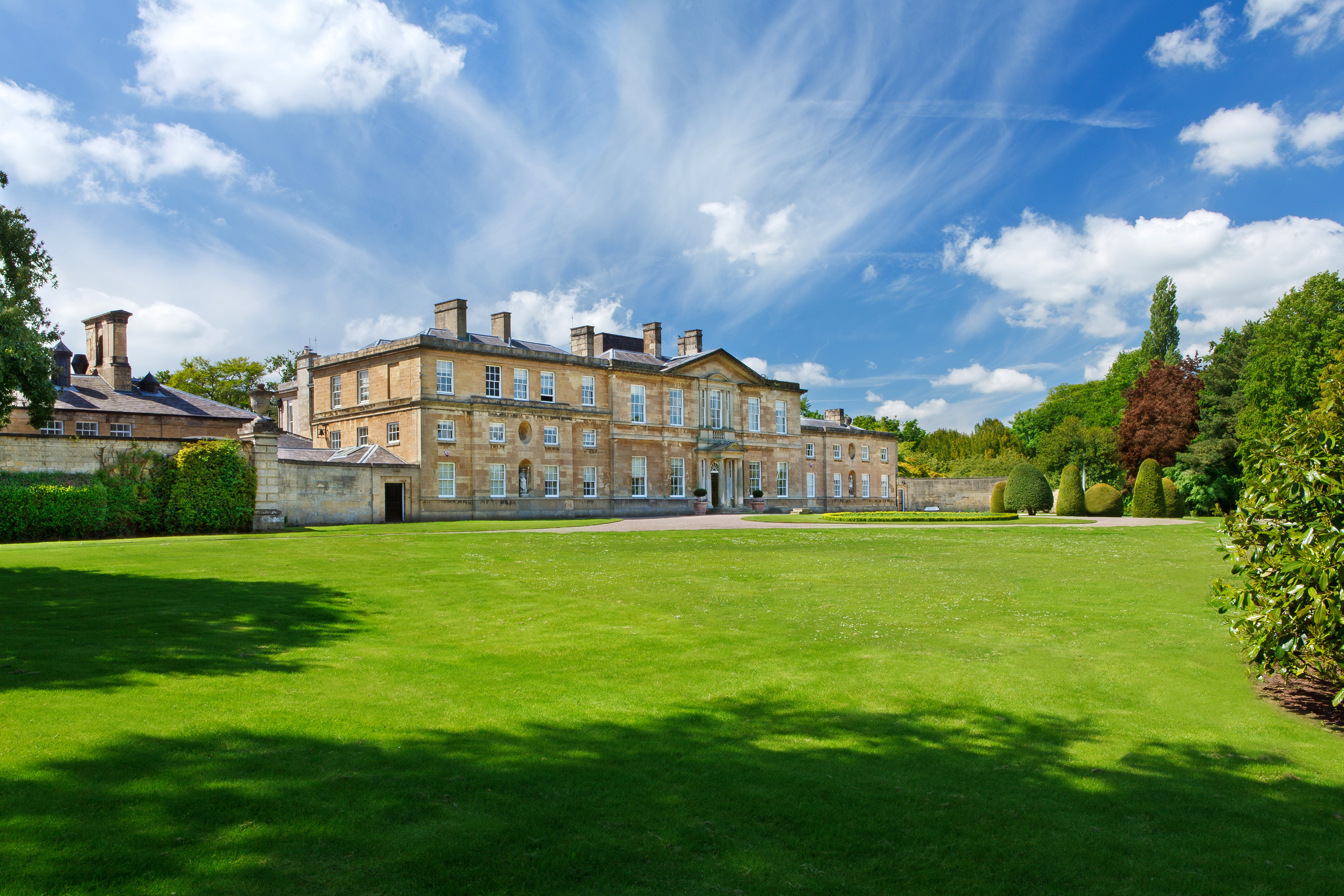
Bowcliffe Hall in Bramham, Wetherby – front view of the hall.

In 1988 Bayford moved into new headquarters at Bowcliffe Hall in Bramham, West Yorkshire – a 19th-century listed building next to the Bramham Park Grounds.

In the first of several acquisitions, Bayford took over Holderness Fuel Supplies Ltd in 1991. Holderness had a throughput of 35 million litres from three depots, in Leeds, Humberside and Malton, North Yorkshire. Bayford bought out British Fuel's share of the Fleet Storage facility at Woodlesford in 1993. Bayford acquired twenty-two Yorkshire filling stations from Elf Oil (UK) Ltd and seven petrol station sites in the North East from Texaco, which were operated under the Thrust Petroleum brand in 1994. Bayford acquired the commercial oil business, Burmah Petroleum Fuels Ltd in 1995. The move effectively tripled the size of Bayford's oil business and made it Britain's largest privately owned distributor of commercial oils.

Jonathan Turner was appointed Managing Director of the "Bayford Group" in 2000.

In 2001 Bayford gained the UK rights to the Gulf brand, in a deal with Gulf Oil International, and also launched a new business, (Gulf Lubricants UK Ltd.), in association with Gulf, to market and sell lubricants. The company became involved in a £47 million deal to buy the 400-strong network of Save petrol stations, the largest independent petrol network in the UK.

Bayford launched Countrywide Fuel Cards in partnership with BP in 2003, selling fuel cards through BP branded sites. Bayford also launched InterCity Fuel Cards in partnership with Shell, operating initially as separate businesses.

In 2004 Jonathan Turner bought Bayford and Company Ltd. from family shareholders.

Following the Fambo buy-out, Bayford acquired three new fuel card businesses, Central Fuel Cards, Truckhaven Ltd and Routemate Fuel Cards. This saw Bayford's fuel card business become the only company to have partnerships with the three biggest fuel brands in the UK, Esso, Shell and BP, as well as adding the most widely accepted diesel-bunkering card on the market, to its portfolio. By taking over three fuel card businesses and the two fuel distribution companies, Bayford earned itself the title of "Acquirer of the Year 2006" at the Business XL Magazine Company of the Year Awards.

Following a year of record profits and sustained organic growth, in 2006 Bayford completed the acquisition of Askham Oil Supplies, one of the UK's leading authorised distributors for Texaco. Bayford's fuel distribution operations now extend from North Wales to the Lincolnshire coast, and right up to the Scottish border.

=== A change of direction ===
In 2007 Liz Slater was appointed Managing Director of Bayford & Company Ltd., with Jonathan Turner becoming the company's Chief Executive.

In 2007 Bayford & Co Ltd sold The Fuelcard Company to US-based card operator Fleetcor. Bayford retained its Truckhaven and Countrywide Fuelcards business as an official distributor of BP fuel cards. In June 2008 Truckhaven and Countrywide Fuelcards were brought together under one brand, Be Fuelcards.

In 2009 Jonathan Turner took the decision to sell Bayford Oil, heatingoil.co.uk and Gulf to GB Oils, a DCC company. Following the sale to GB Oils, the Bayford Group retained Be Fuelcards, Bayford Properties and Bayford Developments.

In 2010 Bayford launched Decadent Retreats, a company letting luxury holiday accommodation. The properties include the 13,000 acre Laudale Estate, a Scottish Estate located on the shores of Loch Sunart, 6 self-catering cottages located within the Laudale Estate and a luxury villa located in La Manga Club, Spain.

2011 saw the launch of several new ventures for the Bayford company. The Right Fuelcard Company was established in Hunslet, Leeds as an independent agent selling exclusively the Shell fuel card. In the same year Rontec Investments LLP, a consortium led by Snax 24, purchased assets from Total including 810 retail sites. Immediately, following the acquisition, 254 of these retail sites were sold to Shell UK for £240 million.

In the deal The Right Fuelcard Company, part of the Bayford Group and a partner in the Rontec consortium, acquired Total's fuel card customers. Shell agreed that The Right Fuelcard Company could market the joint branded fuel card. Early in 2012 existing Total card holders will receive a new dual-branded card enabling them to draw fuel from either Total or Shell sites. Over time, company-owned Total sites will be rebranded as Shell. In respect of dealer owned sites, the decision as to which brand to go with will be theirs.

In the same year Jaytee Ripon LLP was set up and submitted an application to build a motorway service area on the A1 near Ripon. Bayford Properties also embarked on a building project to add a block of 14 apartments a few miles further north, in Northallerton. These were completed in 2012.

2014 saw the completion of a multi-phase refurbishment and development of Bayford Group HQ, Bowcliffe Hall near Wetherby, West Yorkshire. The brainchild of CEO Jonathan Turner, the £6 million development saw the creation of a conference and events venue built in the shape of an airplane wing, the Blackburn Wing, the conversion of redundant buildings into office space and the creation of a private members' club, the Bowcliffe Drivers' Club. 2015 saw further re-development at Bayford Group HQ with the restoration of Bowcliffe Hall's original Drawing Room into an events venue, the Ballroom.

In 2017, the Bayford Group acquired the licence to set up Gulf Gas & Power for the UK and the Netherlands, selling gas and electricity to homes and businesses.

2017 also saw the purchase of The Yorke Arms, a Michelin starred restaurant with rooms located in the Yorkshire Dales.

Today the Bayford Group remains a diverse holding company with interests in energy, fuel cards, property investment, development and letting, hospitality, events and e-commerce.

In November 2019, Lindsay Austin was announced by the Bayford Group as its new Managing Director.

In March 2020, The Bayford Group has bought E (Gas and Electricity) Ltd, a retailer of gas and electricity that has a £160 million turnover.
