= Listed buildings in Bramham cum Oglethorpe =

Bramham cum Oglethorpe is a civil parish in the metropolitan borough of the City of Leeds, West Yorkshire, England. It contains 40 listed buildings that are recorded in the National Heritage List for England. Of these, nine are listed at Grade I, the highest of the three grades, two are at Grade II*, the middle grade, and the others are at Grade II, the lowest grade. The parish contains the village of Bramham and the surrounding area. In the parish is Bramham Park, a country house, which is listed together with a number of structures in its grounds. (Note: Part of Bramham Park is in the parish of Barwick in Elmet and Scholes.) The other listed buildings include houses, cottages and associated structures, farmhouses and farm buildings, a church, the remains of a medieval cross, a disused windmill, a former aircraft hangar, and a war memorial.

== Key ==
Grade	Criteria
I	Buildings of exceptional interest, sometimes considered to be internationally important
II*	Particularly important buildings of more than special interest
II	Buildings of national importance and special interest

== Buildings ==
Name and location	Photograph	Date	Notes	Grade
All Saints Church; 53.88176°N 1.35185°W		12th century	The church, which incorporates some Anglo-Saxon material, was altered during the following centuries and restored in 1853. It is in magnesian limestone with a stone slate roof, and consists of a nave, north and south aisles, a south porch, a chancel with a north vestry and organ chamber, and a west tower. The tower has three stages and contains small round-headed windows, clock faces, a corbel table, an embattled parapet with corner pinnacles and gargoyles, and a short recessed octagonal spire. The nave has an embattled parapet on a corbel table with gargoyles and pinnacles.	II*
Cross remains 53.87845°N 1.32707°W	—	Late medieval	The remains of the cross are in magnesian limestone. They consist of a base about 1 metre (3 ft 3 in) square and 0.5 metres (1 ft 8 in) high, the upper part brought to an octagon, on which is the stump of an octagonal shaft.	II
Hillside; 53.88102°N 1.35281°W	—	Early 17th century (possible)	A farmhouse, later a private house, with a timber framed core, encased in stone in the later 17th century. The house is in magnesian limestone with a pantile roof, and has one storey with attics and three bays. The doorway has a pantiled canopy, some of the windows are horizontally-sliding sashes, and there are two gabled dormers.	II
Old Malt Kiln; 53.88086°N 1.34953°W	—	Early 17th century	A timber framed house, encased in stone in the 18th century, it is in magnesian limestone with quoins, and a pantile roof with a parapet on the left gable end. There are two storeys, three bays, and a rear outshut. In the centre is an inserted bow window, and the other windows are casements. Inside, there is evidence of timber framing, and an inglenook fireplace.	II
Bramham Biggin; 53.87525°N 1.35916°W		17th century	A large house that was restored in 1755–56, it is mainly in magnesian limestone, on a plinth, with quoins, continuous moulded hood moulds on two levels, and a stone slate roof with coped gables, kneelers and finials. There are three storeys and an H-shaped plan, with a central bay and projecting gabled cross-wings. In the centre is a doorway with an architrave and a pediment on consoles. Flanking and above it are sash windows, and in the top floor is a Diocletian window. The cross wings contain a Venetian window in the ground floor and sash windows above. There are mullioned windows at the rear and bay windows on the sides.	II*
Barn, Headley Hall; 53.86798°N 1.32463°W		17th century (probable)	The barn is in magnesian limestone with quoins and a pantile roof. It contains modern sliding doors, vents, an altered wagon entrance, and a lancet-shaped owl hole.	II
Old Hall House; 53.88249°N 1.35065°W	—	1681	The house, which was later remodelled, is in magnesian limestone on a plinth with a stone slate roof. There are two storeys and attics, and an H-shaped plan, consisting of a two-bay main range and flanking gabled cross-wings. The central doorway has an architrave, a moulded hood mould, and an initialled and dated lintel. The windows are sashes with lintels scored to resemble voussoirs. In the left return is a canted bay window and a gabled dormer.	II
Heygate Farmhouse; 53.88062°N 1.35081°W	—	1682 (probable)	The farmhouse, later a private house, has been altered and extended. It is in magnesian limestone, and has a tile roof with coped gables and kneelers. There are two storeys, three bays, and an added bay on the left. The doorway has a chamfered surround, and a large rectangular lintel, above which is an inscribed and dated stone. The windows are horizontally-sliding sashes.	II
Bramham Park; 53.87015°N 1.38033°W		c. 1705	A country house for Robert Benson, and probably designed by him, it was damaged by fire in 1828, and restored in 1906–14 by Detmar Blow. It is in magnesian limestone with stone slate roofs. The house has a main range and is linked by colonnades to pavilions. The main range has a moulded cornice, a balustraded parapet, three storeys, a double-pile U-shaped plan, and a symmetrical front of 13 bays. The entrance in the piano nobile floor is approached by ramped steps with a balustrade, and has double doors with an architrave, a triple keystone and a cornice on consoles, and the windows are sashes. The colonnades have three bays, Tuscan columns and entablatures, and the pavilions have two storeys and hipped roofs. At the rear, the doorway has Corinthian columns and a segmental pediment, and is approached by a curved double staircase.	I
Obelisk Pond and Great Cascade, Bramham Park; 53.86767°N 1.37853°W		1724–25	A rectangular pond fed by two basins on the west side, and with cascades and three basins on the south side, all with walls and surrounds in magnesian limestone. The great cascade has twelve steps, and ends in a segmental pond fed by dragon head spouts. The area is surrounded by terraces with retaining walls and flights of steps.	I
Stable block (main), Bramham Park; 53.87006°N 1.37937°W		1724–27	Pavilions were added to the stable block in about 1760. The building is in magnesian limestone with slate roofs, and is in Palladian style. It consists of a main range flanked by screen walls and pavilions, and with a receding rear wall on the left. The main range has two storeys and nine bays, the middle three bays forming a portico with four Tuscan columns and a pediment containing an oeil-de-boeuf window. The doorway has a rusticated surround, and a keystone. The outer bays contain an arch in their middle bays, sash windows, a moulded cornice and a parapet. In the centre of the roof is a clock tower with a rotunda, a ball finial, and a weathervane. The screen walls contain niches, and the pavilions are gabled with two storeys and three bays. In the upper floor of each is a Venetian window flanked by niches.	I
Gate piers and wall, Bramham Park; 53.87060°N 1.37890°W	—	Early 18th century	The gate piers at the entrance to the forecourt are in magnesian limestone. Each pier has pilasters on four sides and columns on three sides, and all have vermiculated bands, an entablature and a cornice, and are surmounted by a heraldic beast with a shield. Attached to the piers are L-shaped low walls, at the front joining to rectangular pedestals surmounted by sphinxes. The retaining wall runs along the forecourt and has rounded coping.	I
Ha-ha, Bramham Park; 53.87120°N 1.38330°W	—	Early 18th century (probable)	The ha-ha, which forms the boundary wall to the north terrace, is in magnesian limestone. It is about 400 metres (1,300 ft) long, with a return at the east end of about 100 metres (330 ft). The wall is about 2 metres (6 ft 7 in) high, with rounded coping, and it contains rectangular piers and drainage spouts at intervals.	II
Open Temple, Bramham Park; 53.86684°N 1.38617°W		Early 18th century (probable)	The building is in magnesian limestone and in Classical style. It has three bays and a moulded pediment. There are Tuscan corner pilasters, and an entablature containing a Venetian screen with short Tuscan columns, a central moulded arch with a keystone, and an oculus in each outer bay.	I
Parterre, Bramham Park; 53.86982°N 1.38124°W		Early 18th century	The parterre has walls and associated structures in magnesian limestone. It has a rectangular plan, about 70 metres (230 ft) by 35 metres (115 ft). The side and end walls have a plinth and vermiculated raised panels. At the inner end of each side wall is a carved pillar about 1 metre (3 ft 3 in) square and 4 metres (13 ft) that has a pedestal with a vermiculated panel, on which is a pillar between volutes, with an entablature surmounted by a swan-neck pediment. The end wall has a central bow containing a fountain and a rusticated pilaster at each end. The straight sections contain coved niches, and on the coping are six fluted urns with ramshead handles.	I
Stone Nymph, Bramham Park; 53.87006°N 1.38403°W	—	Early 18th century (probable)	The statue is in magnesian limestone, and stands on a square pedestal about 2 metres (6 ft 7 in) high, its sides carved with martial and musical motifs, and with a moulded cap. The statue depicts a draped female figure with her arm raised.	II
Sundial, Bramham Park; 53.86995°N 1.38088°W	—	Early 18th century (probable)	The sundial in the centre of the parterre is in magnesian limestone. It has a base of two octagonal steps, and consists of a vase pedestal with a splayed cap, on which is an inscribed brass plate and a scrolled gnomon.	II
Vase carved with Four Faces, Bramham Park; 53.86932°N 1.38552°W	—	Early 18th century (probable)	The vase is in magnesian limestone, and has a square base and a cubic pedestal with raised vermiculated panels and a moulded cap. The vase has a square section with concave sides containing carved faces in garlands.	II
Manor House; 53.88026°N 1.34996°W	—	Early 18th century	A farmhouse, later divided into two dwellings, it is in magnesian limestone with quoins and a pantile roof. There are two storeys and an attic, and an L-shaped plan, with a four-bay front, a rear wing, and an outshut in the angle. Two doorways have been inserted, with rectangular fanlights and lintels. Most of the windows are sashes, and there is an attic dormer.	II
T-Pond, Bramham Park; 53.86708°N 1.38276°W	—	1728 (probable)	A formal water feature, it consists of a long arm with earthen banks, and a cross-piece at 60 degrees with retaining walls of magnesian limestone.	I
Stable block (south), Bramham Park; 53.86980°N 1.37883°W	—	Early to mide 18th century (probable)	The stable block to the south of the main stable block is in magnesian limestone, with quoins and a pyramidal stone slate roof. There are two storeys, a square plan, and four bays. On the west front is a blocked arcade of four elliptical arches, each containing a stable door, and above are two two-light windows.	II
Gothic Temple, Bramham Park; 53.86675°N 1.38105°W		1750	A summer house and water tower, the building is in magnesian limestone, in Gothic style, and it has an octagonal plan, two storeys and buttresses on the angles. There are two doorways with pointed-arched heads, and similar windows in the other faces, all with intersecting tracery. Above these are circular windows in spherical triangles, a string course, a moulded cornice, and ogee-shaped battlements pierced with trefoils.	I
Chapel, Bramham Park; 53.87094°N 1.38136°W		1750–62	Originally a summer house designed by James Paine in Classical style, the chapel is in magnesian limestone with a stone slate roof. There are two storeys and three bays. At the front is a porch with four Ionic columns, an entablature, a dentilled cornice, and a balustraded parapet. The doorway has a round head, a fanlight with radiating glazing bars, and is flanked by sash windows with balustrades below. The upper floor has a pediment and square windows. On the sides are single-storey semi-octagonal wings, each on a plinth, and containing a coved niche with a balustrade, and with a semi-pyramidal roof.	I
Circular pond and fountain, Bramham Park; 53.86958°N 1.37986°W	—	18th century (probable)	The circular pond on the east side of the terrace is in magnesian limestone and has a moulded rim and a diameter of about 3 metres (9.8 ft). In the centre is a stone fountain about 1 metre (3 ft 3 in) high consisting of a vase pedestal with three fish twined around it.	II
North Lodge and screen wall, Bramham Park; 53.87972°N 1.36948°W	—	18th century	The lodge is in magnesian limestone with a pyramidal slate roof. There are two storeys and one bay, and a single-storey wing on the right. The lodge has vermiculated quoins and a floor band, and it contains a doorway with a triple keystone and a casement window above. The wing has a coped gable with kneelers, and contains a sash window. Attached to the rear is a screen wall containing a doorway.	II
Gate piers and garden wall, Oglethorpe Old Hall Farmhouse; 53.89244°N 1.32153°W	—	18th century	The wall to the north of the garden and the gate piers are in magnesian limestone. The gate piers have a square section, and each pier is about 3 metres (9.8 ft) high, with a chamfered plinth, a moulded cap, a moulded pyramidal pedestal, and a ball finial. On the inner side of each pier is a scrolled console. The wall is about 2 metres (6 ft 7 in) high and has rounded coping.	II
Stable block, Wellhill Farm; 53.87296°N 1.35871°W	—	18th century	The stable block is in magnesian limestone, with a roof of pantiles and some stone slate. There are two storeys, a rectangular plan, and a symmetrical front of three bays, the middle bay projecting. In the middle bay are doorways and a blind ogee arch above, and the outer bays contain Diocletian windows in the upper floor, and altered doorways below.	II
Windmill; 53.88403°N 1.34524°W		18th century (probable)	The disused windmill is in magnesian limestone, and is tapering with a circular plan. It contains two doorways, one blocked, and square windows. On the east side is an iron ladder and a drainpipe, and the superstructure is missing.	II
Monument to Jet, Bramham Park; 53.86719°N 1.37986°W	—	1764	The monument is to the memory of a dog, and is in magnesian limestone. It consists of a tall quatrefoil column with two annulets, a moulded cruciform cap, and a banded ball and cushion finial. The column stands on a short cubic pedestal with a painted inscription.	II
Carlton House and Carlton Cottage; 53.88072°N 1.38149°W	—	Late 18th century	The house and the cottage attached to the right are in magnesian limestone with stone slate roofs. The house has quoins, a sill band, and a pedimented gable containing a blind oeil-de-boeuf window. There are two storeys and two bays. The round-headed doorway has a fanlight, imposts and a keystone, and the windows are sashes. The cottage has three storeys and two bays. In the first bay is a segmental-headed former wagon entrance converted into a window, and a sash window above. The other windows are replacements.	II
Bowcliffe Hall and screen walls 53.87473°N 1.35524°W		c. 1805	A large house, later used for other purposes, in magnesian limestone with a slate roof, and a double-pile plan. It consists of a central block with two storeys and five bays, the middle three bays projecting under a pediment, which is flanked by five-bay wings, on the left with three storeys, and on the right with two. In the centre is a Tuscan porch and a doorway with a semicircular fanlight, above which is a tripartite window with an Ionic architrave, an apron with a blind balustrade, and an open segmental pediment. In the outer bays are sash windows with sill bands, and over them is a modillioned cornice and a low parapet. The centre parts of the flanking wings project and each contains a niche with a statue and an oculus above. Attached to the outer end of each wing is a quadrant screen wall with a doorway.	II
Bramham Lodge; 53.87723°N 1.35128°W	—	Early 19th century	A house in magnesian limestone with quoins and a hipped slate roof. There are two storeys, a double-depth plan, and a symmetrical front of five bays. The central doorway has an architrave and a cornice, some windows are sashes, and some have been replaced by top-hung casements. On the left return is a single-storey semicircular bay window with a parapet.	II
Old Fox Cottage; 53.87536°N 1.35207°W		Early 19th century	Built as the lodge to Bowcliffe Hall, it is in magnesian limestone with a first floor hood mould, a moulded cornice, an embattled parapet, and a pyramidal slate roof. There are two storeys and a basement, a square plan, and a symmetrical front of three bays. Steps lead up to the central gabled and arched porch and doorway, above which is an inscribed stone plaque. The basement windows are mullioned, and the other windows are mullioned and transomed.	II
Gothic Summer House, Bramham Park; 53.86809°N 1.37974°W		1845	The summer house, later a museum, is in magnesian limestone and in Gothic style. It has a single storey and is symmetrical, consisting of a central bay with buttresses, and flanking wings. In the centre is an arched doorway that has engaged shafts with foliate caps, and a moulded head with a trefoil fanlight, flanked by windows with pointed heads. Above is a string course, a frieze containing a carved shield, and a parapet with four crocketted pinnacles. The recessed lower wings each contains a window with a pointed head and a hood mould, and crocketed pinnacles.	II
Chapel west of Bowcliffe Hall; 53.87486°N 1.35651°W	—	19th century (probable)	The chapel in the garden to the west of the hall is in magnesian limestone with a stone slate roof, and incorporates material from a cell at Nostell Priory. It has a rectangular plan, measuring about 5 metres (16 ft) by 3 metres (9.8 ft). In the south side is a doorway with a chamfered surround, a four-centred arched head and a hood mould, and to the right is a four-light Perpendicular window. There is a similar five-light window in the east gable end, and in the west gable end is a window with four cusped lights.	II
East Lodge Cottages; 53.87500°N 1.36114°W		Mid 19th century (probable)	A pair of cottages in magnesian limestone that have a stone slate roof with coped gables, kneelers and finials. There are two storeys and a U-shaped plan, consisting of a two-bay range and projecting gabled wings. The doorways have chamfered surrounds, and the windows are mullioned, with a continuous hood mould over the ground floor and separate hood moulds above. Over the upper floor windows in the middle range are gablets.	II
Garden folly, Old Hall House; 53.88239°N 1.35023°W	—	Late 19th century (probable)	The folly in the garden of the house contains a privy, and is in the form of a ruined medieval tower. It is in magnesian limestone with a semicircular plan, it is built back-to-earth, and has a single storey, and screen walls. The building contains a doorway and a loop window.	II
Former aircraft hangar 53.86629°N 1.32197°W	—	1916	The aircraft hangar, later used for other purposes, was built by the Royal Flying Corps. It is in timber with panels of steel and concrete laminate, and a segmental-arched roof with felt cladding. The roof has a span of 25 metres (82 ft), and the building is about 50 metres (160 ft) long. At the ends are vertical windows and a central ventilator, and to the north side of the hangar are offices.	II
Bramham War Memorial; 53.88046°N 1.35504°W		1920	The war memorial is at a junction of roads in the centre of the village, and is about 5 metres (16 ft) high. It has a square limestone plinth on a base of three steps, and consists of a Maltese cross on a tapering gritstone shaft. On the front of the shaft is an inscription. Running round the sides of the plinth is an inscription, and on the faces of the plinth are bronze plaques with inscriptions and the names of those lost in the two World Wars. The memorial is enclosed by six wooden posts with linking chains.	II
Set of four obelisks, Bramham Park; 53.87072°N 1.37937°W	—	Undated	At each corner of the lawn in the forecourt of the hall is a small obelisk in magnesian limestone. Each obelisk is about 2 metres (6 ft 7 in) high, and it stands on a base of two courses and a pedestal with a cap.	II

== Notes and references ==
=== Sources ===
- Historic England, "Church of All Saints, Bramham cum Oglethorpe (1313180)", National Heritage List for England
- Historic England, "Remains of cross at SE443426, Bramham cum Oglethorpe (1135647)", National Heritage List for England
- Historic England, "Hillside, Bramham cum Oglethorpe (1200589)", National Heritage List for England
- Historic England, "Old Malt Kiln, Bramham cum Oglethorpe (1313178)", National Heritage List for England
- Historic England, "Bramham Biggin, Bramham cum Oglethorpe (1135632)", National Heritage List for England
- Historic England, "Barn on north side of farmyard adjacent to west side of Headley Hall, Bramham cum Oglethorpe (1200561)", National Heritage List for England
- Historic England, "Old Hall House, Bramham cum Oglethorpe (1135631)", National Heritage List for England
- Historic England, "Heygate Farmhouse, Bramham cum Oglethorpe (1135645)", National Heritage List for England
- Historic England, "Bramham Park, Bramham cum Oglethorpe (1135635)", National Heritage List for England
- Historic England, "Obelisk Pond and the Great Cascade approximately 300 metres south of Bramham Park House, Bramham cum Oglethorpe (1300743)", National Heritage List for England
- Historic England, "Stable block forming south side of forecourt to Bramham Park, Bramham cum Oglethorpe (1135638)", National Heritage List for England
- Historic England, "Gatepiers at entrance to forecourt of Bramham Park, with attached retaining wall, Bramham cum Oglethorpe (1135636)", National Heritage List for England
- Historic England, "Ha-ha forming boundary wall to North Terrace, with returned east end, Bramham cum Oglethorpe (1300761)", National Heritage List for England
- Historic England, "Open Temple at west end of Quarter Mile Walk in Bramham Park, Bramham cum Oglethorpe (1313176)", National Heritage List for England
- Historic England, "Parterre to west of Bramham Park House, with two pillars and six urns, Bramham cum Oglethorpe (1135639)", National Heritage List for England
- Historic England, "Stone Nymph in diamond shaped opening of avenue running west from Chapel at Bramham Park, Bramham cum Oglethorpe (1135641)", National Heritage List for England
- Historic England, "Sundial in centre of parterre to west of Bramham Park House, Bramham cum Oglethorpe (1300751)", National Heritage List for England
- Historic England, "Vase carved with Four Faces at intersection of avenues approximately 320 metres west of Bramham Park House, Bramham cum Oglethorpe (1200465)", National Heritage List for England
- Historic England, "Manor House, Bramham cum Oglethorpe (1200537)", National Heritage List for England
- Historic England, "T-Pond at junction of walks approximately 350 metres south-west of Bramham Park house, Bramham cum Oglethorpe (1135642)", National Heritage List for England
- Historic England, "Stable block at south-east corner of stable courtyard, Bramham cum Oglethorpe (1200426)", National Heritage List for England
- Historic England, "Gothic Temple approximately 370 metres south of Bramham Park House, Bramham cum Oglethorpe (1200485)", National Heritage List for England
- Historic England, "Chapel at north end of terrace to rear of Bramham Park, Bramham cum Oglethorpe (1135640)", National Heritage List for England
- Historic England, "Circular pond with fountain, approximately 50 metres south of Bramham Park house, on east side of terrace, Bramham cum Oglethorpe (1135643)", National Heritage List for England
- Historic England, "North Lodge with attached screen wall, Bramham cum Oglethorpe (1135646)", National Heritage List for England
- Historic England, "Gatepiers and garden wall to Oglethorpe Old Hall Farmhouse at SE446442, Bramham cum Oglethorpe (1313173)", National Heritage List for England
- Historic England, "Stable block linked to North side of Wellhill Farmhouse, Bramham cum Oglethorpe (1135633)", National Heritage List for England
- Historic England, "Windmill, Bramham cum Oglethorpe (1200606)", National Heritage List for England
- Historic England, "Monument to Jet, in dogs' graveyard approximately 50 metres to north of Gothic Temple, Bramham cum Oglethorpe (1313177)", National Heritage List for England
- Historic England, "Carlton House and Carlton Cottage, Bramham cum Oglethorpe (1200583)", National Heritage List for England
- Historic England, "Bowcliffe Hall and attached screen walls, Bramham cum Oglethorpe (1135644)", National Heritage List for England
- Historic England, "Bramham Lodge, Bramham cum Oglethorpe (1313174)", National Heritage List for England
- Historic England, "Old Fox Cottage, Bramham cum Oglethorpe (1393137)", National Heritage List for England
- Historic England, "Gothic Summer House approximately 200 metres south of Bramham Park, Bramham cum Oglethorpe (1300738)", National Heritage List for England
- Historic England, "Chapel in garden approximately 50 metres west of Bowcliffe Hall, Bramham cum Oglethorpe (1300714)", National Heritage List for England
- Historic England, "East Lodge Cottages, Bramham cum Oglethorpe (1135634)", National Heritage List for England
- Historic England, "Garden Folly approximately 20 metres east of Old Hall House, Bramham cum Oglethorpe (1313175)", National Heritage List for England
- Historic England, "Former aircraft hangar approximately 200 metres south-east of Headley Hall Farm, Bramham cum Oglethorpe (1313179)", National Heritage List for England
- Historic England, "Bramham War Memorial, Bramham cum Oglethorpe (1425066)", National Heritage List for England
- Historic England, "Set of four obelisks at corners of lawn in forecourt to Bramham Park, Bramham cum Oglethorpe (1135637)", National Heritage List for England
- Historic England, Listed Buildings
- Leach, Peter; Pevsner, Nikolaus (2009), Yorkshire West Riding: Leeds, Bradford and the North, The Buildings of England, New Haven and London: Yale University Press, ISBN 978-0-300-12665-5
