= Listed buildings in Thorp Arch =

Thorp Arch is a civil parish in the metropolitan borough of the City of Leeds, West Yorkshire, England. The parish contains 27 listed buildings that are recorded in the National Heritage List for England. Of these, one is listed at Grade II*, the middle of the three grades, and the others are at Grade II, the lowest grade. Most of the listed buildings are houses, cottages and associated structures. The other listed buildings include a church and items in the churchyard, a farmhouse and farm buildings, former mill buildings, a road bridge and railway bridges, a railway station and an engine shed, and a former smithy.

== Key ==
Grade	Criteria
II*	Particularly important buildings of more than special interest
II	Buildings of national importance and special interest

== Buildings ==
Name and location	Photograph	Date	Notes	Grade
All Saints' Church; 53.90903°N 1.33476°W		12th century	The oldest part of the church is the south door, the tower dates from the 15th century, and the rest of the church was remodelled in 1871–72 by G. E. Street. It is built in magnesian limestone, and has a roof of Welsh slate and red tile. The church consists of a nave, a north aisle, a south porch, a narrower chancel with a north vestry, and a west tower. The tower is in Perpendicular style, and has diagonal buttresses, a three-light west window, a square sundial with an iron gnomon, two string courses, the upper one with two gargoyles and shields, and an embattled parapet with eight crocketed pinnacles. The south doorway is in Norman style, and has carved capitals to a round arch with beakheads.	II
Font bowl 53.90907°N 1.33494°W	—	12th century (possible)	The font bowl is in the churchyard of All Saints' Church. It is in magnesian limestone, and is a plain bowl with 13 sides, tapering to the base. The rim is damaged.	II
Remains of medieval cross 53.90898°N 1.33495°W	—	Late medieval	The cross base and shaft are in the churchyard of All Saints' Church, and are in magnesian limestone. The base is square with a chamfered top edge, and a socket holding a square shaft with chamfered edges. On the top is a 20th-century sundial disc.	II
Two medieval stone coffins 53.90912°N 1.33476°W	—	Late medieval (probable)	The coffins are in the churchyard of All Saints' Church to the north of the church. One is in gritstone, and the other in magnesian limestone. Both are tapered to the foot, and are hollowed out to receive the body and head.	II
Former water mill 53.90750°N 1.34471°W	—	17th century	A water mill that was later extended and used for other purposes, it is in magnesian limestone with a roof of Welsh slate and stone slate. There are two storeys, a basement and an attic, and three bays. The openings vary, and include a central doorway with a 17th-century lintel cut to form a segmental arch and dated 1867. In the right return, external steps lead up to a doorway with a quoined surround, a cambered lintel, and a raised keystone.	II
Flint Mill and mill race structures 53.92024°N 1.35856°W	—	By 1722	The former water mill, later converted for residential use, is in magnesian limestone, with quoins, and a stone slate roof. There are two storeys and a basement, and fronts of five and three bays. On the front is a segmental-arched doorway flanked by oculi, and casement windows. At the rear, facing the river, is an undershot waterwheel, and in the basement is a cast iron flywheel and a crown wheel. The mill race structures are in gritstone, and include a dam wall, stepped troughs, and a bypass channel.	II
Thorpe Arch Hall; 53.91098°N 1.34758°W	—	1749–56	A large house, later divided, by John Carr, it is in magnesian limestone with hipped Welsh slate roofs. There are two storeys and an attic, a double depth plan, and a front of five bays, flanked by recessed wings with two storeys and three bays. The main house has a plinth, rusticated quoins, a band, and an eaves cornice. Steps lead up to a central doorway that has an architrave, a fanlight, a pulvinated frieze, a pediment on carved consoles, and side lights. The windows are sashes, the window above the doorway is tripartite. The wings also have quoins and sash windows.	II*
Outbuilding north of East Wing, Thorp Arch Hall; 53.91122°N 1.34735°W	—	c. 1750	The outbuilding is in magnesian limestone, with quoins, an eaves band, and a Welsh slate roof with moulded gable copings on the left. There is one storey, fronts of one and three bays, and a lean-to on the left. On the front are five blind windows, and at the rear is a doorway, flanked by casement windows with lintels and keystones. The left return has a pedimented gable and contains a blind Diocletian window in the tympanum.	II
Outbuilding northwest of West Wing, Thorp Arch Hall; 53.91096°N 1.34798°W	—	c. 1750	The outbuilding is in magnesian limestone, with quoins, an eaves band, and a Welsh slate roof with moulded gable copings. There is one storey, and fronts of one and three bays. On the front are casement windows, and in the right return is a pedimented gable with a blind Diocletian window in the tympanum.	II
Bridge Farm House and Cottage with outbuilding 53.90628°N 1.34254°W	—	Mid 18th century	The cottage and outbuilding are the older parts, the farmhouse dating from the early 19th century, and they are in magnesian limestone with a Welsh slate roof. There are two storeys and a rear outshut. The cottage contains quoins, French windows with fanlights, and sash windows. The farmhouse is angled back slightly, and contains a French window with a fanlight, and in the outbuilding are casement windows.	II
Flintmill Grange Farmhouse, pavilions and wall 53.92042°N 1.35703°W	—	Mid 18th century	The farmhouse is in magnesian limestone on a plinth, with a band, an eaves cornice, and a stone slate roof. There are two storeys and an attic, a front of five bays, and coped wing walls linking to two-storey one-bay pavilions. Steps lead up to a central doorway with an architrave, a fanlight, a fluted frieze, and a broken swan-necked pediment. The windows are sashes with keystones, in the returns are attic Diocletian windows, and at the rear is a round-headed stair window. The pavilions have hipped roofs and sash windows, and attached to the pavilions are tall walls lining the east side of the farmyard.	II
Disused font 53.90909°N 1.33513°W	—	1759	The font is in the churchyard of All Saints' Church. It is in magnesian limestone, and is octagonal with a hollow chamfered plinth, a slender shaft, and a simple bowl with a nosed rim.	II
Thorp Arch Bridge; 53.90619°N 1.34403°W		1768–70	The bridge carries Bridge Road over the River Wharfe. It is in magnesian limestone and consists of five segmental arches. The central arch is flanked by cutwaters that rise to form refuges. The bridge has a band, a parapet with chamfered coped, which ends in round-ended piers.	II
Farm buildings, Flintmill Grange Farm; 53.92072°N 1.35717°W		Late 18th century	The farm buildings are in magnesian limestone, and have roofs partly in Welsh slate, and partly in stone slate. They form an L-shaped plan, and include stables, cow houses with haylofts, a barn, a granary, and a dovecote. The oldest part is the barn that has five bays and a plinth. It contains a blocked central cart entry with a quoined surround and a basket arch, slit vents, and pitching holes.	II
Range of buildings north-west of Thorp Arch Mill; 53.90756°N 1.34446°W	—	Late 18th century (probable)	A group of mill buildings later incorporated into a factory, they are in magnesian limestone, with quoins, and roofs of stone slate and sheet asbestos. They form a range of three buildings with three and four storeys. The openings include casement windows, sash windows, some sliding, and segmental-arched doorways. Steps lead up to doorways in the upper floors.	II
42 The Village and flat 53.91033°N 1.34225°W	—	Late 18th or early 19th century	The house is in magnesian limestone, with quoins, and a stone slate roof with shaped kneelers. There are two storeys, three bays, and a single-storey two-bay extension on the left. The doorway is in the centre, the windows are sashes, and in the extension is a blocked doorway.	II
Cartshed with granary, Hall Farm; 53.91170°N 1.34976°W	—	Early 19th century (probable)	The building is in magnesian limestone with a stone slate roof, two storeys and five bays. In the ground floor are four basket-arched cart entries, and a door, and the upper floor contains three rectangular windows. Elsewhere, are casement windows.	II
Smithy; 53.90824°N 1.34224°W	—	Early 19th century	The former smithy at the rear of 11 The Green is in magnesian limestone with a stone slate roof. There is a single storey, and fronts of three and one bay. At the rear are old boarded doors, and a casement window, and on the front are a blind central doorway, a blind window, and a three-light sliding sash window.	II
Railway bridge approximately 525 metres south-east of Walton Gates; 53.91999°N 1.34177°W		1847	The bridge was built by the York and North Midland Railway as an accommodation bridge to carry a track over its line. It is in gritstone and consists of three skew segmental arches. The arches have voussoirs, and they spring from piers with impost bands. The parapets are coped, and end in piers.	II
Railway bridge approximately 940 metres south-east of Walton Gates; 53.91677°N 1.33798°W		1847	The bridge was built by the York and North Midland Railway as an accommodation bridge to carry a track over its line. It is in gritstone and consists of three skew segmental arches. The arches have voussoirs, and they spring from piers with impost bands. The parapets are coped, and end in piers.	II
Thorp Arch station house 53.91282°N 1.33352°W	—	1847	The railway station and attached house are in magnesian limestone with gritstone dressings and a Welsh slate roof. The station has a single storey with a cross-wing on the left containing the ticket office, a wing on the rear right, and the house on the right. Along the front is a four-bay canopy on wooden posts. The ticket office is gabled with copings and kneelers, and contains a three-light transomed window. The house has two storeys, a T-shaped plan, and a gabled front containing a bay window with a casement window above.	II
Railway engine shed 53.91338°N 1.33427°W	—	c. 1850 (probable)	The engine shed at the former Thorp Arch railway station is in magnesian limestone, with dressings in gritstone, and a Welsh slate roof. There is one storey, sides of three and two bays, and an open-sided canopy to the south east with sides of two bays, and carried on cast iron columns. The closed part contains blocked round-arched openings and lunettes.	II
17 and 19 The Village; 53.91013°N 1.34245°W	—	Mid 19th century	A pair of mirror-image estate cottages in magnesian limestone, with overhanging eaves and a Welsh slate roof. There are two storeys and attics, and two bays. The doorways in the outer parts have fanlights, the windows on the front are sashes, and those in the returns have round-arched heads.	II
38 and 40 The Village; 53.91011°N 1.34210°W	—	Mid 19th century	A pair of mirror-image estate cottages in magnesian limestone, with overhanging eaves and a Welsh slate roof. There are two storeys and attics, and two bays. The doorways in the outer parts have fanlights, the windows on the front are sashes, and those in the returns have round-arched heads.	II
Causeway Cottage and Lime Tree Cottage; 53.90788°N 1.34186°W	—	Mid 19th century	A pair of mirror-image estate cottages in magnesian limestone, with overhanging eaves and a Welsh slate roof. There are two storeys and attics, and two bays. The doorways in the outer parts have fanlights, the windows on the front are sashes, in the returns they have round-arched heads, and in the right attic is a Venetian window.	II
General Stores, cottages and shop 53.90749°N 1.34188°W	—	Mid 19th century	A pair of mirror-image estate cottages in magnesian limestone, with overhanging eaves and a Welsh slate roof. There are two storeys and attics, two bays, and flanking single-storey single-bay wings. The doorways have fanlights, the windows in the main block are sashes, and in the wings are shop windows.	II
Rye Cottage and adjoining cottage 53.90770°N 1.34189°W	—	Mid 19th century	A pair of mirror-image estate cottages in magnesian limestone, with overhanging eaves and a Welsh slate roof. There are two storeys and attics, and two bays. The doorways in the outer parts have fanlights, the windows on the front are sashes, in the returns they have round-arched heads, in the left attic is a Venetian window, and Rye Cottage has a 20th-century dormer.	II
