= Bowcliffe Hall =

House in Bramham, West Yorkshire, England

Coordinates: 53.8747°N 1.3551°W

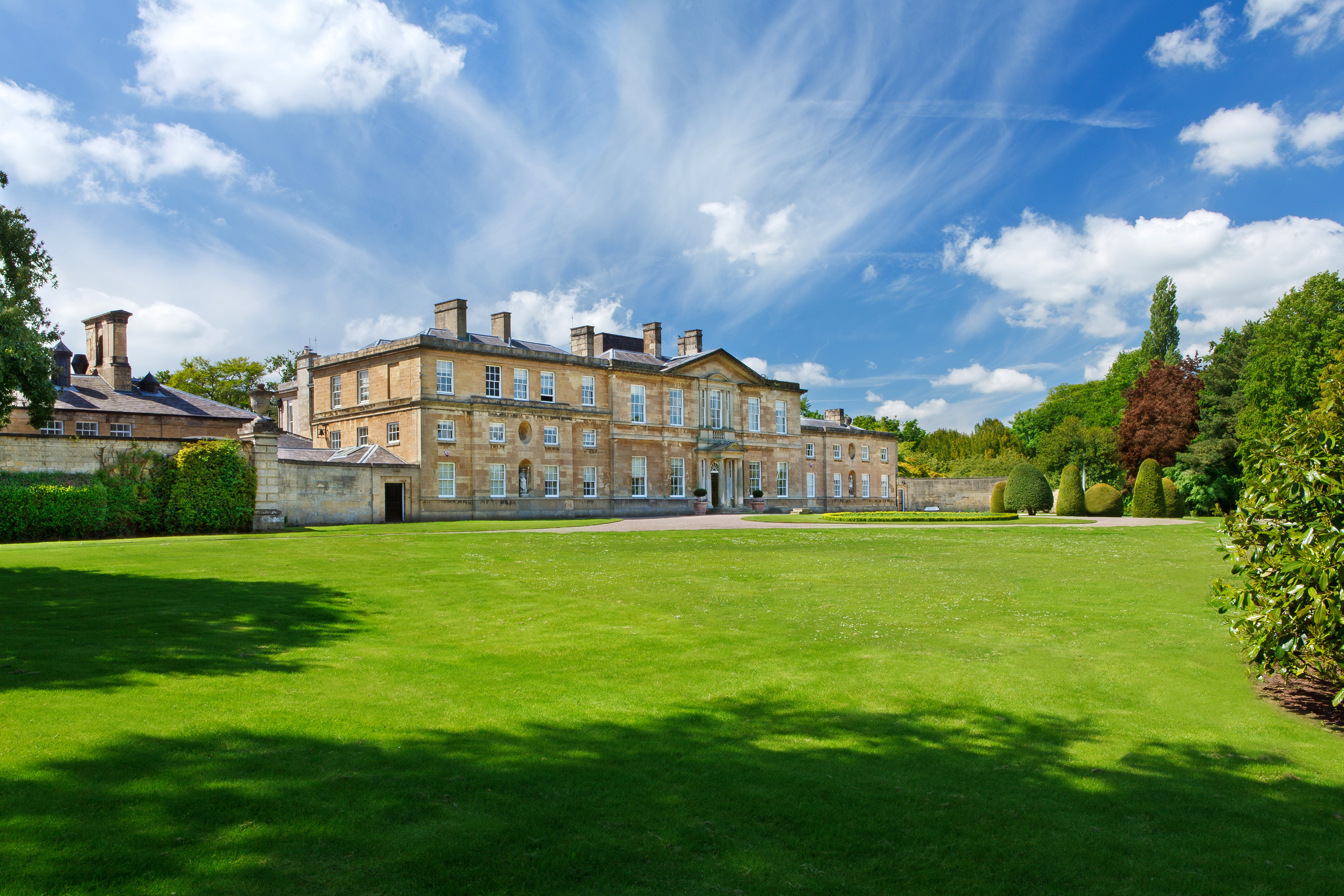
Bowcliffe Hall

Bowcliffe Hall is located at Bramham near Wetherby, West Yorkshire, England. Built between 1805 and 1825, Bowcliffe Hall is a Grade II listed building now used as an office and event space. The building is constructed of ashlar limestone, under a shallow pitched slate roof to a rectangular double pile floor plan. It is mainly built across two storeys, although the East Wing has been modified to three.

== History ==
Construction of Bowcliffe Hall was begun in 1805 by William Robinson, a cotton spinner from Manchester. After completing only the West Wing, Robinson sold the property for £2,000 to John Smyth, who finished the estate. Smyth died in 1840 and the house was put into trust by his daughters pending sale. The entrusted estate was purchased by George Lane Fox, whose own house, the neighbouring Bramham Park, had been severely fire damaged in 1828.

George Lane Fox, known as 'The Gambler', was the MP for Beverley. He died in 1848 and was succeeded by his only son, also George, known as 'The Squire'. The latter died in 1896 and was succeeded by his grandson George (his eldest son having become a clergyman) who was MP for Barkston Ash. He renovated Bramham Park and moved back there in 1907. Bowcliffe was then purchased by Walter Geoffrey Jackson, the managing director of mining company Henry Briggs Son and Company.

In 1917, the house was bought by Jessy Blackburn whose husband was Robert Blackburn from Kirkstall, the chairman of Blackburn Aircraft Limited. They raised five children there and he lived there until 1950 following their divorce after the death their son Rob. Blackburn and his family were the last to use the hall as a residential home. As an aviation pioneer, Blackburn built his first monoplane in 1909, making him the first Yorkshire-man to design and produce a powered flying aircraft. Much of his company's test flying was carried out over Filey, Roundhay Park and Brough. Blackburn made the world's first scheduled flight between Leeds and Bradford in 1914, with the Mayor of Leeds among his first passengers.

In 1955, Robert Blackburn died, and following his death the house was sold to the Hargreaves fuel company in May 1956 for office use, passing into the ownership of the Bayford Group in 1988.

Over recent years, Bowcliffe Hall has undergone extensive refurbishment into office space and a corporate and private events venue. The final stage of the redevelopment has included creating two new office suites from formerly redundant buildings; Rosemount and the Cricket Pavilion, and the creation of The Blackburn Wing conference and events centre, Clad in copper with floor to ceiling windows, The Blackburn Wing's design pays homage to Robert Blackburn's achievements.

== See also ==
- Listed buildings in Bramham cum Oglethorpe
