= Harrogate and District Football League =

Association football league in England

- Founded: 1899
- Subdivisions: Premier Division, Division One
- Country: England
- Most recent champion: Bedale
- Feeder to: West Yorkshire League, York League, North Riding League

The Harrogate and District Football League was a football competition based in North Yorkshire, England. It had two divisions, the highest of which, the Premier Division was a feeder to the West Yorkshire League. The league folded at the end of the 2023–24 season due to a lack of teams.

== Champions ==
Season	Premier	One	Two	Three
2005–06	Sherwood	Bedale Town	Albert	Half Moon
2006–07	Sherwood	Bramham	Horsforth St. Margaret's Reserves	Yorkshire Amateurs
2007–08	Thirsk Falcons	Pateley Bridge	Silsden	Westbrook YMCA Reserves
2008–09	Thirsk Falcons	Harold Styans	Leeds City Reserves	Wetherby Athletic 'A'
2009–10	Kirkby Malzeard	Harrogate Railway Reserves	Wigton Moor	Bedale Town Reserves
2010–11	Thirsk Falcons	Beckwithshaw Saints	Bedale Town Reserves	Wigton Moor Reserves
2011–12	Thirsk Falcons	Killinghall Nomads	Burley Trojans	Leyburn United
2012–13	Beckwithshaw Saints	Rawdon Old Boys	Hampsthwaite United	AFC Hillside Reserves
2013–14	Kirk Deighton Rangers	Bedale Town	Bramham	
2014–15	Rawdon Old Boys	Hampsthwaite United	AFC Horsforth	
2015–16	Bedale Town	AFC Horsforth	Knaresborough Celtic Reserves	
2016–17	Kirk Deighton Rangers	Thirsk Falcons	Kirk Deighton Rangers Reserves	
2017–18	Harlow Hill	Ventus Yeadon Celtic		
2018–19	Harlow Hill	Bedale Reserves		
2019–20	Season curtailed due to coronavirus disease pandemic			
2020–21	Bramhope	Boroughbridge Development		
2021–22	Harlow Hill	Kirkstall Crusaders		
2022–23	Harlow Hill	Bedale		
2023–24	Bedale			

== Final member clubs ==
Premier Division

- Beckwithshaw Saints
- Beckwithshaw Saints Reserves
- Bedale
- Boroughbridge Development
- Burley Trojans
- Dalton Athletic
- Hampsthwaite FC
- Harlow Hill Reserves
- Kirkstall Crusaders
- Pannal Sports
- Ripon City Reserves
- Ventus/Yeadon Celtic
