= All Saints' Church, Thorp Arch =

Coordinates: 53°54′32.6″N 1°20′05.6″W

All Saints'
- All Saints' Church
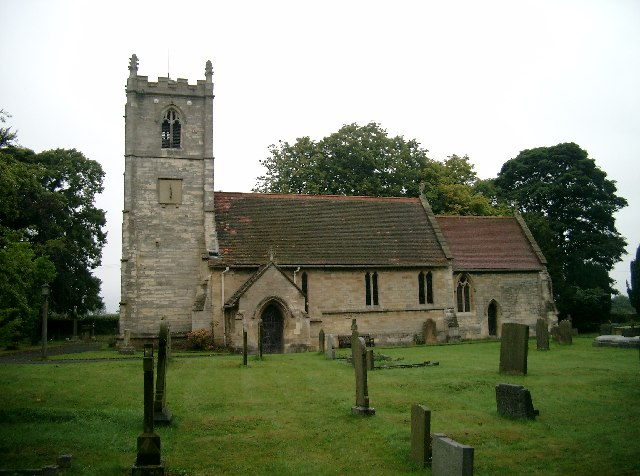
- All Saints'
- OS grid reference: SE 43796 46080
- Location: Thorp Arch, West Yorkshire
- Country: England
- Denomination: Church of England

History
- Status: Parish Church

Architecture
- Heritage designation: Grade II listed building
- Architect: G. E. Street
- Architectural type: mixed, with Gothic Revival elements
- Completed: 1872 in current form

Specifications
- Materials: Magnesian limestone with red tile and Welsh slate roofs

Administration
- Province: York
- Diocese: York
- Deanery: Wetherby
- Parish: Thorp Arch

All Saints' Church in Thorp Arch, West Yorkshire, England is an active Anglican parish church in the Archdeaconry of York and the Diocese of York.

== History ==
The church is of twelfth century origin (the south door being the sole remaining aspect of this era); although is mentioned in the earlier Domesday Book of 1086. with a fifteenth century tower; the remainder of the church was built between 1871 and 1872 to designs by G. E. Street.

== Architectural style ==
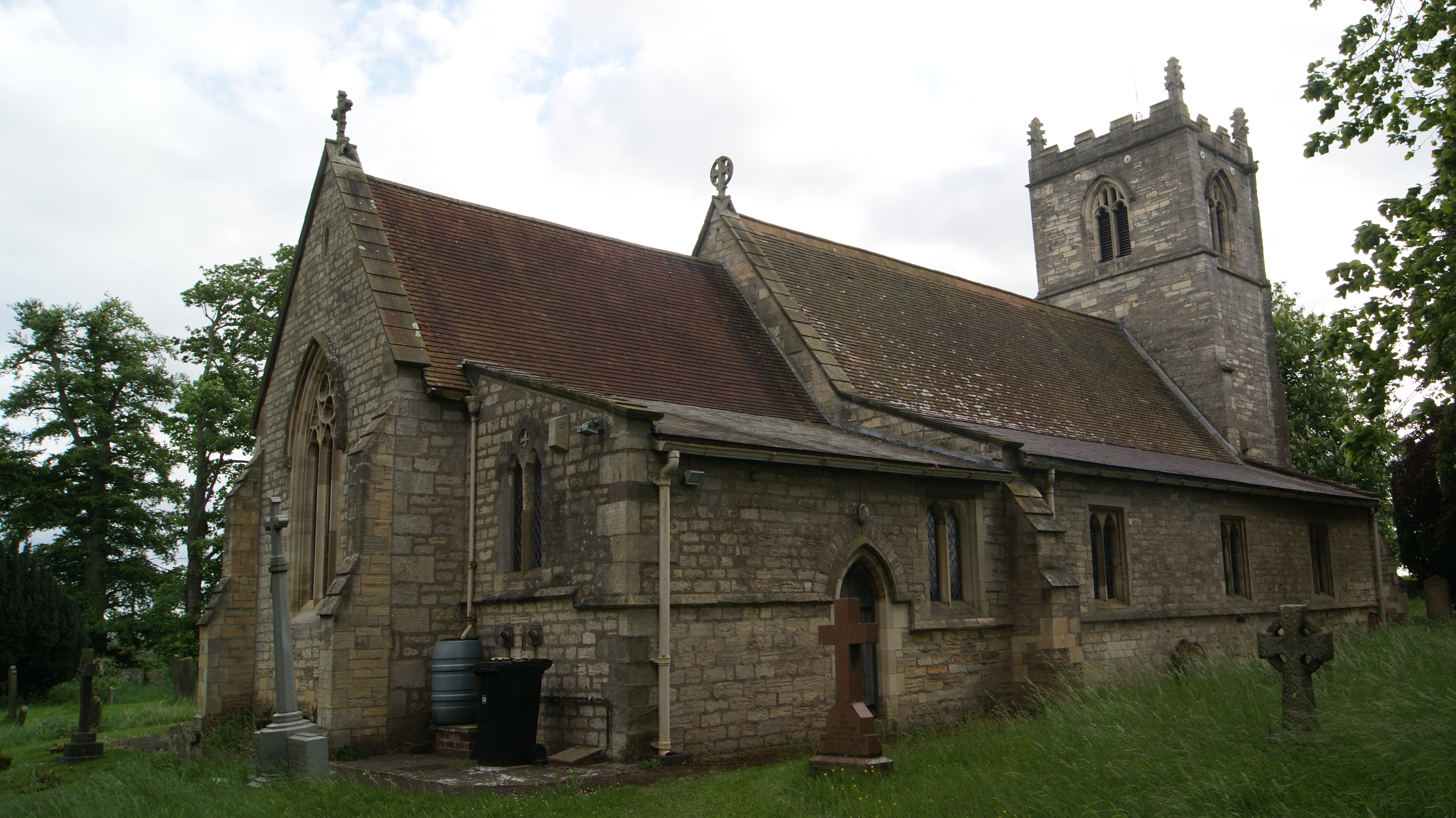
The northern and eastern elevations of the church.

The church is of dressed magnesian limestone with a red tile and Welsh slate roof. The church has a fifteenth century west tower with offset diagonal buttresses, a three light west window and large square sundial, gargoyles to the north and south with a shield beneath the parapet. The south porch is of twelfth century origin. There is a four bay nave of gothic revival style, a two bay chancel and a north vestry. The church has an ornate lychgate on the southern side of its boundaries.

== See also ==
- Listed buildings in Thorp Arch
