= Thorp Arch =

Village and civil parish in West Yorkshire, England

Coordinates: 53°54′30″N 1°20′35″W

- Village and civil parish
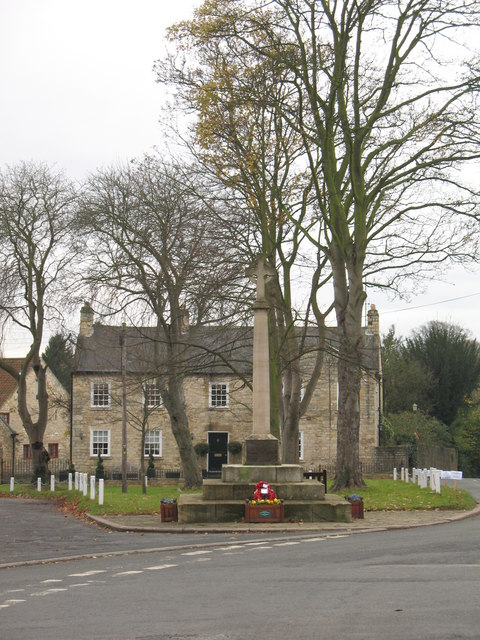
- Village green and war memorial

- Location within West Yorkshire
- Population: 1,123
- Civil parish: Thorp Arch
- Metropolitan borough: City of Leeds
- Metropolitan county: West Yorkshire
- Region: Yorkshire and the Humber
- Country: England
- Sovereign state: United Kingdom
- Post town: WETHERBY
- Postcode district: LS23
- Dialling code: 01937
- Police: West Yorkshire
- Fire: West Yorkshire
- Ambulance: Yorkshire
- UK Parliament: Elmet and Rothwell

Thorp Arch is a village and civil parish near Wetherby in the City of Leeds metropolitan borough of West Yorkshire, England.

== Governance ==
Thorp Arch is in the Wetherby ward of Leeds City Council and Elmet and Rothwell parliamentary constituency.

== Geography and amenities ==
The village is on the north bank of the River Wharfe which separates it from Boston Spa to the south. It has a primary school and public house. Historically the parish of Thorp Arch was in the Ainsty, a division of Yorkshire, separate from the ridings. It had a population of 1,123 in 2001, increasing to 1,591 at the 2011 census. The parish church of All Saints was founded in the 12th century. It has a 15th-century tower but the rest was built in 1871 and 1872. It is a Grade II listed building.

The village is adjacent to Thorp Arch Trading Estate, Wealstun Prison, and the British Library Document Supply Centre.

== Transport ==
The village railway station, now closed, was next to the trading estate on the closed Harrogate to Church Fenton Line. Current-day public transport is provided by bus route 7 to Harrogate, Wetherby and Leeds, operated by the Harrogate Bus Company.

== Sport ==
Leeds United's training ground and academy are based on Walton Road. The facility was opened in 1990 to replace one adjacent to the club's Elland Road football stadium in Leeds.

== Location grid ==
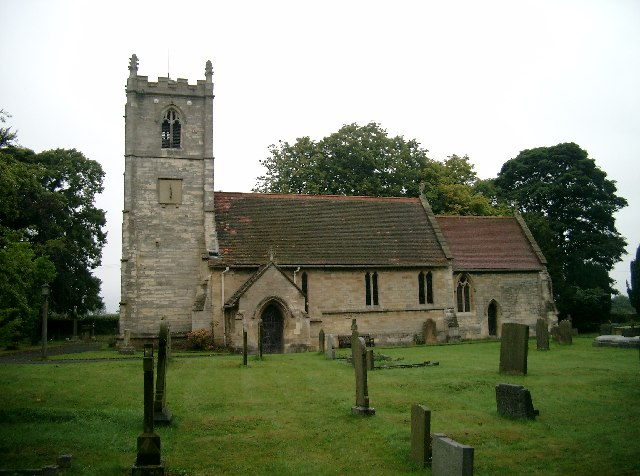
All Saints' Church, Thorp Arch

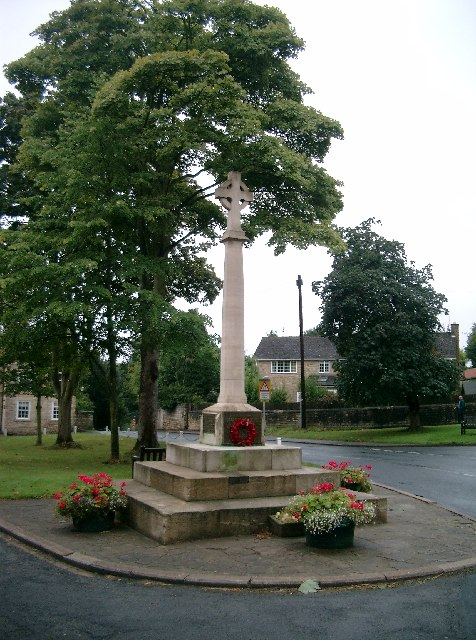
Celtic Cross

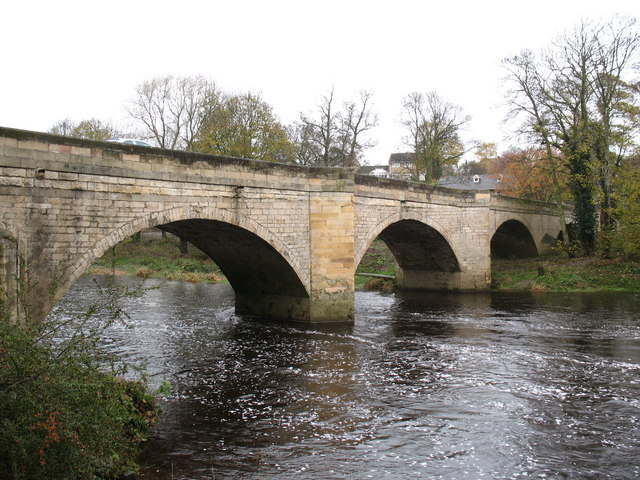
Thorp Arch Bridge

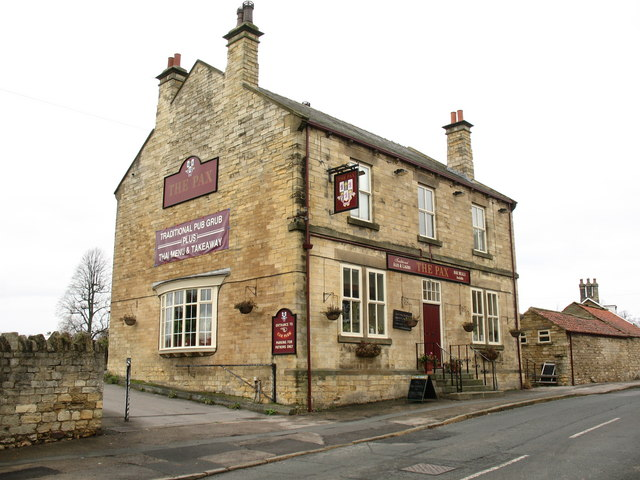
The Pax

== See also ==
- Listed buildings in Thorp Arch
