= Bramham cum Oglethorpe =

Civil parish in West Yorkshire, England

Coordinates: 53.882°N 1.3375°W

- Civil parish
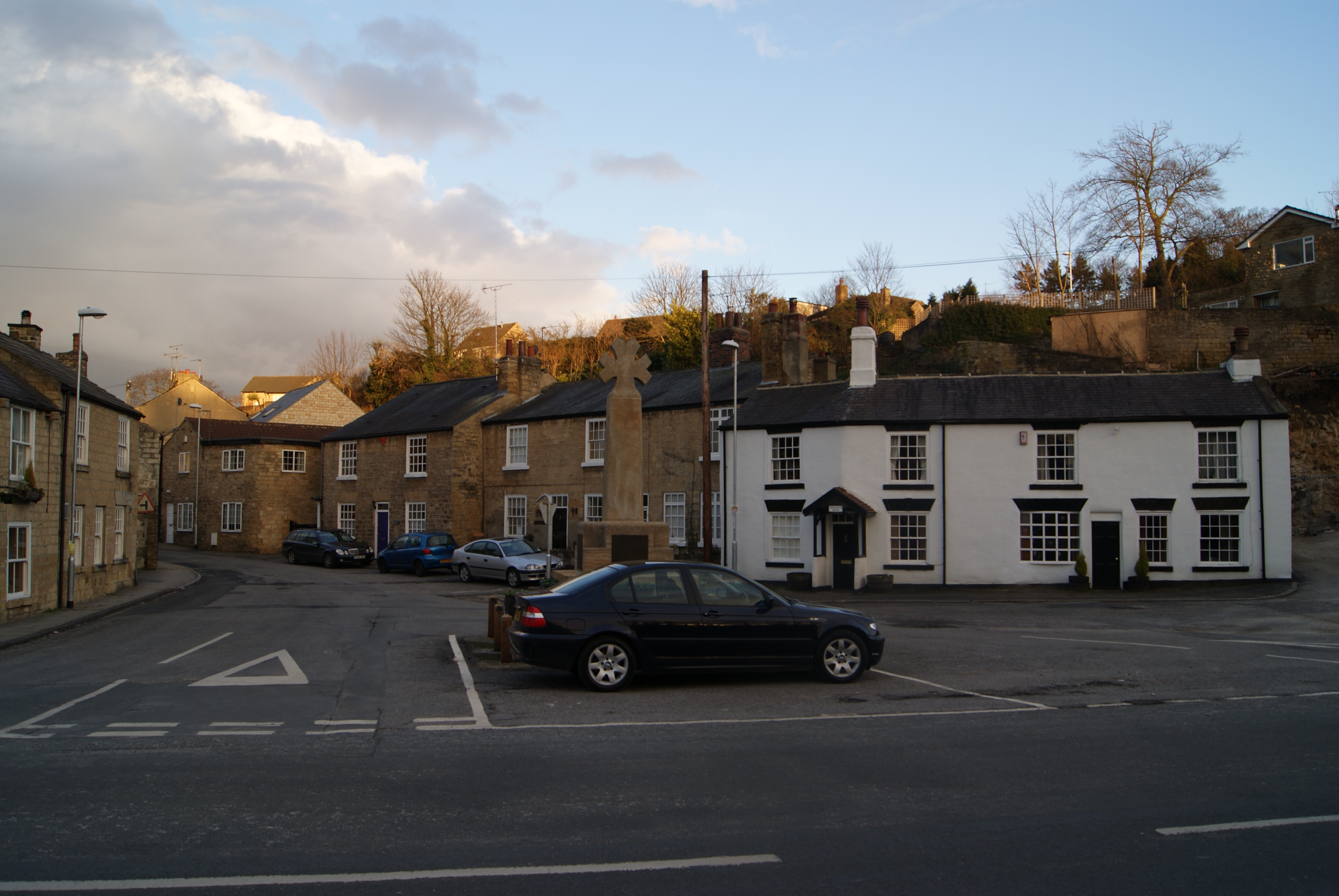
- Bramham

- Location within West Yorkshire
- Area: 19.75 km^{2} (7.63 sq mi)
- Population: 1,650 (2011 census)
  - Density: 84/km^{2} (220/sq mi)
- OS grid reference: SE435430
- Metropolitan borough: City of Leeds
- Metropolitan county: West Yorkshire
- Region: Yorkshire and the Humber
- Country: England
- Sovereign state: United Kingdom
- Main settlements: Bramham
- Post town: WETHERBY
- Postcode district: LS23
- Police: West Yorkshire
- Fire: West Yorkshire
- Ambulance: Yorkshire
- UK Parliament: Elmet and Rothwell
- Website: https://bramhamparishcouncil.gov.uk/

Bramham cum Oglethorpe is a civil parish forming part of the City of Leeds in the English county of West Yorkshire.

The main settlement in the parish is Bramham. It was a township and became a civil parish in 1866. According to the 2001 census the parish had a population of 1,715, which had fallen to 1,650 by the time of the 2011 census.

== See also ==
- Listed buildings in Bramham cum Oglethorpe
