= Music in Leeds =

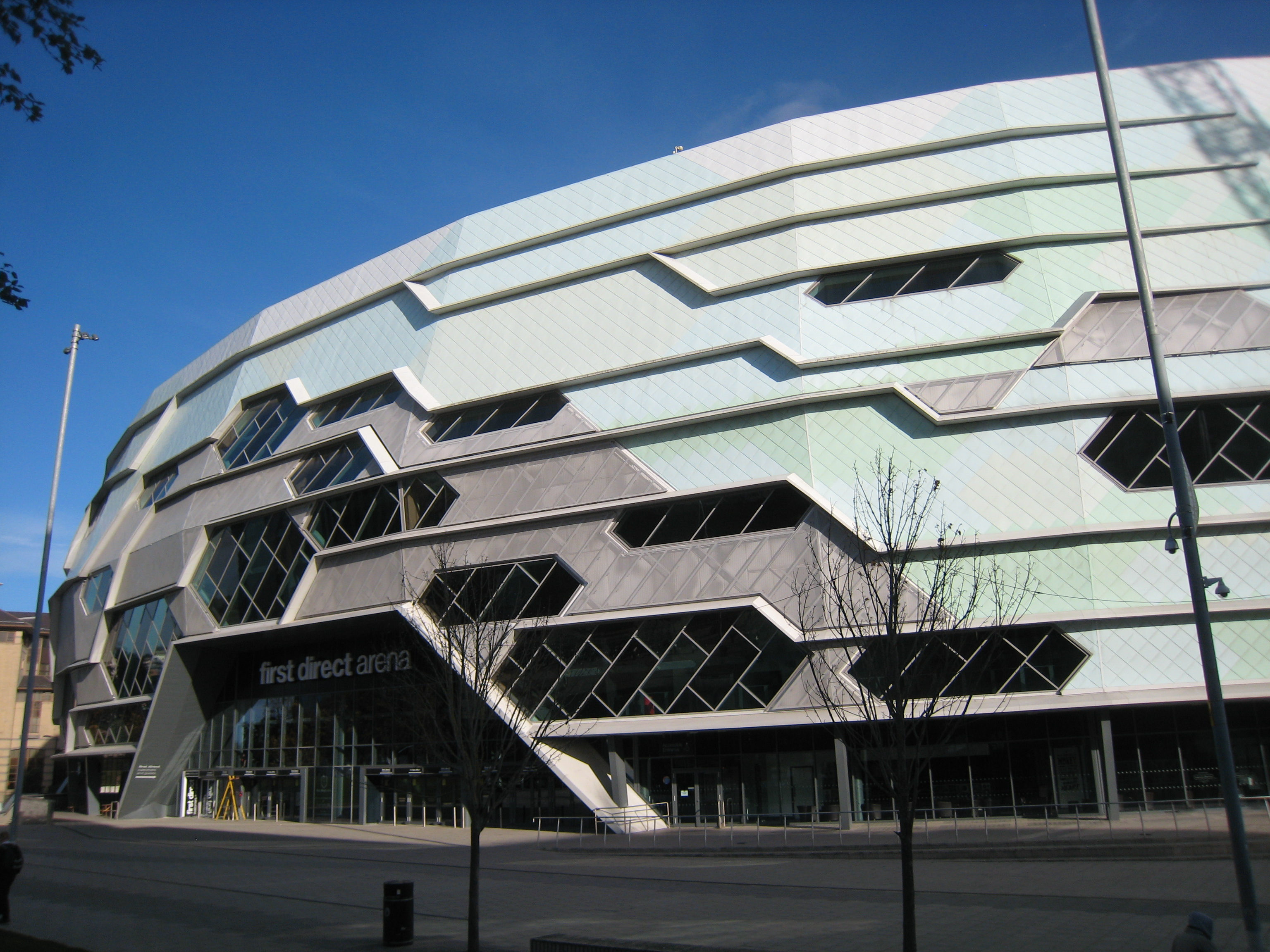
The First Direct Arena, a 13,781 capacity venue in Arena Quarter

The music in Leeds encompasses a variety of styles and genres, including rock, pop and electronic. While groups like Soft Cell, the Kaiser Chiefs, the Wedding Present, Utah Saints and the Bridewell Taxis have gained success in the mainstream, Gang of Four, the Sisters of Mercy, Chumbawamba and the Mission have helped to define genres like punk rock, gothic rock and post-punk.

In a 2018 article for the Independent, Leeds was described as "one of the best UK cities for live music", due to both major venues like the O2 Academy Leeds and First Direct Arena and grassroots venues like the Brudenell Social Club, Wharf Chambers and the Hyde Park Book Club. The city also plays host to festivals like Leeds Festival, Slam Dunk Festival, Live at Leeds and Damnation Festival.

== Electronic music and the clubbing scene ==
Chapeltown's large Afro-Caribbean population gave way to a dub scene in the 1980s. Foundational groups, Ital Rockers and Iration Steppas, began performing at Shebeens at local venues like the Leeds West Indian Community Centre using their own DIY sound systems, before influencing the opening of rave clubs and organisations like Tribe and SubDub.

Age of Chance formed in Leeds in 1983, their single "Don't Get Mad… Get Even" reached number 8 on the US Billboard Hot Dance/Club Play chart.

Although formed in Harrogate in 1991, Utah Saints were based in Leeds, heavily influenced by the sound of the Prodigy. Throughout the 1990s they had three top ten singles and another five in the top 40 on the UK Singles Chart.

International DJs and producers like Paul Woolford, Ralph Lawson and Riley & Durrant have their studios in the city, alongside less well known DJs such as Bragguar and DJ Tango.

The earlier underground house scene developed into the Leeds club scene of the 1990s, when for a while Leeds held the title of Britain's clubbing capital. Both Back to Basics and mixed gay night Vague enjoyed the title of best club in Britain at different points in the decade, whilst The Orbit club in Morley was an internationally recognised techno mecca (Orbit closed in 2003 and was replaced by a restaurant).

In the 2000s, the city's University students began making music influenced by Ital Rockers and Iration Steppas, forming groups like Submotion Orchestra and Gentleman's Dub Club. The groups would often perform by putting on parties in their student houses in Woodhouse, Hyde Park and Burley, with sofas and beds place upright against the walls for soundproofing. Performances in fields and squats were also commonplace.

== Punk rock ==
=== 1970s: Post-punk ===
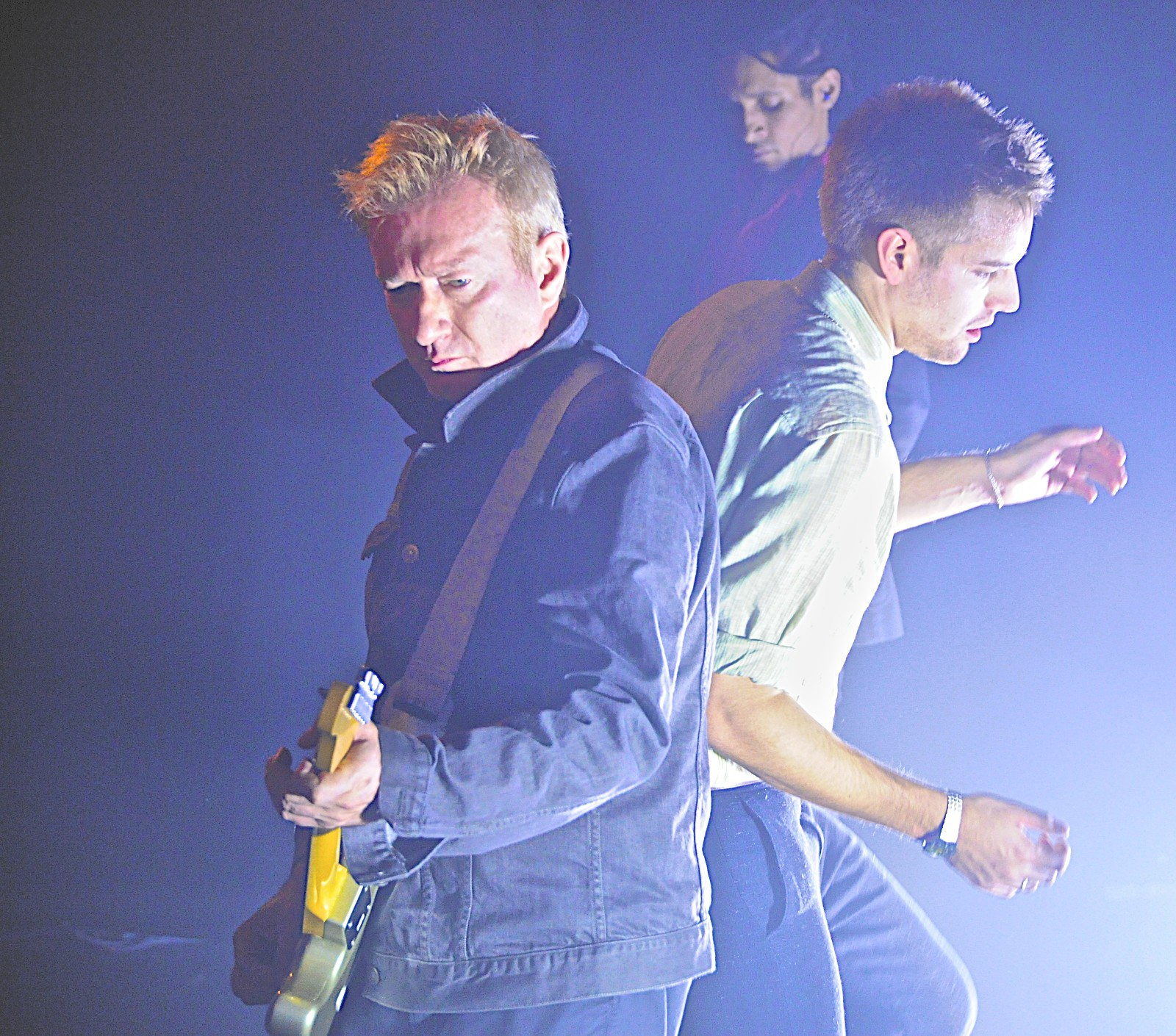
Leeds post-punk band Gang of Four performing in 2014

In the late-1970s, Leeds was home to influential punk rock groups such as The Mekons, Gang of Four and Delta 5, who helped to shape the sound of post-punk. The scene's genesis began when Andy Gill and Jon King received a funded trip to New York City in 1976. As art students, the trip happened so that the pair could study in the city's art galleries. However, while there, they became aware of the punk rock scene that had manifested itself around CBGB. After returning to Leeds, the Sex Pistols performed at Leeds Polytechnic in December. Soon after the pair formed Gang of Four. The formation of many other groups by local art students followed, for example the Mekons, Scritti Politti, the Three Johns, Girls at Our Best! and Delta 5. Pop act Soft Cell also emerged from this cohort. The members of these bands often frequented the Fenton on Blenheim Terrace, with the most frequent venue being the F Club founded by John Keenan. Groups such as the Mekons rejected being labelled as "bands", instead likening themselves to an art project espousing Marxism–Leninist politics. These groups also subverted many gender norms within the British punk scene, by attempting to include women as much as possible. Former Mekons and Delta 5 member Julz Sale said in Music in Leeds vol.2 that no woman "ever felt unequal" in the scene. During this period, members of the scene often found themselves in physical altercations against fascists, neo-Nazis and members of the National Front, leading to Leeds playing host to many Rock Against Racism concerts. In the '70s, Leeds also housed the two first openly Nazi punk bands the Dentists and the Ventz.

=== 1980s: Street and anarcho punk ===
As the aforementioned groups pushed punk rock into more experimental directions, the likes of Abrasive Wheels, The Underdogs, The Expelled and Icon A.D. pursued more aggressive and confrontational punk styles like anarcho punk, street punk and hardcore punk. Chumbawamba, who lived in a squat in Armley, emerged from this scene soon after and transformed it by bringing vegetarianism, animal rights and anti-violence values into the anarchist scene. Along with A State of Mind, Chumbawamba brought about the emergence of the term "peace punk".

=== 2000s: Post-hardcore, hardcore punk and post-punk ===
In the early–2000s, Leeds punk groups became increasingly interested in the sound of U.S. bands like Fugazi, Hot Water Music and Small Brown Bike, leading to the emergence of a more U.S.–centric sound seen through the likes of And None of Them Knew They were Robots, Fig.4.0, Dugong and Joe Ninety. Send More Paramedics formed in Leeds in 2001 by members of And None of Them Knew They were Robots. They won Zane Lowe's the 'fresh meat' competition on BBC Radio 1 show, leading to a "Guerilla Gig Live" performance on BBC Three.

In the late–2000s, a scene of hardcore punk bands manifested in the city with groups such as Mob Rules, Rot in Hell and Broken Arm. In an article for The Guardian, Mob Rules drummer Conor Rickford described the scene's nihilistic tendencies as being due to how "If you're living in Leeds you're not going to make music that says that the world is a wonderful place and the sun is always shining"

In 2010, Eagulls formed in the city, influenced by the sound of earlier Leeds post-punk band, namely Gang of Four and the Mekons.

=== 2010s: New wave of British hardcore and youth crew revival ===
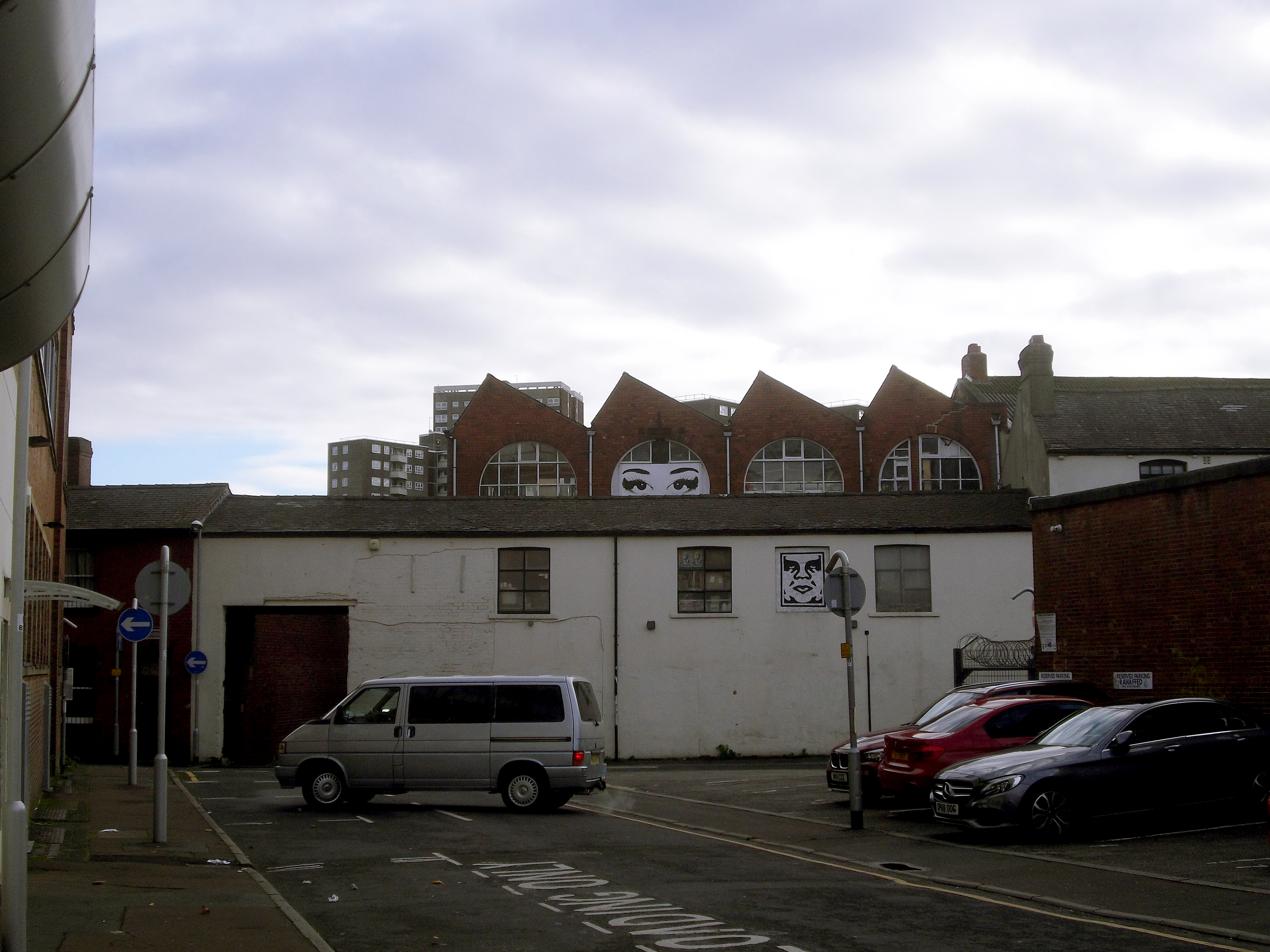
Boom, a popular venue amongst Leeds' current hardcore punk scene

Liverpool hardcore punk Violent Reaction's relocation to Leeds in the early-2010s, led to the city becoming one of the main locations for the then-emerging New Wave of British Hardcore (NWOBHC) scene. Merging elements of UK82 and oi! into the sound of hardcore, the NWOBHC continued to grow in the city, where groups like the Flex, Regiment, True Vision and Shrapnel became prominent practitioners.

The Temple of Boom (now called simply Boom) on Millwright Street quickly became the most prominent venue within this scene. Opened in 2011 by Voorhees members Ian "Lecky" Leck and Sean Walker, the venue began as a rehearsal studio, before beginning to put on performances after being pushed to by the members of the Flex. Outbreak Festival, which for much of its existence has been held at Canal Mills in Armley, is a key location for the hardcore scene, and most features local groups like Higher Power, as well as international groups like Code Orange, Turnstile and Vein.

Former Violent Reaction and Shrapnel member Jimmy Wizard formed Higher Power in 2014, with his brother Alex, which eventually grew to include additional members Louis Hardy, Max Harper and Ethan Wilkinson. Metal Hammer hailed the band as "the band redefining hardcore for a new generation", and are the second UK hardcore band to have signed to a major label, in the form of Roadrunner Records. Higher Power members Alex Wizard and Louis Hardy, Violent Reaction guitarist Tom "Razor" Hardwick and Rapture guitarist Maegan Brooks formed Big Cheese, who gained prominence in the late-2010s, along with groups like Scorned and Greed.

Leeds was one of the main locations of international 2010s youth crew revival, In the United Kingdom, producing prominent players were Rapture and Shrapnel. In 2016, Vice described Rapture, Shrapnel, True Vision and Regiment as "the Second Coming of UK Straight Edge Hardcore".

== Gothic rock ==
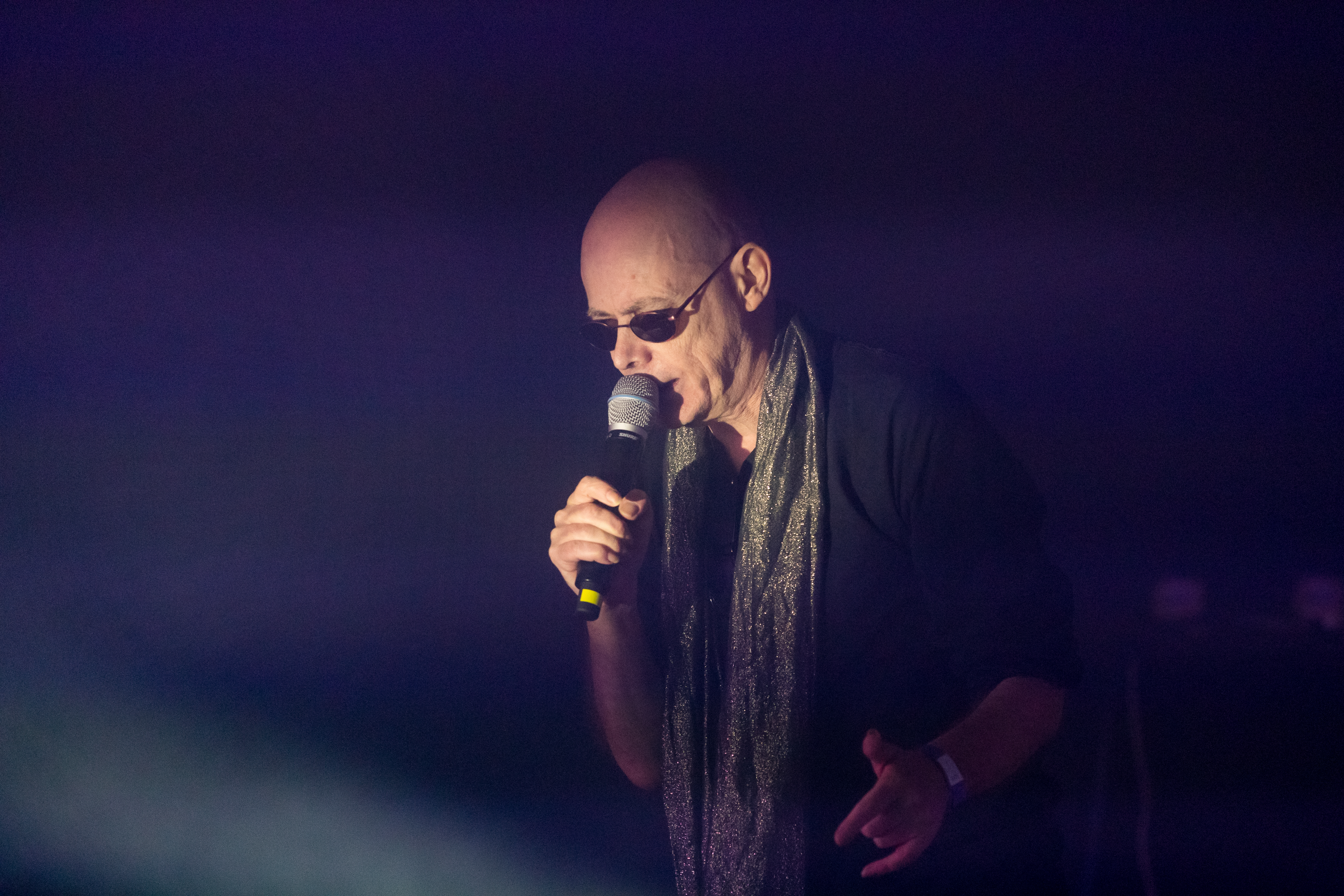
Andrew Eldritch of Leeds gothic rock band the Sisters of Mercy performing in 2019

Organiser John Keenan started Futurama Festival in 1979, which quickly became the festival for gothic rock and post-punk acts, featuring acts such as Echo & the Bunnymen, Joy Division, Cabaret Voltaire and Bauhaus. According to Dazed, the use of the word "goth" to describe the genre was coined by the Yorkshire Evening Post, in a 1983 article describing the fifth Futurama festival.

From the city's post-punk scene emerged a number of darker groups, who would come to define the sound of gothic rock, beginning in the 1980s. Leeds' gothic rock sound was distinct from the prior post-punk sounds both locally and nationally through its embrace of the traditional rock elements found in glam rock and the works of the Stooges and David Bowie, which were maligned in the post-punk scene at the time, as well as the embrace of drum machines. The scene was primarily based around the F Club, which in Karl and Beverley Spracklen's book The Evolution of Goth Culture was described as the space "where gothic rock was born in the form it is now". The founding members of the Sisters of Mercy first met at the venue in 1980, playing their debut performance there. The band proved massively influential, to the development of the genre, soon inspiring many other bands to take up a similar sound, and eventually becoming, as described by Metal Hammer writer Dave Everley, one of the closest things to a godfather of the gothic rock genre. Bradford goth band the March Violets, relocated to Leeds early on, due to its members' fascinations with groups like Gang of Four and the Mekons. While attending the University of Leeds, the band's vocalist Simon Denbigh, founded the Music for the Masses Society, beginning to book concerts and club nights throughout the city. Other groups like Southern Death Cult, The Danse Society, Salvation and Skeletal Family also formed in the area during this period.

A number of additional venues began to become associated with the scene, namely the Faversham and Le Phonographique. The Faversham is a pub on the University of Leeds campus, that became known by early fans for being frequented by the members of the goth and post-punk scenes. In the Mission: Names Are for Tombstones, Baby, Jon Langford stated that "there was a joke about the Faversham Arms that you could draw a map around all the bands in their little corners in there". Le Phonographique was a nightclub that became instrumental in the emergence of the earliest phases of the goth subculture, while it splintered from punk. According to Dazed it was the first ever goth club.

In 1985, the Sisters of Mercy members Wayne Hussey and Craig Adams departed from the band. The duo's subsequent band, also featuring Mick Brown drummer Red Lorry Yellow Lorry and Artery guitarist Simon Hinkler, made its live debut in 1986 under the name the Sisterhood. However, that same year, the Sisters of Mercy vocalist Andrew Eldritch, released a single titled "Giving Ground", under the same name. Hussey and Adams subsequently renamed their group the Mission.

Gothic club nights in Leeds continued to gain traction throughout the coming decades. For a period in the mid-2000s, the Wendy House club night at University of Leeds became the city's most frequented, however lost its popularity as the decade continued. Since the mid-to-late 2010s, the Carpe Noctum club night and Gothic city festival have become some of the most notable goth events in the city.

== Alternative rock ==
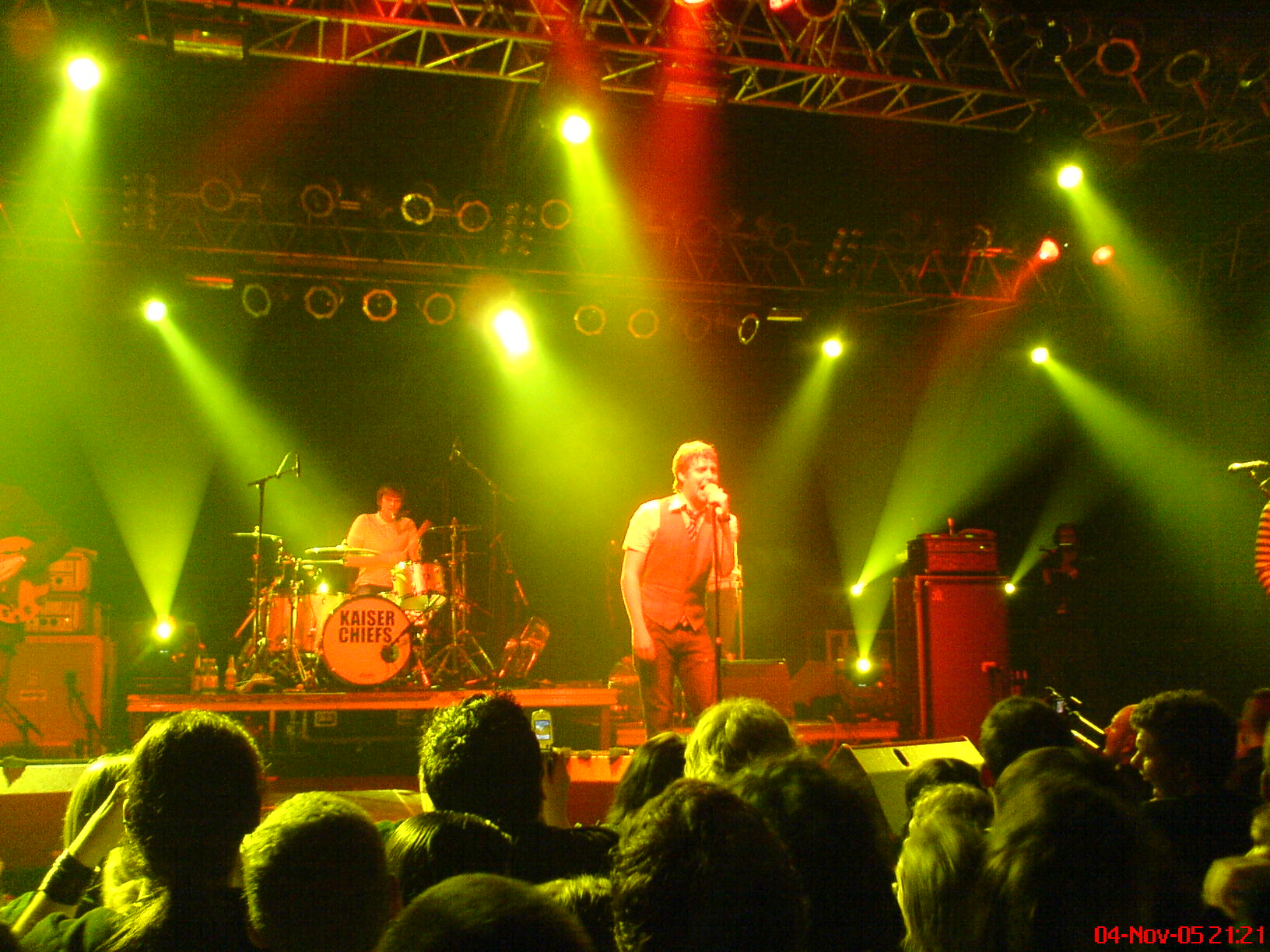
The Kaiser Chiefs

The Wedding Present formed in Leeds in 1985, in 1992, they managed to match Elvis Presley's world record of having 12 UK top 40 singles in a single year.

Cud formed in Leeds in 1987, their first recording was a 1987 Peel Session. They went onto amass three top 40 singles.

Leeds indie rock band the Bridewell Taxis formed in 1987, with their first performance being to a crowd of 600. Their 1990 single Honesty gained significant traction from publications such as NME, however its music video was eventually banned from MTV due to its depiction of the band members committing theft.

In the mid-2000s, a scene of pop-centric indie rock groups gained prominence in Leeds through bands such as the Kaiser Chiefs and the Pigeon Detectives. From within this scene, came a sub-sect of more experimental groups like ¡Forward, Russia!, Sky Larkin and This Et Al.

The Guardian credited the grunge revival of the late 2000s and 2010s to have originated in Leeds, with bands including Dinosaur Pile-Up, Pulled Apart by Horses, Old Romantic Killer Band and Wonderswan, as well as nearby groups Above Them and the Tempus. These bands adopted elements of grunge as a rejection of the locally-dominant New Yorkshire scene of clean-production indie rock. The city produced other acts in the movement including Forever Cult and Furr. The scene primarily based in Hyde Park, around venues such as the Brudenell Social Club and the Pack Horse. Two prominent groups in this scene were Dinosaur Pile-Up and Pulled Apart by Horses, who both formed out of the 2007 breakup of Mother Vulpine. Both saw significant commercial success, having performed at the Dr. Martens store in London and at Reading and Leeds Festivals. Dinosaur Pile-Ups 2015 album Eleven Eleven peaked at 169 on the UK Albums Chart.

Alt-J formed at Leeds University in 2007, in 2012 they won the Mercury Prize for their debut album An Awesome Wave.

== Pop ==
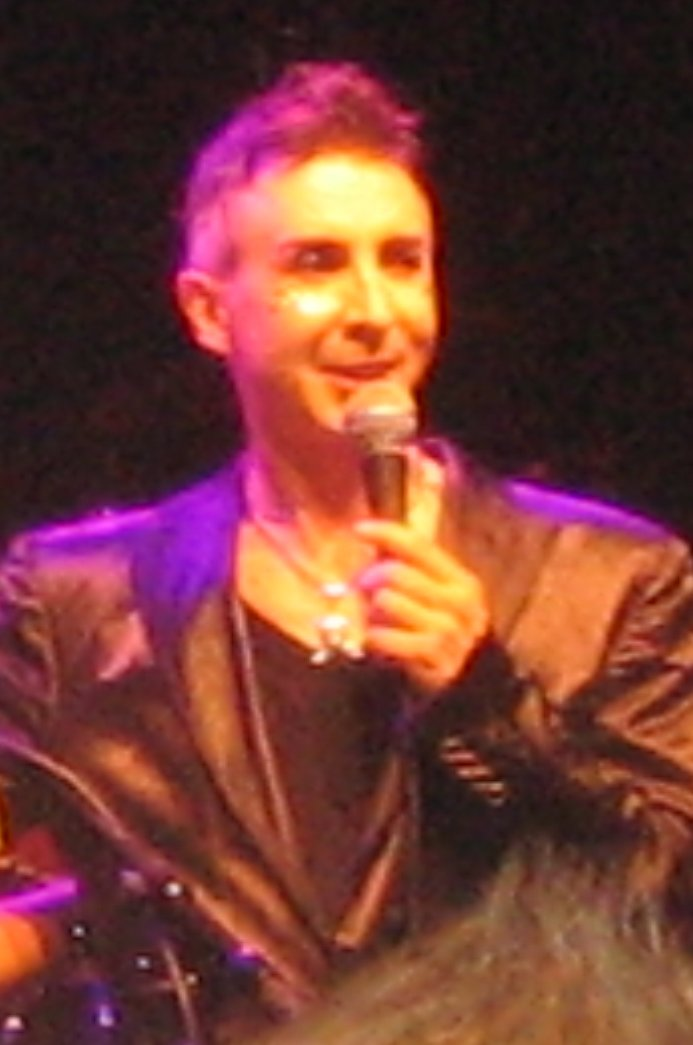
Marc Almond from Soft Cell

The Outer Limits were a psychedelic pop group that formed in Leeds in the late-1960s. By 1969, the band had disbanded, leading to vocalist Jeff Christie forming Christie. Their 1970s single Yellow River peaked at number 1 on the UK singles chart.

Soft Cell formed at Leeds Polytechnic in 1977, they have sold 10 million records worldwide, and their single Tainted Love peaked at number 1 on the UK Singles Chart.

Mel B was born in Hyde Park and grew up in Kirkstall. In 1994, she became a founding member of the Spice Girls, who would go on to be the best-selling girl group of all time.

== Festivals ==
Between 1979 and 1984 Leeds was host to the Futurama Festival, an all-day event organised by John Keenan (agent and promoter) at the Queens Hall. Over the years numerous acts played e.g.: Public Image Limited, Joy Division, Siouxsie and the Banshees, Soft Cell, Gang of Four amongst many others.

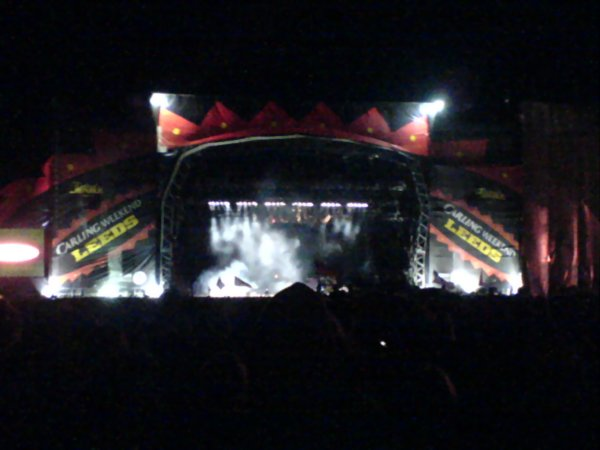
Leeds Main Stage on 25 August 2007 in-between sets by Kings of Leon and Razorlight in the carling festival

The Moor Music Festival takes place yearly in July on Addingham Moorside near Ilkley, and regularly plays host to artists from the city.

In 1996 Leeds played host to the BBC Radio 1 Sound City festival.

Leeds initially played host to the northern leg of the V festival between 1996 and 1998 before the event moved to Weston Park, Staffordshire.

In 2000, Leeds played host to the first-ever Radio 1 Love Parade at Roundhay Park.

Since 1999 the Leeds Festival, a northern leg of the well established Reading Festival, has taken place on August bank holiday weekend. The event was initially held at Temple Newsam (the venue for the Leeds V Festival) before protests from residents forced a move to Bramham Park.

Leeds is also home to the Leeds International Pianoforte Competition which is regarded highly. It was established in 1963 by Fanny Waterman with the 15th competition starting in September 2006.

Leeds Lieder was established in 2004, and holds a yearly classical music festival at Leeds College of Music as a platform for Lieder and other forms of art song.

West Yorkshire Playhouse (along with several other smaller venues) holds the annual Fuseleeds festival showcasing an eclectic mix of more left-field music.

In 2006 and 2007 the two-day Wireless Festival took place at Harewood House. Leeds band Kaiser Chiefs headlined the festival in 2007.

Live at Leeds is an annual multi-venue festival that takes place each May. The first Live At Leeds event took place in May 2007 to coincide with the city's 800th birthday celebrations.

Each May Leeds has the Slam Dunk festival, which is a festival that encompasses the genres of Emo, Pop-Punk, Ska-Punk and Rock.

Outbreak Festival, originally held in Sheffield, is a festival specialising in hardcore punk. For much of its existence, it has been held at Canal Mills in Armley.

The Pie Race festival started by Leeds Punk band ACiD DROP in 2010 takes place every November with underground Punk, Ska and Hardcore

In 2017, the first Hive Festival by Live in the Hive was held at Hyde Park Book Club. In 2018, a follow-up festival in conjunction with Gateway Church was held, featuring a diverse range of acts who have all featured on Leeds' based Live in the Hive sessions.

== Venues ==
Leeds plays host to many venues, currently including: University of Leeds Refectory, where The Who performed and recorded their Valentine's Day, 1970 live album Live at Leeds; Leeds Beckett University; Brudenell Social Club; The Faversham; The Hi-Fi club; The Well; The Wardrobe; The Leeds Irish Centre; New Roscoe (now closed); The Cardigan Arms; The Fenton; and The Packhorse, among others.

The O2 Academy Leeds opened in October 2008 on the site of the former Town & County Club music venue. The 2,300 capacity venue is run by the Academy Music Group and follows in-line with their other music venues around the UK.

The Duchess of York was situated at 71 Vicar Lane in the city centre of Leeds, arguably the busiest music venue during its tenure, was not mentioned with honour. It was gutted by Hugo Boss, silencing a major music venue and turning this historic musical landmark in the great North of England into a boutique. There were two to three live bands performing there, seven nights a week for almost the entirety of its existence. Bands/acts such as Nick Harper, U2, Nirvana, Oasis, Cud, Blur, Radiohead, Manic Street Preachers, Green Day, Chumbawamba, Steve Marriott, the Grandmothers of Invention, Barrie Gledden, Bleach, Pavement, Isaac Guillory, Dumpy's Rusty Nuts, Pulp, Coldplay, Little Chief, Mick Taylor of The Rolling Stones, Ship of Fools, Stereophonics, The Wedding Present and many more.

Occasional gigs are held in Millennium Square in the city centre (including the Kaiser Chiefs in 2006), Roundhay Park (which was home to Love Parade in 2000 and has hosted gigs by Madonna, U2, Robbie Williams, Michael Jackson and The Rolling Stones), Harewood House, Leeds Town Hall, Leeds Holy Trinity Church and Leeds Parish Church. The city centre itself has a musical heritage of its own, with several bands, such as Collectors Club, choosing to set music videos there.

The First Direct Arena (also known as the Leeds Arena) is a 13,500 capacity entertainment focused arena located in the Arena Quarter hosting major international entertainment acts.

In September 2014, The Cockpit announced it would be closing permanently after 20 years in existence, leading to the opening of the Key Club, which continued to host all of its club nights, in addition to hosting bands such as Fit for an Autopsy, Blood Youth, Cancer Bats, Beartooth, Frank Carter and the Rattlesnakes, Idles and The Wonder Years.

Wharf Chambers (formerly the Common Place) is a venue and worker cooperative located on Wharf Street that specialises in punk rock concerts. While called the Common Place, focused on radical left wing activism and anti-Capitalist politics and held free English lessons for refugees and asylum seekers.

[Boom] (formerly the Temple of Boom) is a venue established in 2011 in Byron Street Mills, specialising in punk rock and heavy metal. It has three stages, a vegan cafe, ten rehearsal rooms, Declared Sound recording studio, a band hostel, a brewery, a wrestling ring and hosts the webstore for Southern Records. It has hosted musicians such as Madball, Slowthai, Voivod, and Wormrot. In 2019, it was brought in parliament, being described as "an irreplaceable jewel in the crown of Leeds music and cultural scene", which gained it 26 signatures to avoid its possible eviction from the premises. The venue began as a rehearsal in 2009, however soon after when the Flex inquired into whether they could perform there, leading to multiple stages and performance areas being built on the premises. The venue was also the filming location of an episode of DCI Banks. In November 2020, the Music Venue Trust including it on its list of 30 venues facing permanent closure as a result of the COVID-19 pandemic.

The Bellgrave Music Hall is a music venue and eatery on Cross Bellgrave Street. Its first floor venue room has a capacity of 300 and has hosted performances from acts such as Royal Blood, the Fall and Jorja Smith.

Chunk is a venue and worker cooperative specialising in punk rock and DIY culture. It also includes the feminist dance music venue Slut Drop. Beginning as a rehearsal studio in 2013, on the former premises of 309 Studios, Chunk grew to include the record label Voice of Chunk and spaces for graphic design, photography and event promotion.

Oporto is a bar and music venue specialising in indie rock, located on Call Lane that has hosted acts such as Viola Beach, Dutch Uncles. Its Gaslight Club night hosted free performances from up and coming musicians.

== See also ==
- List of bands originating in Leeds
- New Yorkshire
- Bands and musicians from Yorkshire and North East England
