= Futurama Festival =

Former music festival held in the United Kingdom

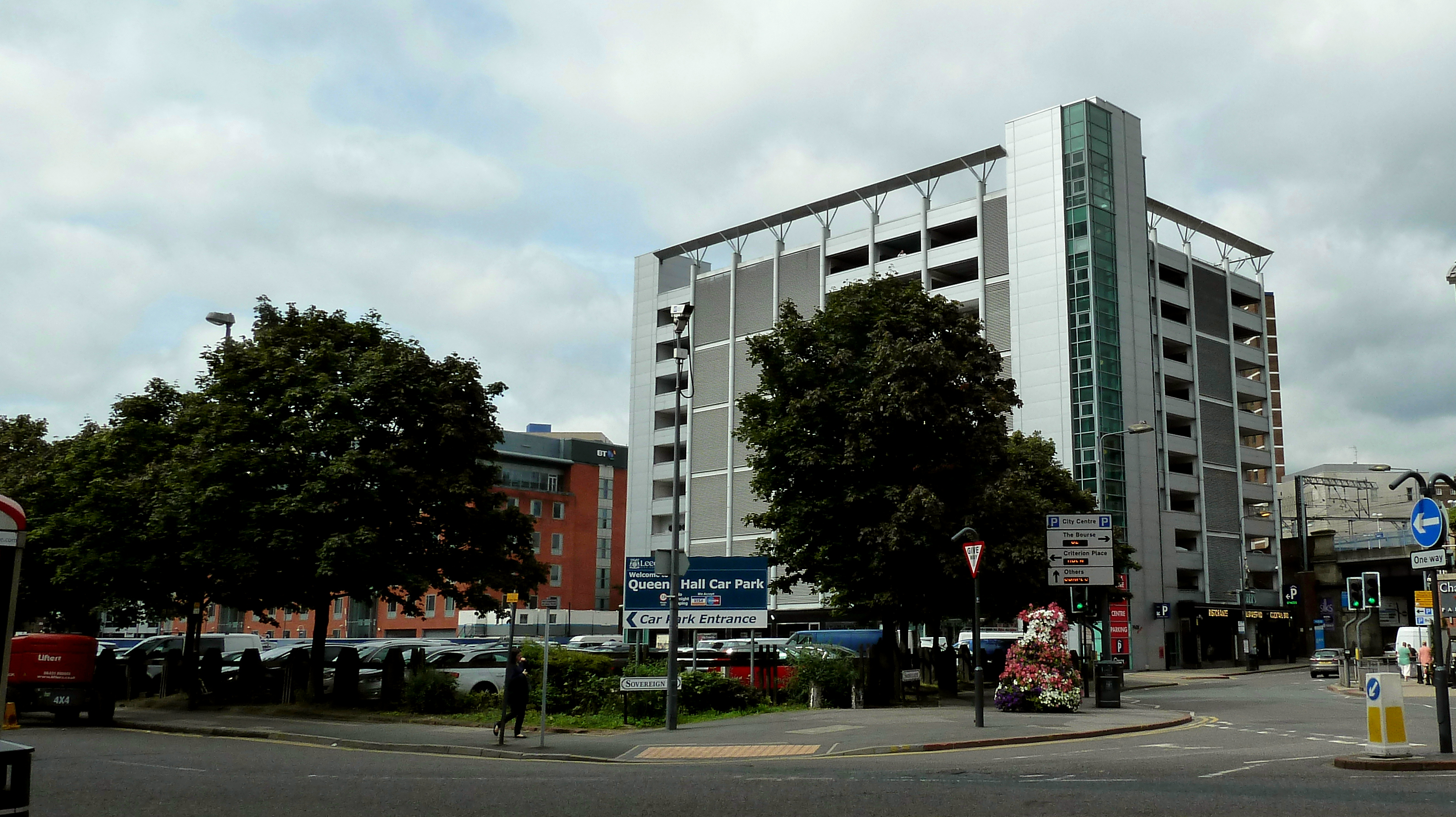
19 Swinegate, Leeds, the former site of Queens Hall where Futurama was held in 1979, 1980 and 1983

Futurama Festival was an annual post-punk and gothic rock festival held at venues in Leeds, Stafford and Queensferry between 1979 and 1983. A sixth edition was held in 1989. It aimed for a relaunch in 2021 but, after being postponed, was forced to cancel as a result of the continuing COVID-19 pandemic in the United Kingdom.

== Festival ==
At the end of the 1970s, promoter John Keenan was running an event called F Club in Leeds and decided to put on the Futurama festival at the Queens Hall on 8 and 9 September 1979, billing it as the "World's First Science-Fiction Music Festival". The lineup included A Certain Ratio, Cabaret Voltaire, Echo and the Bunnymen, the Fall, Joy Division, Orchestral Manoeuvres in the Dark, Public Image Ltd and The Teardrop Explodes. Overall, half the 30 post-punk bands on the lineup came from the four cities of Leeds, Liverpool, Manchester and Sheffield. Mike Badger (later of The La's) hitchhiked from Liverpool and recalled the crowd being composed of glue sniffing punks. Stan Erraught of The Stars of Heaven wrote that "Joy Division were a revelation, obviously, but the abiding memory is of seeing The Fall for the first of many times".

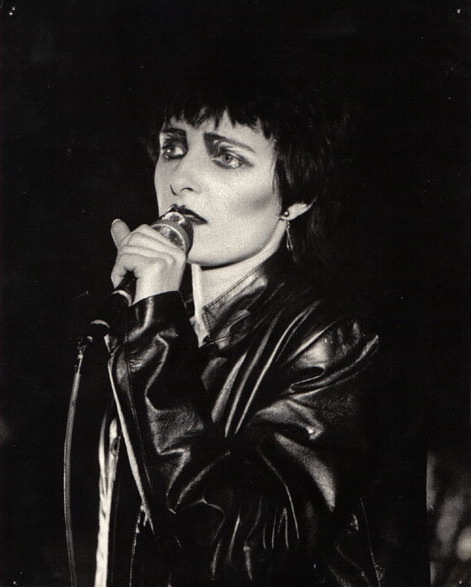
Siouxsie Sioux from Siouxsie and the Banshees performing in 1980

At Futurama 2 in 1980, the bands at the Queens Hall included Clock DVA, Echo and the Bunnymen and The Durutti Column. The Virgin Prunes performed wearing loincloths with pigs' heads on their crotches. Siouxsie and the Banshees headlined, with Soft Cell early on the bill. Keyboardist Dave Ball from Soft Cell saw John Peel in the audience and gave him a copy of their first EP, Mutant Moments. After Peel played it on his radio show, they were signed to Some Bizzare Records. Reviews of the event in NME were mixed, with one writeup calling it "Castle Donington for the angst-rock brigade".

The following year, Futurama 3 was held at the Bingley Hall, Stafford, with Bauhaus, Theatre of Hate, UK Decay and The Sisters of Mercy playing. Futurama 4 was held in 1982 at the Deeside Leisure Centre, a sports centre at Queensferry in northern Wales. It hosted Danse Society, Dead or Alive, March Violets, Gene Loves Jezebel, Sex Gang Children and Southern Death Cult. Futurama 5 ended the run of events in 1983 back at the Queens Hall, with a lineup of goth and punk bands including the New Model Army. According to Dazed, the use of the word "goth" to describe the genre was coined by the Yorkshire Evening Post, in an article describing the fifth festival. A sixth Futurama was put on by Keenan at the Bradford Alhambra in 1989.

== Relaunch ==
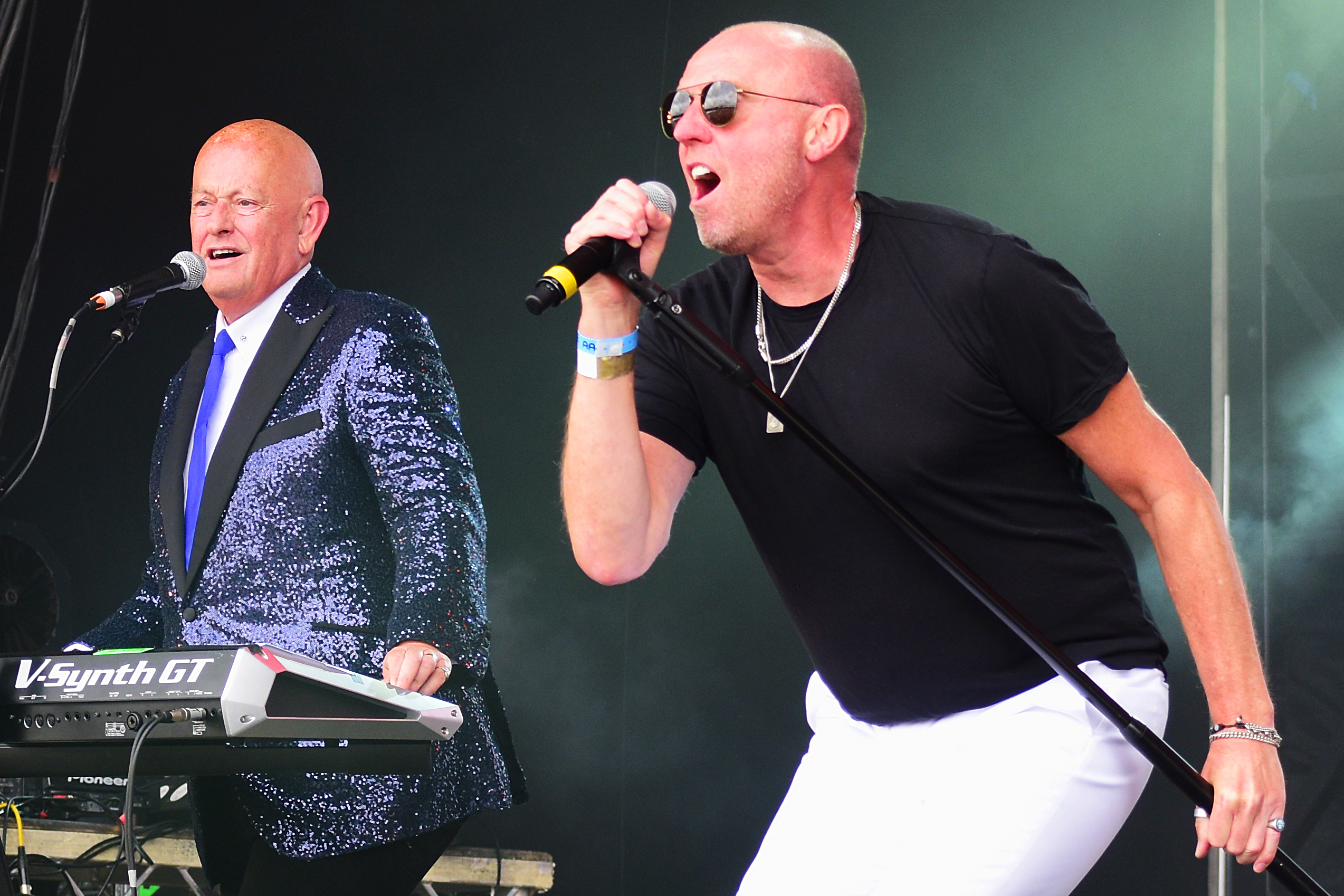
Heaven 17 performing in 2021

In 2020, it was announced that Futurama would return in April the following year as a two day festival in Liverpool, at the Invisible Wind Factory. Heaven 17 and Peter Hook and The Light were the headline acts. As a result of the COVID-19 pandemic, the festival was first postponed to September 2021 and then April 2022; since Heaven 17 could no longer headline they were replaced by New Model Army. In early 2022, it was announced that the festival was not going ahead.
