= Chubby and the Gang =

English rock band formed in 2019

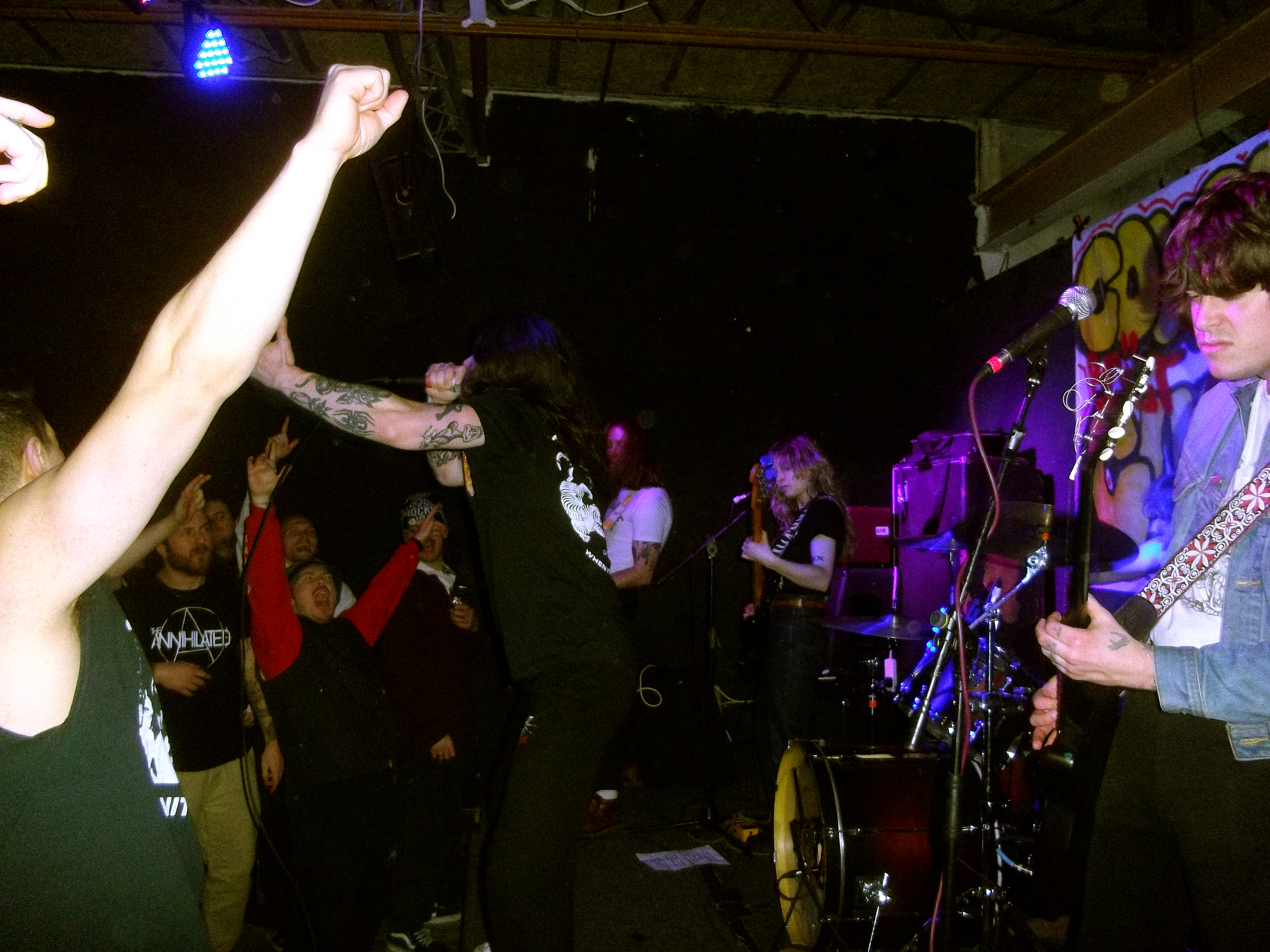
- Chubby and the Gang performing in 2022

Background information
- Origin: London, England
- Genres: Punk rock; pub rock; rock and roll
- Years active: 2019–2025
- Labels: Partisan, Static Shock
- Spinoffs: The Chisel
- Spinoff of: Arms Race; Big Cheese
- Members: Charlie Manning-Walker; Will Goodey; Geoff Wilcox; Lee Munday; Charlie Wyatt
- Past members: Luke Austin; Ethan Stahl; Tom Hardwick; Meg Mills; Joe McMahon
- Website: www.chubbyandthegang.com

Chubby and the Gang was an English rock band from West London, formed in 2019. Initially comprising vocalist Charlie "Chubby Charles" Manning-Walker, guitarists Ethan Stahl and Tom "Razor" Hardwick, bassist Meg Mills, and drummer Joe McMahon, the group emerged from the UK's hardcore punk scene. Members previously played in bands including Arms Race, Vile Spirit, and Gutter Knife.

== History ==
Charlie "Chubby" Manning-Walker first became involved in the British hardcore punk scene in 2004, at the age of 15. By the 2010s, he was active in the New Wave of British Hardcore movement, playing in bands such as Violent Reaction and Arms Race. During this period, he met members of the Brighton bands Vile Spirit and Gutter Knife, with whom he would later form Chubby and the Gang.

In 2019, the band entered the studio to record their debut album, Speed Kills, with producer Jonah Falco of Fucked Up. In January 2020, they toured the United States twice, supporting Royal Hounds and later Hank Wood and the Hammerheads, during which Speed Kills was released through Static Shock Records. Although it had been intended for release prior to the tours, production delays postponed it.

In March 2020, Chubby and the Gang were announced as part of the lineup for the 2021 2000trees festival. That same year, Luke Austin was replaced by Meg Mills on bass. The band then returned to the studio to work on their second album, spending ten days on recording sessions—a more deliberate approach than on their debut.

On 8 October 2020, they premiered the single "Union Dues," and released a music video for "All Along the Uxbridge Road," a track from Speed Kills. On 10 October 2020, they announced their debut headlining show at Bush Hall, London, scheduled for 15 May 2021.

On 19 November 2020, they were confirmed to perform at the 2021 Great Escape Festival. On 20 November, Speed Kills was re-released through Partisan Records.

On 14 April 2021, they released the single "Lightning Don't Strike Twice," followed by "Life's Lemons" on 28 May. On 15 June, both songs were confirmed to appear on the band's second album, The Mutt's Nuts, which was released on 21 August 2021.

Between 29 February and 5 March 2022, Chubby and the Gang supported Turnstile on their UK headline tour. On 14 February 2022, they released a three-track EP titled Labour of Love.

On 14 December 2022, the band released the double single Chubby and the Gang Presents: A Christmas Extravaganza, featuring "Red Rag to a Bull" and "Violent Night (A Christmas Tale)." This release coincided with the announcement that Manning-Walker would continue the band with a new lineup: bassist Geoff Wilcox, guitarists Will Goodey and Charlie Wyatt, and drummer Lee Munday.

On 31 March 2025, the band announced they have split up.

== Musical style ==
The band has been described as punk rock, rock and roll, and pub rock. Their music incorporates elements of surf rock, classic pop, hardcore punk, doo wop, blues, oi!, power pop, street punk, and glam rock. Their songs typically feature high tempos and a strong emphasis on hooks. Many of the band's lyrics reflect the members' left-wing politics, addressing themes such as trade unionism, police brutality, and working-class pride.

In an article for Rolling Stone, their debut album Speed Kills was described as "all buzzsaw riffs and drums that barrel forward like an 18-wheeler twisting around a cliff-edge switchback at top speed. But the tension between mayhem and heart, fury and fun, is always there." Vice writer Jak Hutchcraft compared their sound to "the punk rock earworms of Rudi, the footy terrace chants of Blitz, the garage spirit of Royal Headache, and the honest pub rock of Coloured Balls." A writer for The Guardian described their style as fusing "the evolution of punk – a pinch of pub rock, its anarchic 1977 heyday, a dose of 100mph hardcore – and fuses it all together to create something a bit like what the immortal Ramones might have sounded like if they’d hung out on west London’s Uxbridge Road and not CBGB in New York City." Clash magazine characterized their music as "built on a world-class rhythm section that’s forever moments from collapse." Stereogum described the album’s title track as "a sloppy drunk goof, an intensely fast stumbling ripper that has fun with itself as it rocks out."

The band has cited influences including the Ramones, Dr. Feelgood, Coloured Balls, and Iron Virgin. Regarding the band's eclectic sound, Manning-Walker stated: "I wanted to put in an organ, a handclap, a harmonica, a tambourine, and the quick element comes from me only experiencing hardcore for 15 years. Because of where I come from, it all ended up being 200mph." Their recordings also frequently feature vocal samples from television series and films, such as The Jimmie Rodgers Show.

== Members ==
Current

- Charlie "Chubby Charles" Manning-Walker – lead vocals, harmonica (2019–2025)
- Will Goodey – guitar (2022–2025)
- Charlie Wyatt – guitar (2023–2025)
- Geoff Wilcox – bass (2022–2025)
- Lee Munday – drums (2022–2025)

Former

- Luke Austin – bass (2019–2020)
- Ethan Stahl – guitar (2019–2022)
- Tom "Razor" Hardwick – guitar (2019–2022)
- Joe McMahon – drums (2019–2022)
- Meg Mills – bass (2020–2022)

== Discography ==
=== Studio albums ===
- Speed Kills (2020)
- The Mutt's Nuts (2021)
- And Then There Was... (2024)

=== EPs ===
- Labour of Love (2022)

=== Singles ===
- "Union Dues" (2020)
- "Lightning Don't Strike Twice" (2021)
- "Life's Lemons" (2021)
- "Coming Up Tough" (2021)
- Chubby and the Gang Presents: A Christmas Extravaganza (2022)

=== Music videos ===
List of music videos as lead artist, showing year released and directors
Title	Year	Director(s)			
"All Along the Uxbridge Road"	2020	Lluis Fuzzhound	Title	Year	Director(s)
"Coming Up Tough"	2021	Pedro Takahashi			
