= Heaven Is Waiting =

Studio album by the Danse Society
- Released: January 1984
- Recorded: October and December 1983 at Britannia Row Studios, London, England
- Genres: Gothic rock, post-punk, dark wave, synth-pop
- Labels: Arista, Society
- Producers: Kingbird, Nigel Gray

The Danse Society chronology
Seduction (1982)	Heaven Is Waiting (1984)	Looking Through (1986)

Heaven Is Waiting is the second studio album by English gothic rock band the Danse Society. It was released in January 1984 jointly by record labels Arista.

== Track listing ==
All tracks are written by The Danse Society (Paul Gilmartin, Paul Nash, Steve Rawlings, Lyndon Scarfe, Tim Wright), except "2000 Light Years from Home", written by Mick Jagger and Keith Richards.

Side A
No.	Title	Length
1.	"Come Inside"	8:35
2.	"Wake Up"	4:53
3.	"Angel"	4:43
4.	"Where Are You Now"	4:12
5.	"Red Light (Shine)"	2:50

Side B
No.	Title	Length
1.	"Heaven Is Waiting"	3:41
2.	"The Hurt"	3:50
3.	"2000 Light Years from Home" (The Rolling Stones cover)	3:55
4.	"Valiant to Vile"	3:30
5.	"The Night"	6:21

== Release ==
Heaven Is Waiting reached No. 39 in the UK Albums Chart, the highest chart placing of any of their albums.

== Critical reception ==
Professional ratings
Review scores
Source	Rating
AllMusic	2.5/5 stars

Heaven Is Waiting has been poorly received by professional critics. Trouser Press called the album "further plodding nonsense". AllMusic wrote, "Heavy on gloomy atmosphere [...] but short on memorable songs, Heaven Is Waiting failed to deliver on the promise Danse Society displayed early in their career", though commenting that the album "isn't without interest."

== Personnel ==
The Danse Society

- Paul Gilmartin – drums
- Paul Nash – guitar
- Steve Rawlings – vocals
- Lyndon Scarfe – keyboards
- Tim Wright – bass guitar

Technical

- Kingbird – production on tracks A1, A2, A5, B3 and B5, mixing on tracks A1, A5, B3 and B5
- Nigel Gray – production on tracks A3, A4, B1, B2 and B4
- Ian Caple – engineering on tracks A1, A5, B3 and B5
- Phil Thornalley – engineering on track A2
- Will Gosling – mixing on tracks A1, A3–A5 and B1–B5
- P. Swift – sleeve design
- Vaughan Arnell – sleeve design
