= 27 Miles Underwater =

Studio album by Higher Power
- Released: 24 January 2020
- Genres: Alternative rock; hardcore punk; alternative metal
- Length: 34:18
- Label: Roadrunner
- Producer: Gil Norton

Higher Power chronology
Soul Structure (2017)	27 Miles Underwater (2020)	There's Love in This World if You Want It (2025)

Singles from 27 Miles Underwater
- 1. "Seamless" Released: 6 September 2019; 2. "Low Season" Released: 8 November 2019; 3. "Lost In Static" Released: 17 January 2020; 4. "Rewire (101)" Released: 27 May 2020

27 Miles Underwater is the second studio album by British hardcore punk band Higher Power. The album was released on 24 January 2020 through Roadrunner Records.

== Composition ==
The album has been described as alternative rock, hardcore punk and alternative metal. Pitchfork called it "the most 1995 rock album of 2020", and as treating "'90s alt-rock with the reverence usually afforded to classic rock". On the album, vocalist Jimmy Wizard makes use of both screaming and "airy melodies", emphasising his dark lyrical style. Brooklyn Vegan called it "the first great rock album of 2020". In an article for Discovered Magazine, writer Matty Williamson praised the album for expanding the band's sound to include pop music sensibilities, while still retaining their prior hardcore punk sound.

== Promotion ==
The band embarked on their first tour as a headlining act in promotion of the album. The first leg of the tour was in the United States from 20 January 2020 through 10 February 2020. The band opened for Beartooth for their Disease Tour from 16 February to 6 March 2020 by playing shows in the United Kingdom and Europe.

The band was to resume touring with the Knotfest at Sea cruise ship music festival which was to be held from 10–14 August 2020 on a cruise from Barcelona, Spain to Naples, Italy. In May 2020 the event was postponed to August 2021 due to the ongoing COVID-19 pandemic, before being indefinitely postponed in July 2020.

On 1 September 2020, it was announced that Higher Power would play at Outbreak Fest 2021 which will be held from 25–27 June 2021 at the Bowlers Exhibition Centre in Manchester, United Kingdom.

=== Shows ===
List of concerts, showing date, city, country, venue, and supporting acts
Date	City	Country	Venue	Supporting act(s)
United States
20 January 2020	Phoenix	United States	Nile Underground	Take Offense, Drain, Life's Question
21 January 2020	Las Vegas	United States	American Legion Post 8	Take Offense, Drain, Life's Question
22 January 2020	Los Angeles	United States	The Echo	Take Offense, Drain, Life's Question
23 January 2020	Anaheim	United States	Chain Reaction	Take Offense, Drain, Life's Question
24 January 2020	Sacramento	United States	The Colony	Take Offense, Drain, Life's Question
25 January 2020	Portland	United States	Post 134	Take Offense, Drain, Life's Question
26 January 2020	Seattle	United States	Vera Project	Take Offense, Drain, Life's Question
28 January 2020	San Jose	United States	The Ritz	Take Offense, Drain, Life's Question
1 February 2020	Dallas	United States	Ridglea	N/A
3 February 2020	New Orleans	United States	Gasa Gasa	N/A
4 February 2020	Atlanta	United States	The Bakery	N/A
5 February 2020	Nashville	United States	DRKMTTR	N/A
6 February 2020	Louisville	United States	LDB	N/A
7 February 2020	Baltimore	United States	Ottobar	N/A
8 February 2020	New York City	United States	Union Pool	N/A
9 February 2020	Philadelphia	United States	Creep Records	N/A
United Kingdom & Europe
16 February 2020	Stuttgart	Germany	LKA Longhorn	Beartooth; The Amity Affliction
17 February 2020	Vienna	Austria		Beartooth; The Amity Affliction
19 February 2020	Solothurn	Switzerland		Beartooth; The Amity Affliction
20 February 2020	Munich	Germany		Beartooth; The Amity Affliction
21 February 2020	Oberhausen	Germany		Beartooth; The Amity Affliction
22 February 2020	Wiesbaden	Germany		Beartooth; The Amity Affliction
24 February 2020	Bristol	United Kingdom		Beartooth; The Amity Affliction
25 February 2020	Glasgow	United Kingdom		Beartooth; The Amity Affliction
26 February 2020	Nottingham	United Kingdom		Beartooth; The Amity Affliction
28 February 2020	Manchester	United Kingdom		Beartooth; The Amity Affliction
29 February 2020	London	United Kingdom		Beartooth; The Amity Affliction
1 March 2020	Antwerp	Belgium		Beartooth; The Amity Affliction
3 March 2020	Amsterdam	Netherlands		Beartooth; The Amity Affliction
4 March 2020	Hamburg	Germany		Beartooth; The Amity Affliction
5 March 2020	Berlin	Germany		Beartooth; The Amity Affliction
6 March 2020	Leipzig	Germany		Beartooth; The Amity Affliction
Summer Festivals
~~10 August 2020~~	~~Barcelona~~	~~Spain~~	~~Knotfest at Sea~~	
~~14 August 2020~~	~~Naples~~	~~Italy~~	~~Knotfest at Sea~~	
25 June 2021	Manchester	United Kingdom	Bowlers Exhibition Centre	N/A

== Critical reception ==
Professional ratings
Aggregate scores
Source	Rating
Album of the Year	77/100
Review scores
Source	Rating
Discovered	8/10
Kerrang!	4/5
Kill Your Stereo	75/100
Pitchfork	7/10
Punknews.org	3.5/5 stars
Upset	4/5 stars

27 Miles Underwater was well received by contemporary music critics. On review aggregator website, Album of the Year, the album has an average rating of 77 out of 100 based on three critic reviews. Ian Cohen, writing for Pitchfork gave the album a 7.0 out of 10, calling it "the most 1995 sounding album of 2020". Cohen further said "while nearly every single part of a Higher Power song has an identifiable source, they cycle through ideas quick enough to avoid any charges of grand larceny even when they get caught stealing." He compared the album as a more accessible version of Turnstile, Creeper, or Code Orange. In a mixed review, Sam Houldon, writing for Punknews.org, also compared the album to Turnstile's sophomore album, Time & Space (also released through Roadrunner Records), and said that "straight off the bat; there is a lot of Turnstile in this record. Not to an extent that is fundamentally a problem, but certainly to an extent that you’re likely to find yourself thinking about it on more than one occasion."

Martyn Young, writing for Upset magazine gave the album an 8 out of 10 praising the composition and confidence on the record. Young wrote "it’s the sound of a confident band who know that they’re making a significant step up and are ready to shout about it."

=== Accolades ===
Accolades for 27 Miles Underwater
Publication	Accolade	Rank	Ref.
Stereogum	Stereogum's 50 Best Albums of 2020 – Mid-Year	18	

== Track listing ==
27 Miles Underwater
No.	Title	Length
1.	"Seamless"	3:14
2.	"Shedding Skin"	3:32
3.	"Lost In Static"	3:05
4.	"Rewire (101)"	1:50
5.	"Low Season"	2:37
6.	"Passenger"	3:07
7.	"King Of My Domain"	3:28
8.	"In The Meantime"	3:38
9.	"Staring At The Sun"	2:45
10.	"Self-Rendered: Lost"	2:55
11.	"Drag The Line"	4:07
Total length:		34:18

== Personnel ==
Credits adapted from the album's liner notes.

=== Higher Power ===
- Jimmy Wizard – lead vocals, car photos, insert photos
- Louis Hardy – guitar, backing vocals
- Max Harper – guitar
- Ethan Wilkinson – bass
- Alex Wizard – drums

=== Additional contributors ===
- Gil Norton – production
- Clint Murphy – engineering, mixing
- Oli Norton – mixing
- Ryan Smith – mastering
- Tarrant Shepherd – additional engineering
- Laurence Nelson – engineering assistance
- Frank Maddocks – art direction, design
- Nat Wood – band photos

== See also ==
- List of 2020 albums
