= There's Love in This World if You Want It =

Studio album by Higher Power
- Released: June 27, 2025
- Genre: Alternative metal; grungegaze
- Length: 36:50
- Label: Nuclear Blast

Higher Power chronology
27 Miles Underwater (2020)	There's Love in This World if You Want It (2025)

Singles from There's Love in This World if You Want It
- 1. "Absolute Bloom" Released: 7 February 2024; 2. "All the Rage" Released: 27 June 2025

There's Love in This World if You Want It is the third studio album by English hardcore punk band Higher Power. It was released on 27 June 2025, via Nuclear Blast, via LP, CD and digital formats.

== Background ==
Released five years after 27 Miles Underwater, the band's last full-length release in 2020, There's Love in This World if You Want It consists of nine songs with a total runtime of approximately thirty-seven minutes. Centering on the theme of inner peace, it was self-produced by the band. "Absolute Bloom", a single released on 7 February 2024 was included in the album. "All the Rage" was released as the second single on 27 June 2025.

== Reception ==
Professional ratings
Review scores
Source	Rating
Distorted Sound	8/10
Kerrang!	4/5

Kerrang's Sam Law assigned the album a rating of four out of five, stating that it "doesn't feel so much like a continuation of what's come before as a subtle reinvention," and describing it as "a record that refuses to overstay its welcome."

In an eight-out-of-ten review for Distorted Sound, Sammy Andrews noted the album "exhibits not only resilience, but curiosity and wonder in the face of it all. Higher Power balance emotional revelations and candour with a curiosity that finds them consistently pushing their sound."

== Track listing ==
No.	Title	Length
1.	"Absolute Bloom"	3:23
2.	"Count the Miles"	1:58
3.	"All the Rage"	4:00
4.	"Better"	3:34
5.	"Two Doors Down"	3:53
6.	"Lunar Tuesday"	4:31
7.	"Kaleidoscope"	3:56
8.	"Wide Awake"	2:55
9.	"My Sweet Surrender"	5:06
Total length:		36:50
