= F Club =

Punk rock and post-punk club night in Leeds

- Owner: John Keenan
- Type: Club-night
- Events: Punk rock; post-punk; new wave; gothic rock

Construction
- Opened: 1977
- Closed: 1982

The F Club was a punk rock, post-punk and new wave club night in Leeds that ran between 1977 and 1982. The venue hosted early performances by local bands including the Sisters of Mercy, Soft Cell, Gang of Four and New Model Army, as well as touring acts Siouxsie and the Banshees, Joy Division and the Cure. It largely established the post-punk scene of Leeds, and was foundational to the beginning and popularisation of gothic rock and the goth subculture. Beginning as the Stars of Today in a common room in Leeds Polytechnic in the summer of 1977, it was held at various venues across the city during its tenure, which also included the Ace of Clubs and Roots. After moving to Brannigan's in 1978, it changed its name to the Fan Club.

== History ==
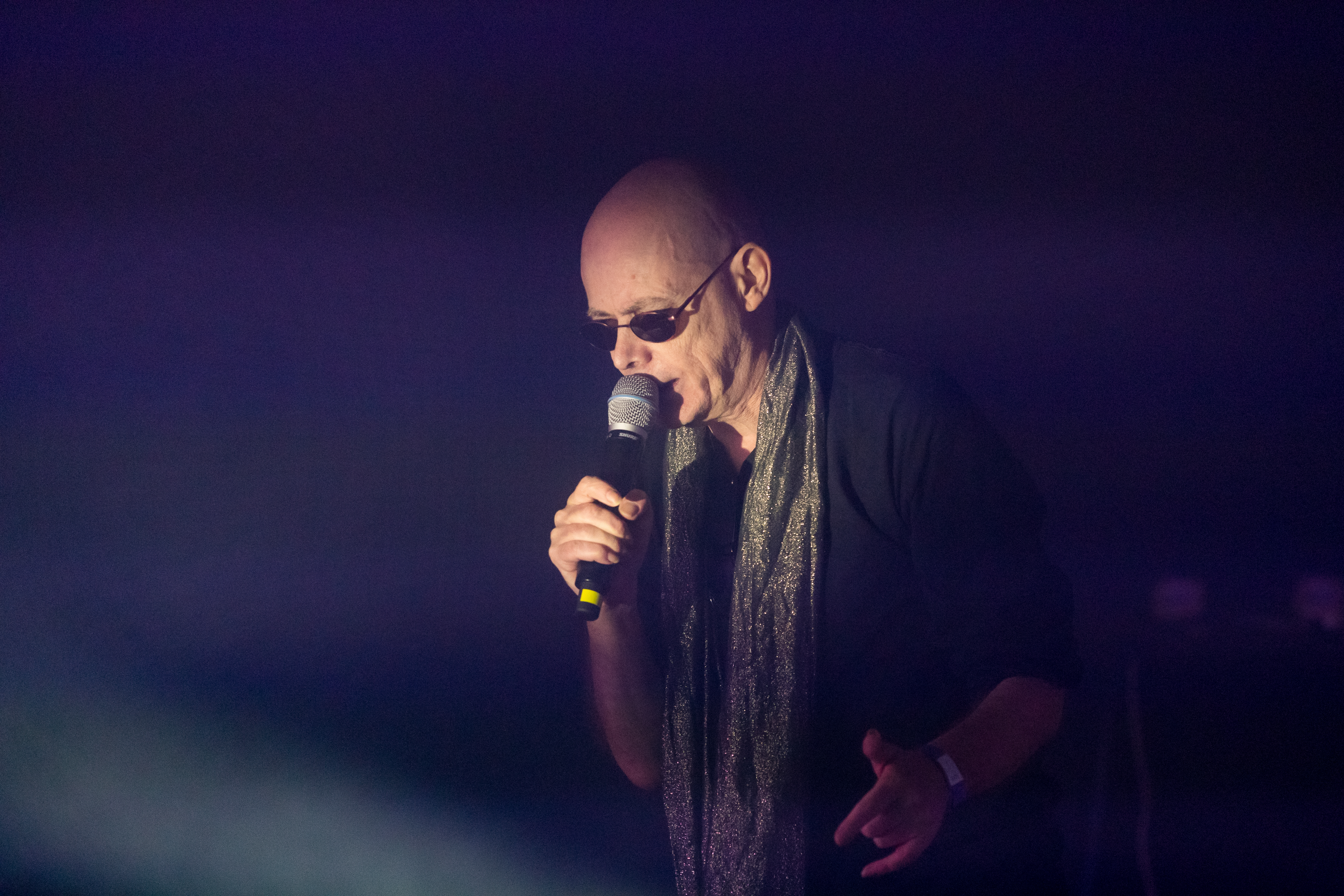
The original members of the Sisters of Mercy met and had their first performance at the F Club in 1980.

The club night began in the summer of 1977 under the name the Stars of Today. Founded by John Keenan, Graham Cardy and Shaun Cavell, the night originally was hosted in an available commonroom in Leeds Polytechnic. While here, it hosted performances by acts such as the Slits, XTC and Slaughter & the Dogs.

When the summer ended, the University did not wish for the night to continue leading to it relocating to the Ace of Clubs in Woodhouse. Here, the club changed its name to the F Club in reference to how to the flyer for the final event at the University read "Let's get the 'F' out of here". In order to keep the attendees through this move, the club introduced a £1 membership scheme, where members would be admitted at a reduced entry price. While here, the night was host to groups such as X-Ray Spex, Wayne County & the Electric Chairs, Sham 69, and early performances by the Mekons and Gang of Four. In 1978, it moved once again to Roots in Chapeltown, where it hosted Siouxsie and the Banshees, Joy Division, Rich Kids and Suicide.

In August 1978, it relocated to the basement of Brannigan's on the corner of Call Lane and Lower Briggate. With this move it changed its name to the Fan Club, due to a leaflet by the Leveller claiming the "F" stood for "fascist". Here it hosted the Cure. It was while the club was based in Brannigan's that Andrew Eldritch and Gary Marx first met, soon going on to be the founding lineup of the Sisters of Mercy. In 1981, the March Violets played their first performance at the venue, followed by the Sisters of Mercy's first performance. Bands such as Soft Cell, New Model Army, the Danse Society, Skeletal Family and Southern Death Cult also formed at the club during this period. In 1982, the club closed.

== Legacy ==
In Karl and Beverley Spracklen's book The Evolution of Goth Culture it was described as the space "where gothic rock was born in the form it is now". The club was foundational in the emergence of the goth subculture and led to other high profile clubs in the scene, such as the Batcave. It was frequented by members of many influential post-punk and gothic rock groups such as the Sisters of Mercy, the Mekons, Gang of Four, the March Violets, New Model Army and Southern Death Cult.

Siouxsie and the Banshees' performance at the F Club on 6 December 1977 and Joy Division's performances on 27 July 1978 and October 20 1978, were credited by John Robb in his book The Art of Darkness (2023) as largely inspiring Leeds' post-punk and gothic rock scene, inspiring the Sisters of Mercy and Salvation, as well as Craig Adams and Dave Wolfenden first band the Expelairs. Robb also credited Joy Division's October 20 1978 performance at the club as helping to popularise the name "gothic rock", due to journalist Des Moines describing the band as "gothic dance music".

On the third and fourth of October 2007, the New Roscoe hosted thirtieth anniversary performance for the club. On 12 October 2012, the Brudenell Social Club hosted 35th anniversary concert headlined by Penetration with support from Expelaires and Knife Edge reforming for the occasion. On 18 August 2018, the Brudenell Social Club hosted forty-first anniversary reunion show for the former members of the club.
