= Queens Hall, Leeds =

Former concert and exhibition venue in Leeds, England

Queens Hall
- Queens Hall in 1981, seen before demolition
- Interactive map of Queens Hall
- Former names: Swinegate Tram Depot
- Location: Leeds, West Yorkshire, England
- Coordinates: 53°47′38″N 1°32′37″W
- Owner: Leeds Corporation Tramways
- Capacity: 5,000

Construction
- Opened: May 1961
- Closed: 1989
- Demolished: 1989

Queens Hall was a concert and exhibition venue located in Leeds, West Yorkshire, England. It was originally a tram and then a bus depot and had latterly become a venue hosting events such as the Ideal Home Exhibition and the 1981, 1982, 1988 and 1989 Great British Beer Festival, flea markets, travelling fairs and concerts.

== History ==
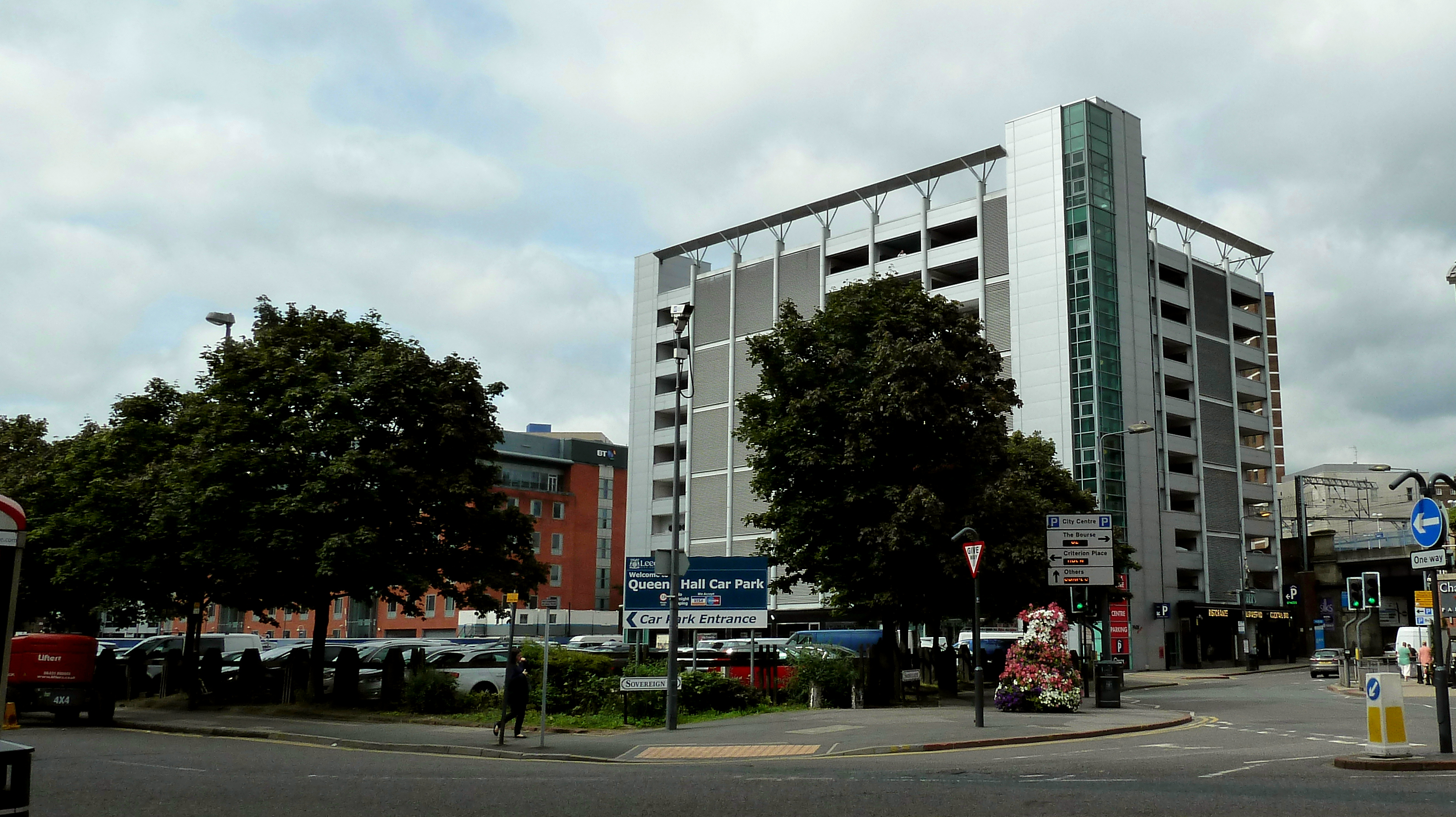
Multi-storey car park on the former site of Queens Hall

The building was originally constructed at the turn of the 20th century and was known as Swinegate Tram Depot. The hall was refurbished as a music venue in 1961 and was a popular venue amongst students and the townspeople of Leeds with a capacity for 5,000 people. The very first event to be held there was the Yorkshire Ideal Home & Food Exhibition (5–20 May 1961), sponsored by The Yorkshire Post.

Over the years, the Queens Hall had been as a venue for popular music. Motörhead complained about the acoustics, and it was uncomfortably cold in winter, with ice forming on the retained tramlines. As far back as the 1980s there was talk of an arena for Leeds and by that time the Queens Hall was in need of extensive modernisation to bring it up to an acceptable standard. The Queens Hall was demolished in 1989 and the site is now mostly used as a surface level car park, with redevelopment taking place on part of the site for a multi-storey car park with ground floor restaurant and an office building for BT. Construction work to add two additional storeys to the Criterion Place multi-storey car park began in July 2008.

The Leeds Arena, opened in 2013, became a new concert venue in the city.

== Redevelopment ==
Proposals for the redevelopment of the rest of the former Queens Hall site have been ongoing since the 1990s, with failed proposals including those from 1995 for an office building designed by Norman Foster for Royal London Insurance and a latter proposal in 2004 for two skyscrapers to be named Criterion Place designed by SimpsonHaugh and Partners to be developed by Simons Estates. Neither of these proposals came to fruition but plans to complete the redevelopment of the former Queens Hall site were realised in 2015 when new business premises called Sovereign Square were built on the site.

== Performers ==
Bands and musicians to have performed at the Queens Hall have included the following acts:

- AC/DC
- Black Sabbath
- Acker Bilk
- Bryan Adams
- Otis Redding
- Def Leppard
- Duran Duran
- Elton John
- Genesis
- Japan
- Joy Division
- Motörhead
- Ozzy Osbourne
- Pink Floyd
- Roxy Music
- Rush
- Tank
- T'Pau
- The Beatles
- The Clash
- The Damned
- The Faces
- The Jacksons
- The Jam
- The Police
- The Rolling Stones
- The Who
- Thin Lizzy
- UB40
- U2 (1980)
- Whitesnake
- Raven
- Saxon / Twisted Sister / Girlschool / Spider / Battleaxe All Day Festival 1983
- Saxon (1981 and 1984)
- Kiss
- Dio
- Wet Wet Wet
- Wham!
- Futurama Festival (1979, 1980 and 1983)

== See also ==
- Leeds Corporation Tramways
