= Seduction (The Danse Society album) =

Studio album by The Danse Society
- Released: September 1982
- Genre: Post-punk, gothic rock
- Label: Society
- Producer: The Danse Society, Tim Parry

The Danse Society chronology
Seduction (1982)	Heaven Is Waiting (1984)

Seduction is the debut studio album by English gothic rock band the Danse Society. It was released in September 1982 on the band's own record label, Society. It includes a song inspired by the David Lynch film Eraserhead.

== Track listing ==
Side A
No.	Title	Length
1.	"Godsend"	4:53
2.	"My Heart"	4:19
3.	"Falling Apart"	4:13
4.	"Danse / Move"	4:51

Side B
No.	Title	Length
1.	"Ambition"	6:35
2.	""In Heaven (Everything Is Fine)""	7:39

== Release ==
Seduction reached No. 3 in the UK Indie Chart.

In 2001, Cherry Red Records reissued a remastered, expanded edition of the album, Seduction: The Society Collection, as part of its Anagram Goth series. It included the original six-track album plus eight additional tracks taken from their early independent singles.

== Critical reception ==
Trouser Press panned the album, calling it a "longwinded six-track 12-inch with busy Bauhaus-strength mud supporting sporadic vocals and gimmicky sound effects. Tuneless and tedious".

== Personnel ==
The Danse Society

- Steven Victor Rawlings – vocals, sleeve concept
- Lyndon Scarfe – keyboards, production
- Paul Nash – guitar, production, sleeve concept
- Tim Wright – bass guitar, production
- Paul Gilmartin – drums, production

Technical

- Tim Parry – production
