= Soul Structure =

Studio album by Higher Power
- Released: 19 May 2017
- Studio: Holy Mountain and Mutiny Studios
- Genre: Hardcore punk; crossover thrash
- Length: 30:16
- Label: Flatspot
- Producer: Joel Grind

Higher Power chronology
Space to Breathe (2015)	Soul Structure (2017)	27 Miles Underwater (2020)

Singles from 27 Miles Underwater
- 1. "Can't Relate" Released: 6 April 2017

Soul Structure is the debut studio album by British hardcore punk band Higher Power. The album was released on 19 May 2017 through Flatspot Records.

== Critical reception ==
Professional ratings
Review scores
Source	Rating
Echoes and Dust	Positive
Exclaim!	9/10
Ghost Cult Magazine	9.0/10
Punknews.org	4/5 stars
Rock Sound	7/10
Sputnikmusic	4/5

Soul Structure was well received by contemporary music critics.

== Composition ==
The album makes use melodic singing counterposed by hardcore punk instrumentals. Many tracks incorporate vocal elements of alternative rock. In particular, writer Kieran Mitchell described vocalist Jimmy Wizard's singing as comparable to those used by Jane’s Addiction and Shelter. Similarly, Metal Hammer writer Luke Morton said that the album "channels the band’s influences of melodic hardcore but sounds like Perry Farrell is on vocals". Revolver writer Dan Epstein said the album has a "dynamic thrash/crossover sound". Karol Kamiński of Idioteq.com said the album "is about positive expression of aggression and a form of escapology. It is angry music – but lyrically they convey a lot about themselves as people. It’s about finding a positive outlet for their anger, whether it’s social issues or mental health, it’s adding a social consciousness and depth to what traditionally is quite a one-dimensional genre of music".

Branan Ranjanathan of Exclaim! described the album as "Combining classic NYHC-isms with grooves and melodic vocals reminiscent of Life of Agony, the unit go to great lengths to establish themselves as different from run-of-the-mill hardcore bands — and succeed". PunkNews.org described the album as possessing "all the groove of early nineties post-hardcore while also showcasing a musical style that is innovative in the often-derivative hardcore underground". In an article for Echoes and Dust, the album was described as mixing "East Coast hardcore grooves (think NYHC meets that Boston style) with a looser and more riffy LA vibe a la Suicidal Tendencies and topping it off with a UK hardcore grit". In an article for Rock Sound, writer David Mclaughlin described the album as "the UK’s answer to Turnstile". Kieran Mitchell of Ghost Cult Magazine praised the album for "bridging the gap between pop-punk and Nineties New York Hardcore".

== Track listing ==
No.	Title	Length
1.	"Can't Relate"	2:40
2.	"Looking Inward"	3:22
3.	"Balance"	2:55
4.	"Hole"	2:16
5.	"Four Walls Black"	2:24
6.	"Between Concrete and Sky"	3:48
7.	"Burning"	4:30
8.	"Embrace"	1:36
9.	"Reflect"	3:40
10.	"You Ain't Much"	3:05
Total length:		30:16

== Personnel ==
The following individuals were credited with the production, artwork, and recording of the album.

- Misha Hering — Recording
- James Atkinson — Vocals
- Arthur Rizk — Mixing
- Joel Grind — Mastering
- Sam Bailey — Artwork
