= The Chisel =

English punk band

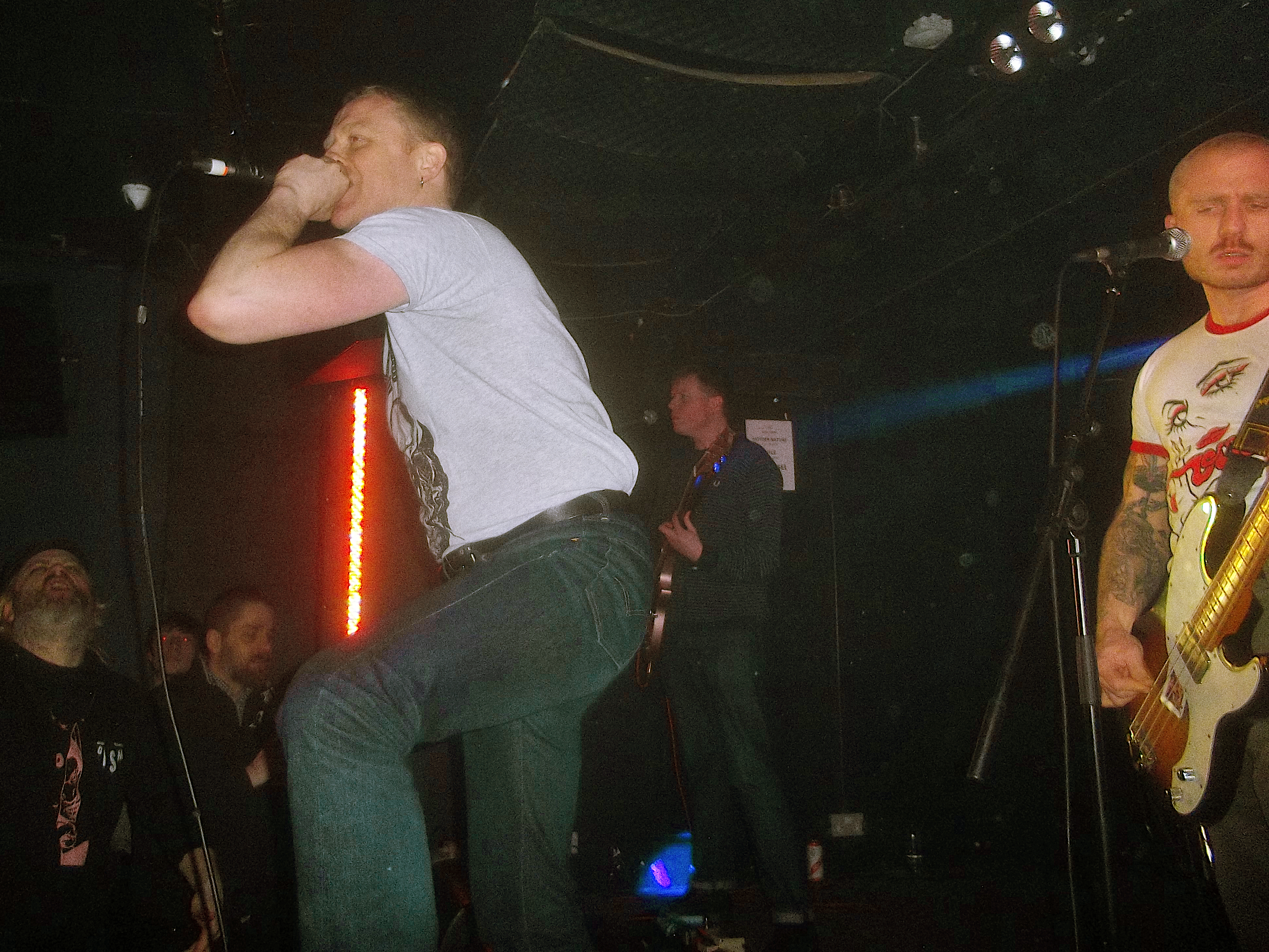
- The Chisel performing live in 2024 (left to right: Graham, Younger, De L'arbalete)

Background information
- Origin: London, UK
- Genres: Punk rock; oi!; hardcore punk; street punk
- Years active: 2020–present
- Labels: Pure Noise; La Vida Es Un Mus; Wardance
- Spinoff of: Arms Race, Chubby and the Gang,
- Members: Callum Graham; Charlie Manning-Walker; Luke Younger; Lee Munday; Jean de L'Arbalete
- Past members: Nicholas Sarnella; Tom Ellis
- Website: thechiseluk.com

The Chisel are an English punk rock band formed in London in 2020. Founded by former Arms Race members Nicholas Sarnella and Charlie "Chubby Charles" Manning-Walker, as well as Cal Graham, the band has released two studio albums and four EPs. Maximum Rocknroll writer Eric Anderson named them one of the leaders of "the new wave of Oi!".

== History ==
The Chisel was formed at the beginning of 2020 in London, and has its origin in Arms Race vocalist Nicholas Sarnella and Cal Graham discussing forming a band together, although with no particular style in mind. Once these discussion began to be realised, the pair recruited Arms Race's guitarist Charlie "Chubby Charles" Manning-Walker. This trio recorded the EP Deconstructive Surgery (2020) with Manning-Walker on guitar, Sarnella on drums and Graham on vocals, before hiring bassist Tom Ellis and additional guitarist Luke Younger. On 15 January 2021, they released their second EP Come See Me / Not The Only One, then on 5 March 2021, released their third EP Enough Said.

On 8 October 2021, they announced that their debut album Retaliation was set to be released on 26 November, and released the album's title track as a single. In August 2022, they toured European support the Circle Jerks. On 28 November 2022, they released a split EP with Mexican street punk band Mess. On 6 April 2023, they announced they had signed to Pure Noise Records. On 26 April, the label re-released the band's album Retaliation. On 6 May 2023, they released their single "Cry Your Eyes Out". From 19 to 27 May, they supported the Chats on their UK headline tour. From 28 May to 12 June, they supported GBH on their US headline tour. The band were featured on Pure Noise's Dead Formats Volume 2 compilation album, which they contributed a cover of Elton John's 1973 song "Saturday Night's Alright for Fighting".

== Musical style ==
Critics have categorised the Chisel's music as punk rock, oi!, street punk and hardcore punk, incorporating elements of pub rock, anarcho-punk, UK82 folk and rock and roll. Their music is often fast and aggressive while also being melodic. Graham's lyrics discuss topics such as fighting and working class struggle, with his vocals showcasing his Lancashire accent, with some songs making use of harmonicas and pianos. Stereogum writer Tom Breihan called their style a merger of "the speed and focus of the hardcore" and "classic UK street-punk, with its beery melodic abandon and its group-hug chant-along choruses".

They have cited influences including the Angelic Upstarts, Conflict, the Exploited, the Partisans, the Ramones, the Replacements and Leatherface.

== Members ==
Current

- Callum Graham – vocals (2020–present)
- Charlie "Chubby Charles" Manning-Walker – guitar (2020–present)
- Luke Younger – guitar (2020–present)
- Nicholas Sarnella – drums (2020-2022, 2025–present)
- Jean de L'Arbalete – bass (2022–present)

Former

- Tom Ellis – bass (2020–2022)
- Austin Sparkman - drums (2022-2023)
- Lee Munday – drums (2023-2025)

== Discography ==
Studio albums

- Retaliation (2022)
- What a Fucking Nightmare (2024)

EPs

- Deconstructive Surgery (2020)
- Come See Me / Not The Only One (2021)
- Enough Said (2021)
- Mess / the Chisel (2022; split with Mess)
