= Looking Through =

Studio album by The Danse Society
- Released: 1986
- Genre: Gothic rock, new wave
- Label: Society
- Producer: The Danse Society

The Danse Society chronology
Heaven Is Waiting (1984)	Looking Through (1986)	Change of Skin (2011)

Looking Through is the third studio album by English gothic rock band The Danse Society under the name The Danse Society International. It was released in 1986, through the band's own record label, Society. AllMusic described the album as "a collection of demos". Looking Through was the band's final album until 2011's Change of Skin.

== Track listing ==
All tracks are written by The Danse Society (Paul Gilmartin, Paul Nash, Steve Rawlings, David Whitaker and Tim Wright).

Side A
No.	Title	Length
1.	"All I Want"
2.	"Institution"
3.	"Sunset Gun"
4.	"Looking Through"

Side B
No.	Title	Length
1.	"Runaway"
2.	"House of Love"
3.	"Don't Stop Now"
4.	"Midnight Land"

== Critical reception ==
Along with the rest of the band's work, Trouser Press panned the album, calling it "more tedious and repetitive new wave disco for the doomy haircut-and-mascara brigade. Lacking any striking material, this is functional genre fare for yesterday's club kids."

== Personnel ==
- Paul Gilmartin – drums, production
- Paul Nash – guitar, production
- Steve Rawlings – vocals, production
- David Whitaker – keyboards, production
- Tim Wright – bass guitar, production
