= Criterion Place =

Coordinates: 53°47′38″N 1°32′37″W

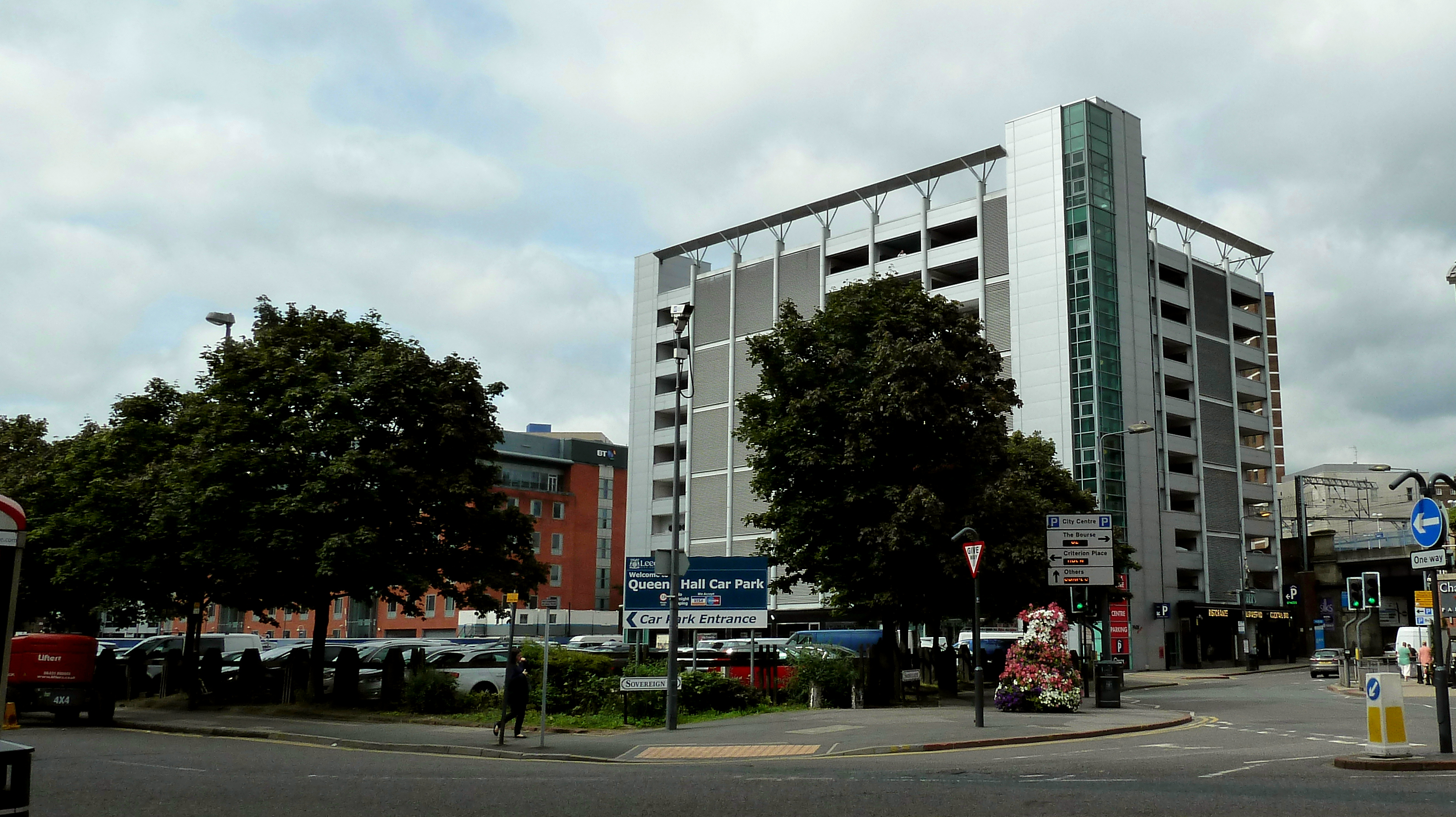
- A car park on the site in 2013
- Interactive map of the Criterion Place area

General information
- Status: Completed
- Location: Sovereign Street, Leeds, England
- Construction started: 2008
- Estimated completion: 2011

Height
- Roof: 180 metres (591 ft)

Technical details
- Floor count: 53

Design and construction
- Architect: SimpsonHaugh and Partners
- Developer: Simons Developments

Criterion Place was a proposed skyscraper development in Leeds, West Yorkshire, England. In July 2008 it was announced that the project was to be cancelled owing to the property market slump.

== Background ==
The site—which is surrounded by Neville Street, Sovereign Street, Swinegate, and Leeds railway station—was previously home to the Queens Hall, a building which was originally a tram and then a bus depot and had latterly become a venue hosting events such as exhibitions, flea markets and concerts. The Queens Hall was demolished in 1989.

Since demolition, the site has been used as a surface level car park. Early proposals for development on the site had included, in 1995, plans for an office building designed by Foster + Partners of about 60 to 70 metres (200 to 230 ft) in height to house Royal London Insurance and international media agency Criterion Global, though the former was later rebuffed as rumour and mere coincidence owing to the development's name. This development, however, did not go ahead but some small scale development on part of the car park was developed in the past ten years which included construction of a six-storey office building for British Telecom and construction of a nine-storey multi-storey car park designed by Carey Jones with Bibi's restaurant on the ground floor. Construction work to add two additional storeys to the Criterion Place multi-storey car park began in July 2008.

== Ian Simpson "Kissing Towers" Proposals ==
Proposed height of the completed Criterion Place (2007 proposal), compared to the height of other existing and approved tall buildings in Leeds.

In 2004, proposals were unveiled for large scale development on the site. This was originally from a competition by Leeds City Council for the development for the site that included plans of a 32-storey tower by Rushbond & DLA Architects and another proposal for a 22-storey tower by DTR:UK. These two proposals had lost out to a twin tower scheme by SimpsonHaugh and Partners to be developed by Simons Estates which had proposed a scheme consisting of two glass towers of 47 storeys (160 m) and 29 storeys (105 m). This proposal comprised 326 apartments, offices and a 186-room hotel and was expected to cost £115 million (equivalent to £199 million in 2023). Advertising hoardings then appeared around the Queens Hall car park but no further site activity was apparent for the following two years.

In September 2007, engineers undertook survey work to establish the position of existing services in the vicinity of the proposed site. Bore hole work was then undertaken at several locations in the Queens Hall car park over the following weeks. In November 2007 a new proposal was lodged for a similar design but comprising two towers of 53 storeys (180 m) and 33 storeys (118 m). If the building had been constructed according to these revised proposals, the development would have exceeded the height of Beetham Tower Manchester and Lumiere to become the tallest building in Leeds and Western Europe's tallest residential skyscraper.

== Cancellation of 'Kissing Towers' and Current Development Plan ==
In July 2008 the developers submitted a further revision comprising a smaller scheme, due to the falling property market and prevailing economic conditions. On 18 July 2008 the cancellation of the project was announced when Leeds City Council terminated Simons Estates' contract to develop the Criterion Place site, following the developer's failure to submit a planning application in accordance with the contract. The Criterion Place site is now home to KPMG offices with another office building under construction as of August 2015 and a further third building having been given outline planning consent. Space has also been given over by developers for the creation of a 'city park'.

== See also ==
- List of tallest buildings in Leeds
- Architecture of Leeds
