= Arms Race (band) =

English hardcore punk band

- Origin: London, England
- Genre: Hardcore punk
- Years active: 2012–2019
- Labels: Quality Control, La Vida Es Un Mus, Painkiller
- Spinoffs: Chubby and the Gang; the Chisel
- Spinoff of: Violent Reaction
- Past members: Nicholas "Stab" Sarnella; Ola Herbich; Charlie "Chubby Charles" Fresh; Nicky Rat; LLoyd Clipston; Oli McVean; Patrick Henderson; Tom Pimlott

Arms Race were an English hardcore punk band formed in London in 2012. They were a part of the New Wave of British Hardcore.

== History ==
Arms Race was formed at end of 2012, by Nick Stab, Ola Herbich, Patrick Henderson and Oli McVean in an attempt to make music that merged the sounds of United Blood, Condemned 84 and The Partisans. They released their first demo as a band in 2013.

On 1 October 2014, they released their debut EP Gotta Get Out, through Quality Control HQ and Painkiller Records. In April 2015, they played Washington D.C.'s Damaged City Festival. In June 2015, they toured the U.S. with co-headliner Violent Reaction. The same year, Henderson departed from the band, due to scheduling issues, and artist Nicky Rat from Belgium, took on his role.

In October 2016, they played Toronto's No Dead Yet Festival. In October 2017, they toured Japan. On 8 February 2018, they released their second EP The Best through La Vida Es Un Mus and Painkiller Records. In September 2018, they played on the Saturday of Ready Festival, followed by playing a free show at London's Dr. Martens store with Higher Power and Stages in Faith. In April 2018, they played Damaged City Festival 2018.

They played their final show at Damage is Done festival on 22 November 2019, with The Flex, Payday, Ekulu and Big Cheese. Ola Herbich was one of several guest vocalists to contribute to Raise Your Voice Joyce: Contemporary Shouts From Contemporary Voices, a compilation of music covertly recorded by the Canadian band Fucked Up in 2018.

== Musical style ==
The band's music merges elements of U.S. hardcore bands like early Agnostic Front and SSD with U.K. hardcore like Chaos UK and Charged GBH, as well as elements of oi! and death metal. Their earliest influences were the sounds of United Blood, Condemned 84 and the Partisans. They are considered a hardcore punk band. In an article for Stereogum, Tom Breihan described them as "what might’ve happened if Motörhead had decided that they wanted to be Youth Of Today".

== Members ==
Final

- Nicholas "Stab" Sarnella – vocals (2012–2019)
- Ola Herbich – guitar (2012–2019)
- Charlie "Chubby Charles" Fresh – guitar (2012–2019)
- Nicky Rat – bass (2015–2019)
- LLoyd Clipston – drums (2018–2019)

Former

- Oli McVean – drums (2012–2016)
- Patrick Henderson – bass (2012–2015)
- Tom Pimlott – drums (2016–2018)

== Discography ==
Albums

- New Wave of British Hardcore (2016)

EPs

- Gotta Get Out (2014)
- The Beast (2018)

Compilations

- New Nonsense (2015)
