= Big Cheese (band) =

English hardcore punk band

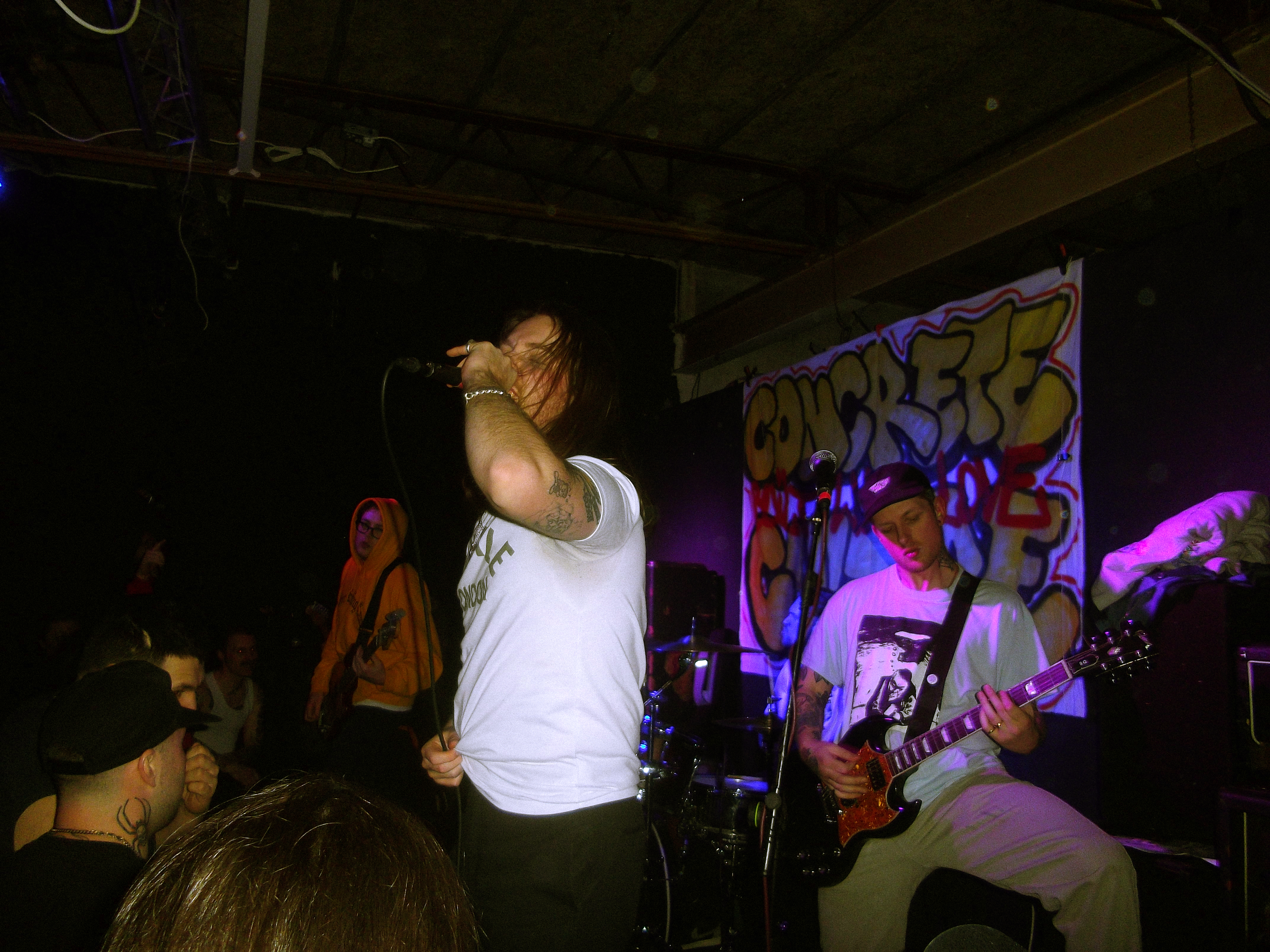
- Big Cheese performing in 2022

Background information
- Origin: Leeds, West Yorkshire, England
- Genre: Hardcore punk
- Years active: 2016–present
- Labels: Quality Control, Triple B, Painkiller
- Spinoffs: Chubby and the Gang, Bodyweb
- Spinoff of: Higher Power, Blind Authority, Rapture
- Members: Tom "Razor" Hardwick; Louis Hardy; Meg Mills; Joe Williams; Alex Wizard
- Past members: Anthony Wheatley

Big Cheese is an English hardcore punk band from Leeds, West Yorkshire. They are a part of the New Wave of British Hardcore. In an article for Metal Hammer, Jimmy Wizard included their song "Rotter" in his "essential hardcore mixtape".

== History ==
The band formed in 2016, when guitarist Meg Mills (who then-played in Rapture) and vocalist and then-bassist Tom "Razor" Hardwick (formerly of Obstruct, Fade, Violent Reaction and Shrapnel) began living together. After developing some of the songs Brooks had written, the pair decided to recruit Louis Hardy and Alex Wizard of fellow-Leeds hardcore band Higher Power to play guitar and drums, respectively. On 22 October 2017, they played a sold-out show at the Camden Underworld with Trapped Under Ice, Higher Power, King Nine and Chamber. As soon as they began playing live, Hardwicke handed bass duties over to Anthony Wheatley (formerly of Sheffield hardcore band the Pact).

In June 2018, they played Outbreak Festival in Leeds. In August they toured Europe with Illusion of New York. In October, they opened for Turnstile on their UK headline tour. On 17 April 2019, they released Don't Forget To Tell The World, a compilation of all their material released up to that point through Painkiller Records. This included their EP Aggravated Mopery and live tape from a NWOBHCFM Radio session. On 21 July, they opened for Have Heart on their reunion run at the Stylus in Leeds. In June and early-August, they began a European headline tour with Mere Mortal, followed by a European tour with Culture Abuse and Short Sharp Shock hosted by Vans. In October, they announced that they would be entering the studio to record their debut studio album Punishment Park. They released their first single from the album on 3 December 2019, titled "Write-Off". On 8 October 2021, they released the three track EP Anymore for Anymore.

== Musical style ==
Big Cheese play hardcore punk. Their music is influenced by New York hardcore bands like Warzone, Killing Time, Leeway, Breakdown, Madball, Rest in Pieces, Sick of It All and Crumbsuckers in addition to UK bands like Motörhead, Charged GBH, Ripcord and Voorhees. They often make use of drums grooves and metallic riffs. Author Freddie Alva described their debut album as "a love letter to the NYHC sound during the late 1980s". In an article for Hard Noise, writer Fred Pessaro described their style as "Melding Breakdown metallic brutality and Warzone-y groove".

== Members ==
- Tom "Razor" Hardwick – lead vocals (2016–present), bass (2016, 2019)
- Louis Hardy – guitar (2016–present)
- Meg Mills – guitar (2016–present)
- Joe Sam Williams – bass (2019–present)
- Alex Wizard – drums (2016–present)

Former members

- Anthony Wheatley - bass (2016–2019)

== Discography ==
Studio albums

- Punishment Park (2020)

EPs

- Aggravated Mopery (2017)
- Anymore for Anymore (2021)

Demos

- Sports Day (2016)
- Tower To The Sun (2018)

Compilations

- Don't Forget To Tell The World (2019)
