= The Flex (band) =

English hardcore punk band

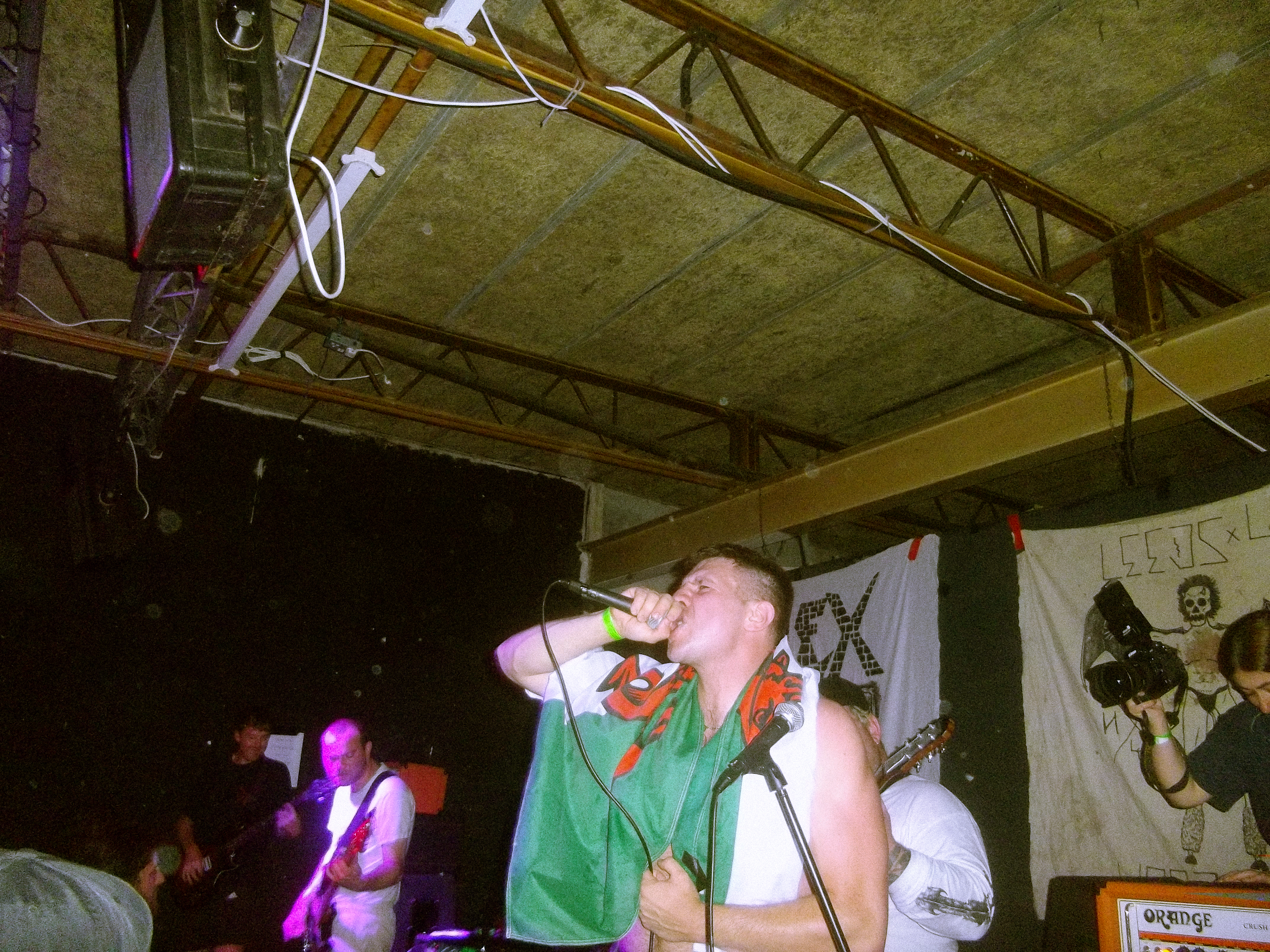
- The Flex performing in 2022

Background information
- Also known as: Rick Flex (2012)
- Origin: Leeds, West Yorkshire, England
- Genres: Hardcore punk, tough guy hardcore
- Years active: 2012–present
- Labels: Quality Control; Painkiller; Milk Run; Video Disease; Bleeding Edges; Lockin' Out
- Spinoff of: Violent Reaction
- Members: Sam Laycock; Liam Fox; Dave Egan; Andy Jones; Tom Pimlott
- Past members: Rick Savage

The Flex (formerly known as Rick Flex) are an English hardcore punk band from Leeds, West Yorkshire. In an article by NoEcho, they were cited as one of the progenitors of the New Wave of British Hardcore.

== History ==
The band formed in 2012 under the name Rick Flex from members of other UK hardcore bands (including Arms Race and Violent Reaction), playing different instruments to those that they were used to, for the original guitarist Rick Savage's birthday party, he was eventually replaced by then-drummer Liam Fox and Tom Pimlott of Violent Reaction was recruited to play drums. On 10 May, they released their debut demo. In February 2013, they opened for Rotting Out on their UK tour. On 23 March 2013 they released their debut EP Scum On The Run through Video Disease and Milk Run Records. In May 2014, they toured the U.S. with Violent Reaction. On 19 March 2015, they released their second EP "Flexual Healing Vol.5: Do Ya Think I'm Flexi?" and 23 March released their third EP Don't Bother with the Outside World. Between April and May of the same year, they toured the U.S. with Red Death, followed by a European Headline tour in June and August. On 1 June 2016, the band opened for Power Trip at the Boston Music Room in London. In April 2018, they played Damaged City festival in Washington D.C., followed by releasing their EP Flexual Healing Vol 7: Perhaps the War is Over? Perhaps it's Peace? on the 19th of the same month. In June 2019, they opened for Have Heart at their matinee Leeds reunion show.

== Musical style ==
The band have been described as hardcore punk and tough guy hardcore. Their music is influenced by the sound of '80s New York and Boston hardcore like Agnostic Front and SSD. Max Cussons of Contactmusic described their sound as "clobbering two-stepping punk". Gav Russell of CVLT Nation described them as "a band who trim away all the fat to leave a no-frills, 80’s infused hardcore battering of the finest order".

== Members ==
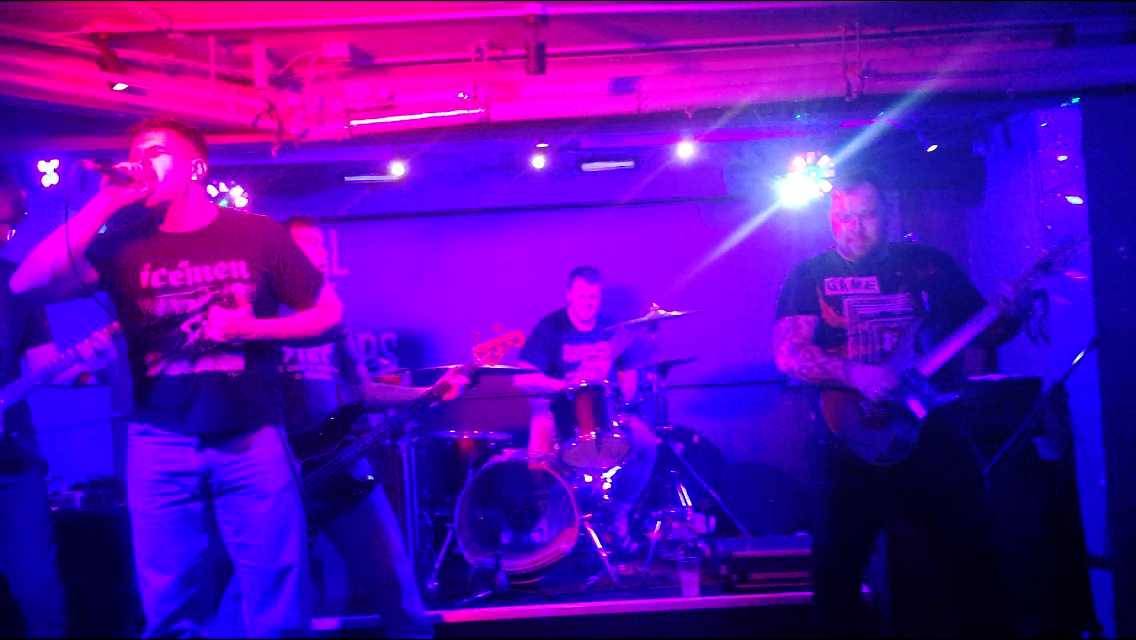
The Flex performing in 2020. From left to right: Dave Egan, Sam Laycock, Andy Jones, Tom Pimlott, Liam Fox

Current

- Sam Laycock – lead vocals (2012–present)
- Liam Fox – guitar (2013–present), drums (2012)
- Dave Egan – guitar (2012–present)
- Andy Jones – bass (2012–present)
- Tom Pimlott – drums (2013–present)

Former

- Rick Savage – guitar (2012)

== Discography ==
Studio album

- Wild Stabs in the Dark (2014)
- Chewing Gum for the Ears (2022)

EPs

- Scum on the Run (2013)
- Flexual Healing Vol.5: Do Ya Think I'm Flexi? (2015)
- Don't Bother with the Outside World (2015)
- Flexual Healing Vol:7: Perhaps the War is Over? Perhaps it's Peace? (2018)

Demos

- Demo (2012)
- Flexual Healing Vol.1 (2013)
- Flexual Healing Vol.3: T.H.E. F.L.E.X. (2014)

Live

- Flexual Healing Vol.2: in the Doghouse (2013)
- Flexual Healing Vol.4: Live in the Flex House (2015)
- Flexual Healing Vol.6: Live from the Pain Cave (2016)

== Accolades ==
Nominated work	Year	Award	Result
Wild Stabs in the Dark	2014	CVLT Nation - Best UKHC Album	#4
