= Higher Power (band) =

English hardcore punk band

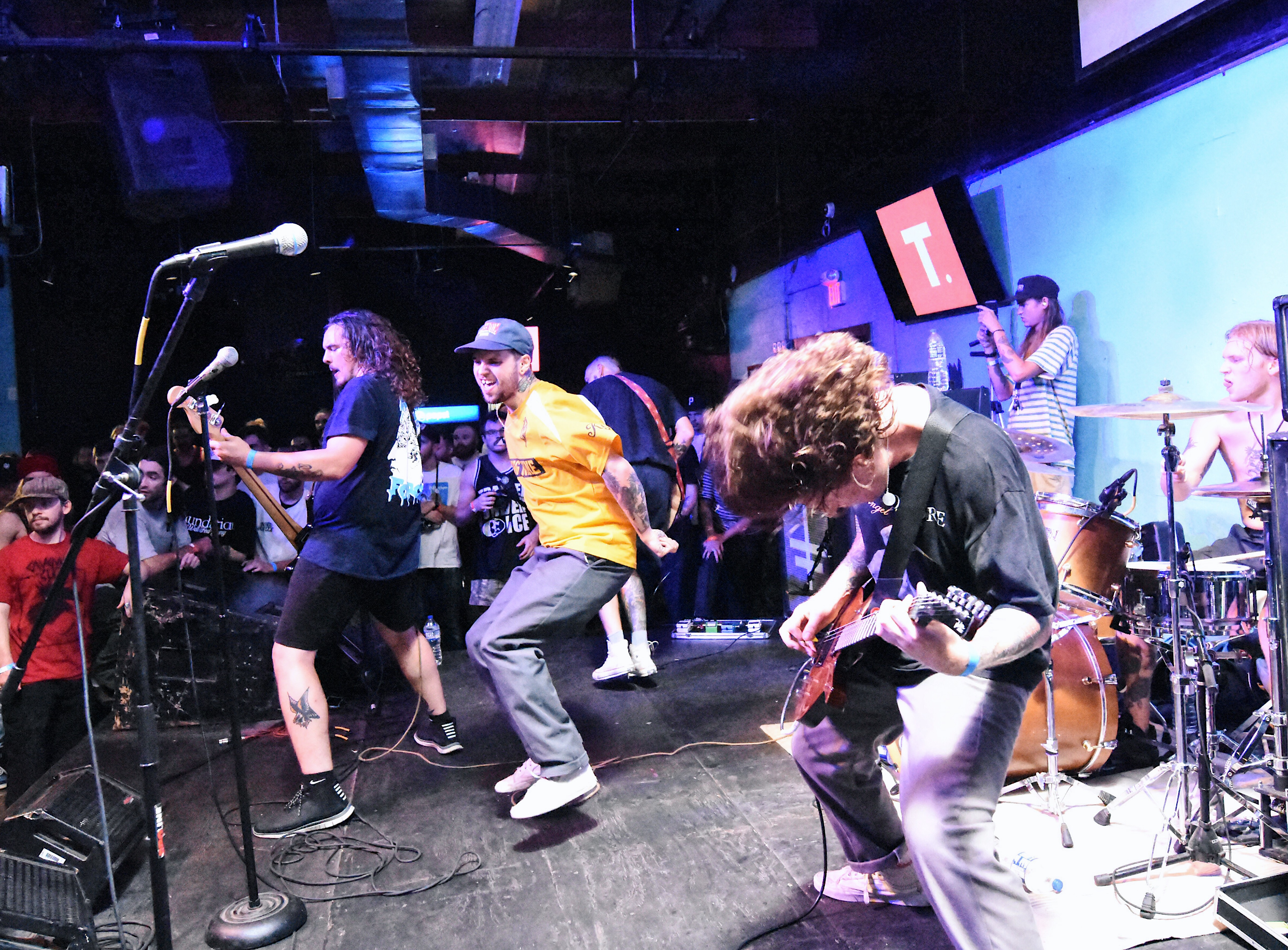
- Higher Power in 2017

Background information
- Origin: Leeds, West Yorkshire, England
- Genres: Hardcore punk; alternative metal; melodic hardcore; crossover thrash
- Years active: 2014–present
- Labels: Roadrunner, Flatspot, Venn, Nuclear Blast
- Spinoffs: Big Cheese, Bodyweb
- Spinoff of: Violent Reaction
- Members: Jimmy Wizard; Max Harper; Alex Wizard; Ethan Wilkinson; Louis Hardy
- Website: higherpowerleeds.com

Higher Power are an English hardcore punk band formed in Leeds, West Yorkshire in 2014. They have released three full-length studio albums, one EP, one live album and one demo. Their second album, 27 Miles Underwater, was their major label debut through Roadrunner Records. In a 2020 poll by Revolver magazine, they were voted the most likely contemporary band to breakthrough into the mainstream. They are a part of the New Wave of British Hardcore.

== History ==
In 2014, drummer Alex Wizard moved from London to Leeds and then began writing music with his brother Jimmy Wizard. They intended to record just a single demo, inspired by the sound of Leeway and Merauder. The band took its name from the Subzero song of the same name. The pair then enlisted guitarists Louis Hardy and Max Harper, and began to search for a vocalist, however unable to find anybody, Jimmy handed bass duties to Ethan Wilkinson and began singing himself. Their debut self-titled demo tape was released on 1 February 2015. They released their debut EP Space To Breathe on 20 August the same year. In March 2016, they played a number of dates on the east coast of America, including a spot at United Blood Festival. Their debut album Soul Structure was released on 19 May 2017. On 13 August 2017, they opened for Turnstile on their sole UK date of the year, at the Brudenell Social Club in Leeds. In September 2017, they opened for No Warning on the Life or Death Tour, along with Vein, Twitching Tongues and Backtrack. In June 2018, they played Download Festival. In September 2018, they headlined a free show at London's Dr. Martens store, with support by Arms Race and Stages in Faith. In April and May 2019, they toured the U.S. is support of Knocked Loose, the Acacia Strain and Harm's Way. In August 2019, they performed at Reading and Leeds Festivals and Two Thousand Trees Festival.

In September 2019, they signed to Roadrunner Records, and announced that their sophomore album 27 Miles Underwater would be released 24 January 2020 and opened for Vein on their North American tour. On 6 September 2019, they released their first single from the album titled "Seamless". On 12 November, they album's second single "Low Season" was released. From 20 January 2020 to 28 January, they went on a North American co-headline tour with Take Offence and support from Drain. On 24 January 2020, they released their sophomore album 27 Miles Underwater. The album's third and final single was released 19 January 2020, titled "Lost in Static". From January 29 to 9 February, they headlined their own North American tour, with support from Life's Question, Queensway and Hangman. From 16 February to 6 March, they opened for Beartooth on their European headline tour, with addition support from the Amity Affliction. On 20 February, it was announced that the band would play the first Knotfest at Sea, from 10 to 14 August 2020, however the festival was postponed a year due to the COVID-19 pandemic. On 24 November, Kerrang! released a video of a live performance by the band at the K! Pit in East London. In June 2021, the band played the Download Festival Pilot, the first music festival held the United Kingdom since the Coronavirus outbreak in March 2020.

In an interview with Kerrang! released on 15 December 2021, it was announced that guitarist Louis Hardy had "quietly" left the group in the prior months. Because of this Jimmy Wizard, took over on guitar in studio, and Big Cheese bassist Joe Williams became the band's touring guitarist. In the same interview, they announced the release of the single "Fall From Grace", which was released on 17 December. In 2022, Hardy joined the band in their performance at Outbreak Fest, citing his return to the group. On 7 February 2024, the band released the single "Absolute Bloom", which was followed on 13 June by the single "Stillpoint" featuring Mikey Petroski of Never Ending Game.

On 27 June 2025, the band surprise released their third LP There's Love in This World if You Want It via Nuclear Blast.

== Musical style and influences ==
The band have been categorised as hardcore punk, alternative metal, melodic hardcore, post-hardcore and crossover thrash. Their music merges groovey New York hardcore-influenced instrumentals with melodic vocals and dynamic rhythm changes, often incorporating elements of alternative rock, sludge metal, punk rock, thrash metal, shoegazing, grunge, post-grunge, funk metal and screamo. Revolver describes their sound as "a singular mix of hardcore, alt rock and funk that evokes Deftones, Jane's Addiction and Bad Brains". In an article for Metal Hammer, Dannii Leivers described it as combining "80s metal influences, lush 90s alt and Alice In Chains sludge, doused in snotty Suicidal Tendencies' attitude". Andrew Sacher of BrooklynVegan, described their first album as "'90s New York hardcore and alt-metal worship", while calling their second album closer to alternative rock, despite still retaining elements of hardcore.

In a 2020 article for Guitar World, when asked about the band's style, guitarist Louis Hardy stated "We come from hardcore, but I don't think of us as a hardcore band... I don't listen to it and think this sounds like hardcore music. I just think of [us] as a rock band".

Hardy primarily plays a 2019 Gibson SG guitar through a Peavey 6505+ amplifier, while Harper often uses a Charvel San Dimas in order to make use of its whammy bar. Their music is often written with guitars tuned to D# standard.

They have cited influences including Leeway, Merauder, Only Living Witness, Life of Agony, Minor Threat, Maximum Penalty, Alice in Chains, Crown of Thornz, Turnstile, Metallica, Suicidal Tendencies, Jane's Addiction, Helmet and Deftones. Vocalist Jimmy Wizard, in particular, has cited groups such as Glassjaw, Deftones, Shift, Less Than Jake and Linkin Park as influences on his vocal style. Guitarist Max Harper has cited Tom Morello, particularly his work in Rage Against the Machine, as one musician who inspired his guitar playing style the most, with Hardy also citing Morello, in addition to Wes Borland of Limp Bizkit, as having a similar influence on his guitar playing.

They have been cited as an influence by Split Chain.

== Members ==
Current

- Jimmy "J-Town" Wizard – lead vocals (2014–present), guitar (2021–2022), bass (2014)
- Max Harper – guitar (2014–present)
- Alex Wizard – drums (2014–present)
- Ethan Wilkinson – bass (2014–present)
- Louis Hardy – guitar (2014–2021; 2022–present)

Former touring

- Joe Williams – guitar (2021–2022)

== Discography ==
Studio albums

- Soul Structure (2017)
- 27 Miles Underwater (2020)
- There's Love in This World if You Want It (2025)

Compilation albums

- Year One Collection (2016)

EPs

- Demo 2015 (2015)
- Live in Notts '15 (2015)
- Space to Breathe (2015)
- LP Promos (2016)

Singles

- "World Gone Mad" (2016)
- "Can't Relate" (2017)
- "Seamless" (2019)
- "Low Season" (2019)
- "Lost in Static" (2020)
- "Misunderstood" (2020)
- "Fall from Grace" (2021)
- "Absolute Bloom" (2024)
- "Stillpoint" featuring Never Ending Game (2024)

== Accolades ==
Nominated work	Year	Award	Result
Soul Structure	2017	Revolver - Best Album	#10
Higher Power	2020	Heavy Music Awards - Best UK Breakthrough Band	Nominated
