= The Danse Society =

English gothic rock band

- Also known as: Y?, Danse Crazy
- Origin: Barnsley, England
- Genres: Gothic rock; post-punk; dark wave; new wave
- Years active: 1980–1986; 2011–present
- Labels: Society, Arista
- Members: Maethelyiah; Paul Nash; Jack Cooper; Steve Dickinson; Dylan Riley
- Past members: Paul Gilmartin; David Whitaker; Steve Rawlings; Lyndon Scarfe; Timothy Wright; Iain Hunter; Joss Rylance; Tom Davenport; Sam Bollands; Jono Mori

The Danse Society (formerly known as Y? or Danse Crazy) are an English gothic rock band, formed in Barnsley in 1980. They were originally active until 1986, reforming in 2010. They achieved moderate success during their career. Their lineup included Steve Rawlings (vocals), Paul Nash (guitar), Lyndon Scarfe (keyboards), Tim Wright (bass guitar) and Paul Gilmartin (drums). Scarfe was replaced by David Whitaker (formerly of Music for Pleasure) after the Heaven Is Waiting album.

== Background ==
=== First incarnation ===
Originally called Y? and then Danse Crazy (changed due to the emerging Two Tone scene), Danse Society recorded and released their first single, "Clock", on their own newly formed record label Society in 1980. They released their debut studio album, Seduction, in 1982. It reached No. 3 in the UK Indie Chart.

Their second studio album, Heaven Is Waiting, was released in December 1983 on record label Arista. It reached No. 39 in the UK albums chart. The album contained a cover of the Rolling Stones' song "2000 Light Years from Home", also edited in 1984 as a 12" single and as a limited-edition double single. In 1985 the band recorded a single with producers Stock, Aitken and Waterman, "Say It Again", at the behest of Arista-BMG Records.

In 1986, after releasing their final album, Looking Through, as The Danse Society International, all of the band members except lead singer Rawlings left to form Johnny in the Clouds.

Rawlings continued as Society, and in 1987, released a single, "Saturn Girl". After 1987, Rawlings continued to pursue music with the electronic dance music act Meridian Dream.

=== Reformation ===
A campaign titled The Danse Society Reformation Plot was started on Facebook at the end of 2009 and succeeded in bringing most of the band back together. The reformed Danse Society, featuring new vocalist Maethelyiah from the group Blooding Mask, released their fourth studio album, Change of Skin, in July 2011. One of the early demo songs from the reconstituted band's album can still be heard on YouTube, featuring original vocalist Steve Rawlings. And in 2021, it appeared in the "Best Of" Danse Society collection. But Rawlings did not finish the album, so Maethelyiah performed all the vocals instead. The album release was followed in November 2011 with the first single to be taken from the newly reformed album, "God Cry". In April 2012, they released the second single from Change of Skin, "Vatican", backed with a reworking of their early song "Seduction". Their first live gig in 25 years was performed at Germany's Wave-Gotik-Treffen festival in May 2012, followed by selected festival dates.

An unreleased track called 'Towers' was recorded at the end of 2010 with Rawlings on vocals, his only contribution to the reformation. The music of this track was then used for the title track of the album Change of Skin, with the new singer Maethelyiah who has subsequently fronted the band.

Their fifth studio album, Scarey Tales, was released in February 2013.

On 1 February 2014, Danse Society issued an official announcement that Gilmartin and Roberts had unexpectedly resigned from the band, resulting in the cancellation of a series of tour dates. Nash, Whitaker and Maethelyiah continued with Danse Society, joined by new bassist Lee Jones and drummer Iain Hunter. David Whitaker was replaced by Sam Bollands in late 2014, with Jack Cooper replacing Lee Jones. On 9 December 2014, the single "If I Were Jesus" / "Sound of Silence" was released followed by the sixth studio album on 25 September 2015 called, VI.

In June 2018 the band release an EP, The FUTUR1ST, including a cover of Nine Inch Nail's "Hurt" dedicated to the Sophie Lancaster Foundation, and the tracks "One Thought in Heaven" and "Scream" featuring drummer Joss Rylance who replaced Iain Hunter, and who has subsequently been replaced by Tom Davenport. September 2020 saw the release of the band's seventh studio album, Sailing Mirrors, whilst celebrating their 40 years anniversary. In June 2021, Dylan Riley replaced Davenport and Jono Mori replaced Bollands for a short UK tour, with Billy Bostanci stepping for Jack Cooper temporarily. Jono Mori has since been replaced by Steve Dickinson and the band released their eighth studio album The Loop in 2024.

Founding drummer Paul Gilmartin died on 6 August 2024. He performed on the band’s key 1980s releases, including Seduction (UK Indie No. 3) and Heaven Is Waiting (UK No. 39), and remained with the reformed lineup until 2014.

== Discography ==
=== Studio albums ===
- Seduction (1982)
- Heaven Is Waiting (1983)
- Looking Through (1986) (as The Danse Society International)
- Change of Skin (2011)
- Scarey Tales (2013)
- VI (2015)
- Sailing Mirrors (2020)
- The Loop (2024)

=== Compilation albums ===
- The Danse Society (1983)
- The Danse Society (1984)
- Demos Vol. 1 (2011)
- ONT BBC (2020)
- A-Z 40 Years of Danse (2021)
- 40 Years of Danse - EXTENDE (2021)

=== Singles ===
Month	Year	Title	UK	UK Indie	Record label
September	1980	"Clock"/"Continent"	—	11	Society
March	1981	"There Is No Shame in Death"	—	26	Society
May	1981	"Woman's Own"	—	—	Society
December	1982	"Somewhere"	—	2	Society
March	1983	"Somewhere" (re-issue)	94	—	Arista
July	1983	"We're So Happy"	—	22	Society
August	1983	"Wake Up"/"Seduction"	61	—	Arista
October	1983	"Heaven Is Waiting"	60	—	Arista
March	1984	"2,000 Light Years from Home"	77	—	Arista
July	1985	"Say It Again"	83	—	Arista
February	1986	"Hold On (To What You've Got)"	89	—	Arista
August	1987	"Saturn Girl" (as Society)	—	48	Big Life
November	1987	"Love It" (as Society)	—	19	Big Life
November	2011	"God Cry"	—	—	Society
April	2012	"Vatican"	—	—	Society
December	2014	"If I Were Jesus" / "Sound of Silence"	—	—	Society
June	2018	The FUTUR1ST (EP)	—	—	Society
Sept	2020	Sailing Mirrors	—	—	Society
Aug	2025	The Sound and the Fury	—	—	Society
