= Violent Reaction =

English hardcore punk band

- Origin: Liverpool, Merseyside, England
- Genre: Hardcore punk
- Years active: 2011–2016
- Labels: Quality Control, Painkiller, Revelation, Static Shot, Mind Rot
- Spinoffs: Arms Race; The Flex
- Past members: Tom Pimlott; Tom "Razor" Hardwick; Charlie Fresh; Jimmy "J–Town" Wizard; Callum Baird; Nick "Skins" Sarnella

Violent Reaction were an English straight edge hardcore punk band. Originally a solo-project of Tom Pimlott in Liverpool, the band gained additional members after relocating to Leeds. In Straight Edge: A Clear-Headed Hardcore Punk History, Mike Clark cited them as one of the most important modern straight edge bands. They were a part of the New Wave of British Hardcore.

== History ==
Violent Reaction began as a solo-project of Tom Pimlott in Liverpool in 2011. Under the moniker, he released the Violent Reaction and Session One demos in 2011 on Mind Rot Records, Violent Reaction EP in 2012 through Quality Control HQ, 6131 Records and Mind Rot Records, and City Streets LP in 2013, through Painkiller Records. Soon after, Pimlott moved to Leeds, where he recruited additional musicians to help perform the music live. In 2013, they toured the U.S. in support of Hounds of Hate. In 2014, they did a U.S. tour, with support from the Flex. In 2015, they took part in a co-headline tour of the U.S. with Arms Race. They released their sophomore album Marching On on 31 March 2015 through Revelation Records, being the first non-American band to sign to the label. In June 2016, they announced that they would be breaking up at the end of the year, after a European tour with Arms Race.

== Musical style ==
The band merges American–style hardcore punk with elements of UK82 and Oi!. They have cited influences including Poison Idea, Out Cold, Negative Approach, State of Alert, Agnostic Front, Minor Threat, SSD, the 4 Skins, Blitz, 86 Mentality and Straight Ahead. They are considered a hardcore punk band. Peter Freyer of Slug Magazine described them as "Part Negative Approach, part U.K. street punk with a healthy amount of NYHC".

They have been cited as an influence by Yard Act.

== Band members ==
- Tom Pimlott – vocals (2011–2015)
- Tom "Razor" Hardwick – guitar (2013–2015)
- Charlie "Chubby Charles" Fresh – guitar, bass (2013–2015)
- Jimmy "J–Town" Wizard – bass, guitar (2013–2014)
- Callum Baird – bass (2014–2015)
- Nick "Skins" Sarnella – drums (2013–2015)

== Discography ==
Albums

- City Streets (2013)
- Marching On (2015)

EPs

- Violent Reaction (2012)
- Dead End (2014)

Demos

- Violent Reaction (2011)
- Session One (2011)
