= Outbreak Festival =

Punk festival

- Genre: Hardcore punk; metalcore; alternative rock; hip hop
- Dates: Various dates: September (2011, 2012–2013); January (2012); April (2014, 2016, 2017, 2019); May (2015, 2016); June (2018, 2022–present); October (2024)
- Locations: Various locations: Broomhall Centre, Sheffield (2011); the Well, Leeds (2012); Külturbahnof, Jülich, Germany (2012); the Vox, Leeds (2013–2014); Canal Mills, Leeds (2015–2019); Bowlers Exhibition Centre, Manchester (2022, 2024–present); Depot Mayfield, Manchester (2023); Victoria Park, London (2025–present)
- Years active: 2011–2019, 2022–present
- Capacity: 10,000
- Website: www.outbreak-fest.co.uk

Outbreak Festival is an English hardcore punk festival and concert promotion company founded by Jordan Coupland and Lee Follows in 2011. Beginning at the Broomhall Centre in Sheffield, the festival has moved between a number of different venues and cities throughout its existence: being held in Leeds from 2012 to 2019, at the Well (2012), the Vox (2013–2014) and Canal Mills (2015–2019); and in Manchester from 2022, at Bowlers Exhibition Centre (2022, 2024) and Depot Mayfield (2023). Over its 13 date runtime, the festival has become one of the most prominent events in hardcore punk in the United Kingdom, hosting the genre's biggest native acts like Higher Power, Malevolence and the Flex, as well as fundamental international groups including the Cro-Mags, Gorilla Biscuits, Terror, Turnstile, Trapped Under Ice and Code Orange.

== History ==
=== 2011 ===
Outbreak Festival began in 2011, founded by fourteen year old Jordan Coupland and Lee Fellows. This first iteration took place on Saturday 10 September 2011, and was held in Sheffield at the Broomhall Centre.

Saturday 10 September 2011

Brutality Will Prevail
Deal With It
Fastpoint
Hang the Bastard
Broken Teeth
By My Hands
Bays
Cornered
Crossbreakers
Wayfarer
Ironclad
Wardogs
Final Rage
Think Twice
Iron x Curtain

=== 2012 ===
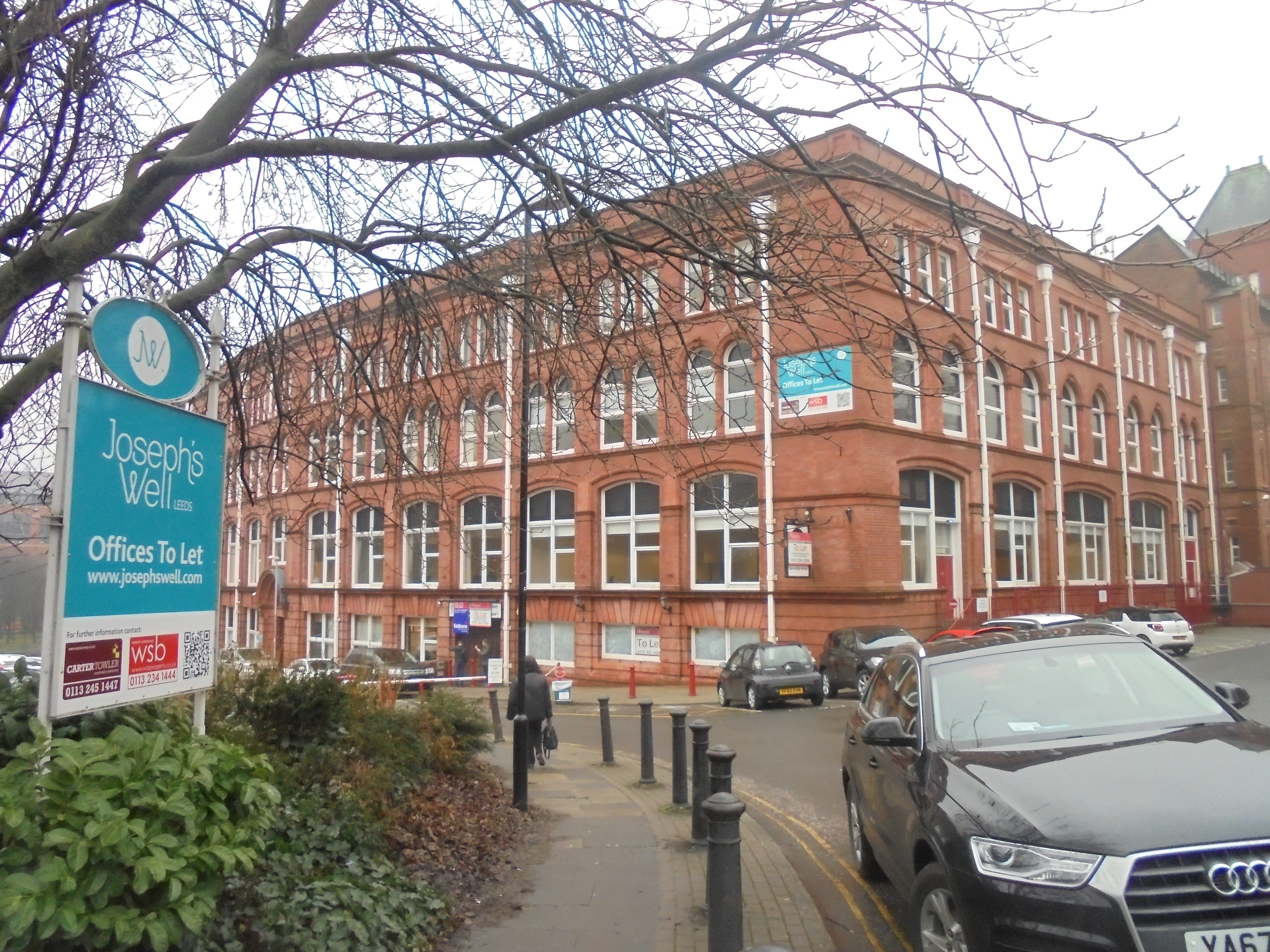
The Well in Leeds, the venue which hosted both UK Outbreak festivals in 2012

==== January ====
The festival moved to the Well in Leeds for its second iteration, which took place on 8 January 2012. This move took place because the Broomhall Centre was not a registered music venue, meaning the event was risking being shut down by authorities.

Sunday 8 January 2012

Harm's Way
Brutality Will Prevail
Dead End Path
New Morality
Broken Teeth
Breaking Point
Wayfarer
Guilty
Final Rage
Iron X Curtain
Survival
Splitcase
Speak Up

==== September ====
Leeds

The third edition of Outbreak Festival was held between 22 and 23 September 2012 at the Well in Leeds. On Friday 21 September, a pre-show was held headlined by Grazes with support from xCurraheex, Trial & Error, Rough Justice and the Pact. The pre-show served as the final show for Grazes and xCurraheex before their disbandment. When the show was originally announced in August 2012, it was also meant to be the final show for Speak Up with support from Bleak Reality and Outrage CC.

Saturday 22 September 2012

Knuckledust
Hang the Bastard
By My Hands
Prowler
Survival
New Lows
Full of Hell
New Morality
AYS
Inherit
Think Twice
Forsaken
Nibiru
The Flex

Sunday 23 September 2012

Frustration
Breaking Point
xAbolitionx
Ark of the Covenant
Natural Order
Landscapes
Splitcase
Final Rage
Blindside
Speak Up
Burnt Earth
Bleak Reality
Your Move

Jülich

On 29 September 2012, a "European Edition" of Outbreak Festival took place at Külturbahnof in Jülich, Germany.

Saturday 29 September 2012

Brutality Will Prevail
Broken Teeth
Desolated
Survival
xEisbergx
New Lows
Blindside
In Circles
Full of Hell
Demonwomb
Done
Hieroglyphs
Trapjaw

=== 2013 ===
Outbreak Festival 2013 moved venues to the Vox in Leeds, following the Well's 2012 closure. This date was the UK live debut from festival regulars Turnstile, and at the time, the furthest they had played from their home in Baltimore. The Saturday featured Final Rage's final performance before their disbandment.

Saturday 14 September 2013

Incendiary
Mindset
Broken Teeth
xAbolitionx
Breaking Point
Inherit
Risk It!
Final Rage
Ego Trip
The Flex
Obstruct
Violent Reaction
Fade
Natural Order
Cement

Sunday 15 September 2013

Turnstile
Frustration
Forsaken
Malevolence
Prowler
Blindside
Cornered
Bang Bro's
Nai Harvest
Moose Blood
Bleak Reality
War Charge
Below
Mind X Control
Insist

=== 2014 ===
Sunday 13 April 2014

Cold World
Backtrack
Stick Together
No Turning Back
Take Offense
Survival
Wardogs
Wolf Down
Eisberg
Nai Harvest
Mind x Control
Headroom
World Eater
Strange Places

=== 2015 ===
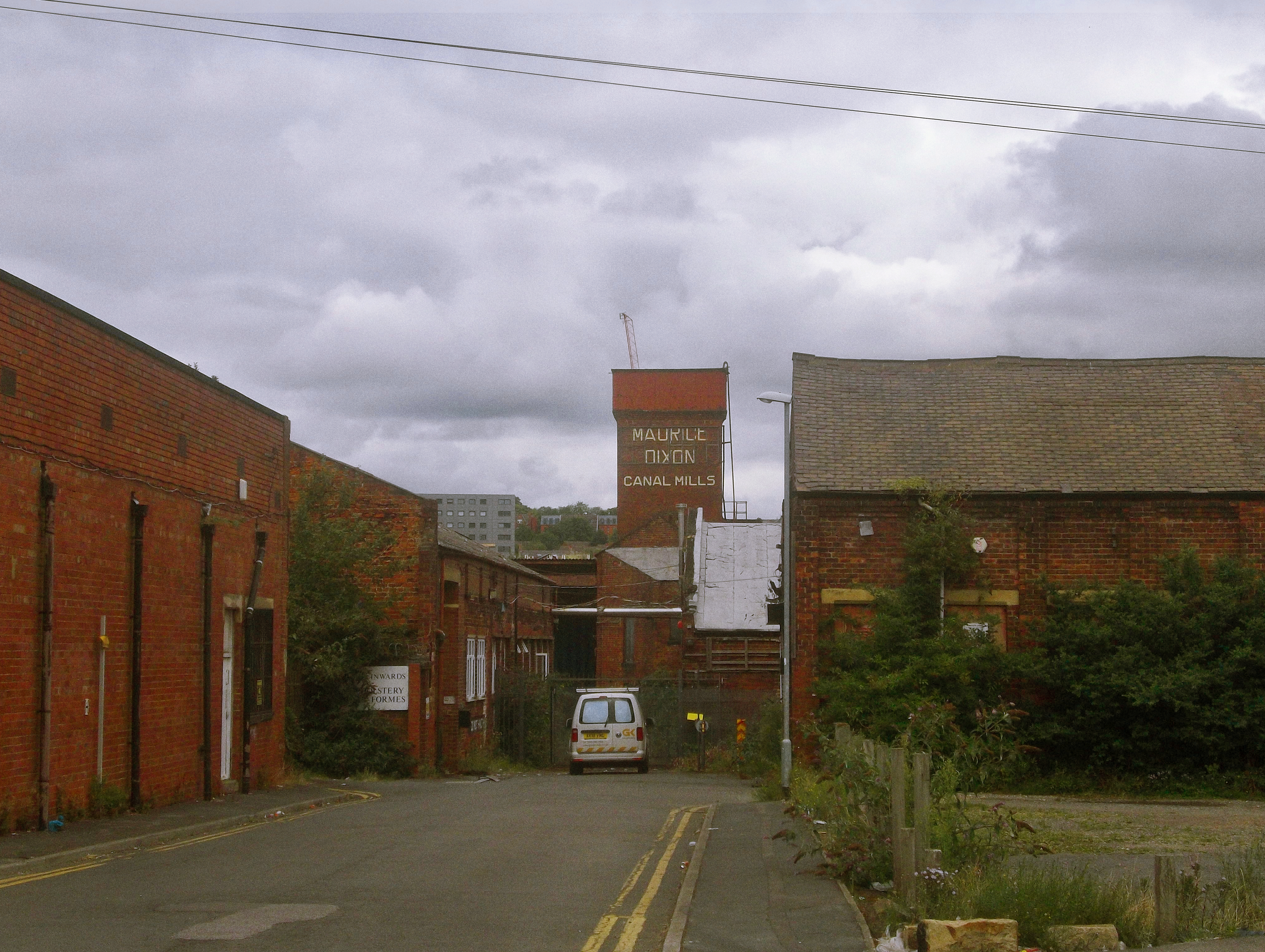
Canal Mills in Leeds, the venue where Outbreak Festivals 2015–2019 were held

The Vox announced its closure at the beginning of 2015, leading to Outbreak Festival needing to relocate. The promoters originally intended to move to Canal Mills in the Armley area of Leeds, although the date at the time was not available, so it began to be organised at Control in Burley, Leeds. However, the date at Canal Mills soon became available, leading to Outbreak Festival 2015 taking place there instead. Between Angel Dust and Broken Teeth's sets, a brief, impromptu set by Higher Power took place.

Sunday 3 May 2015

Title Fight
Basement
Cold World
Turnstile
Justice
Survival
Broken Teeth
Higher Power (Note: Higher Power's set was brief and unannounced, taking place during the changeover time between Angel Dust and Broken Teeth.)
Angel Dust
Headroom
Milk Teeth
Drug Church
Not Afraid
Insist
Shrapnel

=== 2016 ===
Outbreak 2016's Saturday took place on 30 April, while its Sunday was eight days later on 8 May. The Saturday featured a one-off reunion set by Dead Swans, while its Sunday had the same for Dirty Money. Sunday was also one of only four dates which Trapped Under Played in 2016, and was the only one not in continental Europe.

Saturday 30 April 2016

Terror
Dead Swans
Incendiary
Malevolence
xRepetencex
Reflect
Rough Justice
Splitknuckle

Sunday 8 May 2016

Trapped Under Ice
Dirty Money
Survival
xReptenencex
Higher Power
Renounced
Blind Authority
Insist
Revulsion
Bitter Youth
Mercy
Adjust
Frame of Mind
Riot Conduct

=== 2017 ===
Outbreak Festival 2017 took place between 29 and 30 April, at Canal Mills. It was originally announced that one of the headliners would be a reunited Turning Point featuring Tim Mcmahon of Mouthpiece on vocals, in tribute to the band's vocalist Frank 'Skip' Candelori who died in 2002, however Turning Point did not play the final event.

Saturday 29 April 2017

Gorilla Biscuits
Title Fight
Breakdown
Fury
Freedom
The Flex
Higher Power
Insist
Bitter Youth
Bent Life
Blind Authority
Frame of Mind
Rapture

Sunday 30 April 2017

Cro-Mags
Knuckledust
Broken Teeth
Mizery
Renounced
Revulsion
Splitknuckle
Guilt Trip
Chamber
Firm Standing Law
Stranded
Pledge
Outreach

=== 2018 ===
On 15 June 2018, a pre-show took place at the Temple of Boom featuring Payday, Rough Justice, Last Wishes, Insist, Revulsion and Blind Authority. The festival took place at Canal Mills on 16 and 17 June.

Saturday 16 June 2018

Turnstile
Floorpunch
Fury
Angel Dust
Higher Power
The Flex
Jesus Piece
Year of the Knife
Protestor
Line of Sight
Big Cheese
Odd Man Out
Cheap Surgery

Sunday 17 June 2018

Code Orange
Cro-Mags
Broken Teeth
Twitching Tongues
Vein
Renounced
Chamber
Existence
xServitudex
Slope
All Fear Death

=== 2019 ===
Sunday 28 April 2019

Comeback Kid
Citizen
One King Down
Defeater
Backtrack
Such Gold
Jesus Piece
King Nine
Revulsion
Candy
Splitknuckle
Sharptooth
Last Wishes

Outbreak Festival also organised Have Heart's two 2019 reunion shows in Leeds, both taking place on 21 July. The first one announced had support from Abuse of Power, Big Cheese, Payday and Stages in Faith. After that show sold out, a matinee show was announced with support from the Flex, Mil-Spec and World of Difference. Furthermore, they organised Backtrack's final UK show before their disbandment. Taking place at the Brudenell Social Club, the event took place on 9 November 2019, with support from Higher Power, Hangman, Last Wishes and Greed.

=== 2020–2021 ===
On 9 February 2020, it was announced that for Outbreak Festival 2020, the festival would relocate to the Leadmill in Sheffield, and would be headlined by Knocked Loose. Additional bands announced for the year included Trapped Under Ice, Terror, Incendiary All Out War, Broken Teeth, Fury, Fiddlehead, Renounced, SeeYouSpaceCowboy, Ecostrike, Magnitude, Antagonize, Young Guv, One Step Closer and Anxious. However, this year did not take place due to the 2020 COVID-19 lockdown in the United Kingdom. On 1 September 2020, the festival announced Knocked Loose as the headliners of Outbreak Festival 2021, alongside Madball, Youth of Today, Vein.fm, All Out War, Higher Power, Fiddlehead, Incendiary, Xibalba, Sanction, Renounced, Broken Teeth, Drain, Narrow Head, Young Guv and High Vis. The announcement stated the festival would take place between 25 and 27 June 2021 and would be held at the Bowlers Exhibition Centre in Manchester. This date also never took place due to COVID-19 lockdowns.

=== 2022 ===
On 8 December 2021, Every Time I Die were announced as a headliner, however the band disbanded before the festival took place. At the same time Chubby and the Gang were announced to play, however they too dropped out before the event took place. Venom Prison, Rotting Out, Modern Life Is War, Madball, God's Hate and Youth of Today also dropped out before the festival took place.

This iteration was the first year the festival took place at the Bowlers Exhibition Centre in Manchester, selling out the venue's 5,000 person capacity. The year's pre-show took place on Thursday 23 June, and featured last-minute headliners Counterparts, with support from SeeYouSpaceCowboy, Static Dress, Modern Error and Guilt Trip. Stick to Your Guns were originally booked to headline this pre-show, however were dropped from the bill on 7 June following comments made by Jesse Barnett about the Russo-Ukrainian War. Over the weekend the premises was also home to an art exhibit and a skate ramp. Friday was the final date of Your Demise's ten year anniversary reunion, as well as featuring a secret set by Malevolence. On the Saturday, Basement performed a tenth anniversary set for their albums I Wish I Could Stay Here (2011) Colourmeinkindness (2012). Additionally, in a tent stage, Ray Harkins, host of the 1000 Words or Less podcast, interviewed Nate Rebolledo of Xibalba, Bryan Garris of Knocked Loose, Olli Appleyard of Static Dress and Brendan Garrone of Incendiary on the Friday; Mat Kerekes of Citizen, Isa Holliday of Slowcrush, Jimmy Wizard of Higher Power, Walter Schreifels of bands including Youth of Today, Gorilla Biscuits and Quicksand, and producer Will Yip on Saturday; and Kat Moss of Scowl, Anaiah Lei and Dez Yusuf of Zulu, Daniel Tracy of Deafheaven, Anthony Alzando of Ceremony, Kadeem France of Loathe and Nicky "Money" Palmero of Nothing on Sunday.

Friday 24 June 2022
Main Stage	Second Stage
Knocked Loose; Terror; Malevolence (Note: Malevolence's set was unannounced and listed on official times as "Secret Guests".); Your Demise; Last Witness; Static Dress; Incendiary; Xibalba; Renounced; Year of the Knife	Puppy; The Flex; Pest Control; Last Wishes; Despize; Oversize

Saturday 25 June 2022
Main Stage	Second Stage
Turnstile; Basement; Citizen; Higher Power; Movements; Angel Dust; Drug Church; Mannequin Pussy; Fiddlehead; Narrow Head; Powerplant	Slow Crush; High Vis; Young Guv; Big Cheese; Dead Heat; Life's Question; Island of Love; Micromoon

Sunday 26 June 2022
Main Stage	Second Stage
Touché Amoré; Deafheaven; Ceremony; Vein.fm; Injury Reserve; Loathe; Nothing; Superheaven; Show Me the Body; Drain; Anxious; Zulu; Scowl	One Step Closer; Militarie Gun; Soft Kill; Choir Boy; Chastity; Witch Fever; Nekra; Dare

=== 2023 ===
On 27 June 2022, Outbreak Festival announced that 2023's festival would take place at Depot Mayfield, a venue with a capacity of 10,000. Outbreak 2023's lineup saw the festival put a greater emphasis on hip hop music than before, with both Denzel Curry and Death Grips as headliners alongside hardcore bands Converge and Bane. On Thursday 22 June, a sold out pre-show took place at the Bread Shed and organised by Concrete Culture. It was headlined by One Step Closer, with support from Higher Power, the Flex, Fate, Despize, Dynamite and the second live performance by Nix. During the weekend there was an art exhibition curated by Screw Gallery and a free on-premise Uppercut Deluxe hairdressers. Friday was headlined by a reunited Bane, the festival was the only European date on their 2023 reunion tour. On the Sunday, a live episode of Knotfest's Hardlore podcast, hosted by Harm's Way's Bo Lueders and Twitching Tongues' Colin Young was recorded in front of an audience of festivalgoers at Manchester's Star and Garter pub.

Friday 23 June 2023
Main Stage	Second Stage
Bane; Converge; Defeater; High Vis; One Step Closer; Militarie Gun; No Pressure; Koyo; Fleshwater; Sunami; Pest Control	Spy; Pain of Truth; Restraining Order; Rough Justice; TS Warspite; Demonstration of Power; C4; Existence; Mercury

Saturday 24 June 2023
Main Stage	Second Stage
Death Grips; Code Orange; Machine Girl; Jesus Piece; Soul Glo; Mike; Armand Hammer; Fury; Scowl; Narrow Head; Candy	Wu-Lu; Denzel Himself; Sam Akpro; Nukuluk; Isaiah Hull; Taliable; Micro Moon; Speedway; Middleman

Sunday 25 June 2023
Main Stage	Second Stage
Denzel Curry; Earl Sweatshirt; Turnover; Trapped Under Ice; Loathe; Lil Ugly Mane; Show Me the Body; Meechy Darko; Playthatiboizay; Speed; Zulu	Wiki; Lord Apex; Sam Wise; Jeshi; Ekkstacy; Deijuhvs; Tom the Mailman; Buggin

=== 2024 ===
==== June ====
Outbreak Festival 2024's first announcement was 15 December 2023 which included the information that the festival would return to Bowlers Exhibition Centre in Manchester. Balance and Composure were originally scheduled to play on Saturday, but due to travel issues their set had to be moved to Sunday.

Friday 28 June 2024

Action Bronson
JPEGMafia
Flatbush Zombies
The Garden
Redveil
Mavi
King Isis

Saturday 29 June 2024
Main Stage	Second Stage	Third Stage
Have Heart; Basement; Touché Amoré; Poison the Well; Ceremony; Nothing; Higher Power; Glare; Truth Club; Thirdface	Show Me the Body; Chat Pile; Mindforce; Magnitude; Never Ending Game; Jivebomb; Taqbir; Bodyweb; Gridiron; Scarab; Missing Link	Bib; Dynamite; Jive Bomb; Stiff Meds; Perp Walk; Speedway; Plastics; Crushed

Sunday 30 June 2024
Main Stage	Second Stage	Third stage
American Football; Soccer Mommy; Hot Mulligan; Balance and Composure; Joyce Manor; Movements; Mannequin Pussy; The Hotelier; Fiddlehead; Angel Dust; The World Is a Beautiful Place & I Am No Longer Afraid to Die	Thursday; Harms Way; Incendiary; Teenage Wrist; Modern Color; Gouge Away; Split Chain; Sweet Pill; Wrong Man; Spite House; Bug Bath	Demonstration of Power; Despize; Impunity; Nothin' But Enemies; Hellbound; Killing Me Softly; Kute

==== October ====
On 15 May 2024, it was announced that a one-day Autumn edition of Outbreak Festival would take place on 27 October at Bowlers Exhibition Centre, Manchester.

Sunday 27 October 2024
Main Stage	Second Stage
The Story So Far; Citizen; Speed; Angel Dust; Narrow Head; Fleshwater; Pest Control; Trauma Ray; End It	Fucked Up; Horse Jumper of Love; Enumclaw; Armlock; T.S. Warspite; Whispers

=== 2025 ===
On 11 November 2024, it was announced that Outbreak Festival 2025 would take place in two separate locations: in London on 13 June 2025 and Manchester on 14 and 15 June 2025.

On 27 November 2024, the first wave of lineup announced for the festival was released. Glassjaw performed their second album Worship and Tribute in full on Saturday 14 June, their debut album Everything You Ever Wanted To Know About Silence in full on Sunday 15 June, and a mix of songs from both albums on Friday 13 June.

==== London ====
Friday 13 June 2025
Main Stage	Stage 2	The Club
Turnstile; Alex G Danny Brown; Julie; Fleshwater; Momma; Maudi Sama	Knocked Loose; Glassjaw; Superheaven; Speed; Drug Church; Kumo 99	Sunny Day Real Estate; Have a Nice Life; Model/Actriz; Jane Remover; Feeble Little Horse; They Are Gutting a Body of Water

==== Manchester ====
Saturday 14 June
Main Stage	Stage 2	Stage 3
Alex G Slowdive; Sunny Day Real Estate; Julie; Fleshwater; Militarie Gun; Momma	Danny Brown; Glassjaw; Have a Nice Life; Maruja; Model/Actriz; Jane Remover; Feeble Little Horse; They Are Gutting a Body of Water	Tigers Jaw; Gouge Away; Foxing; Spy; Witch Fever; Kumo 99; Gleemer; Mitsubishi Suicide; University; Kissing on Camera; Final Resting Place; Ikhras

Sunday 15 June 2025
Main Stage	Stage 2	Stage 3
Knocked Loose; Denzel Curry; Superheaven; Speed; Drug Church; Pest Control; Jivebomb	Glassjaw; Deafheaven; Terror; Sunami; Pain of Truth; God's Hate; Big Boy; XweaponX	Splitknuckle; Impunity; Extinguish; Contention; Long Goodbye; Oversize; Cruelty; Stiff Meds; Blade; Chamber; No Relief; Kenya

=== 2026 ===
In the early hours of 27 June, Knocked Loose will perform headline the festival aftershow, at Albert Hall, Manchester, supporting by Lip Critic.

On 10 and 11 July, a week after the festival, Outbreak hosted Bring Me the Horizon's release shows for Count Your Blessings: Repented, with support by Static Dress, Rolo Tomassi, Dying Wish, Heriot, Still in Love and Car Underwater.

==== June ====
Friday 26 June
Main Stage	Indoor Stage
The Front Bottoms; Joyce Manor; Balance and Composure; Tigers Jaw; Free Throw; Pool Kids	Algernon Cadwallader; Love Rarely; Tooth; Kissing On Camera

Saturday 27 June
Main Stage	Indoor Stage	Stage 3
Alexisonfire; Loathe; Pup; High Vis; Touché Amoré; Static Dress (Note: Static Dress performed as a part of a secret set. They were unlisted on promotional material. When set times were announced, they were listed as "???"); Reclus.É; East Exchange	Converge; Quicksand; The Armed; Higher Power; I Promised the World; Greet Death; Lip Critic; Thistle; Bodyweb; Truck Violence	Shady Nasty; Knives; Tummyache; Upchuck; Sunbrella; Love is Noise; Still in Love; Blanket; Turn of Phrase

Sunday 28 June 2026
Main Stage	Indoor Stage	Stage 3
Basement; Trapped Under Ice; Snail Mail; La Dispute; Fiddlehead; Nothing; Ecca Vandal; Glare	Suicidal Tendencies; Hatebreed; Trash Talk; Haywire; End It; Dynamite; Gridiron; Crowquill	Glitterer; Febuary; Midrift; Glixen; Death Lens; Big Problem; Ingrown; Initiate

==== August ====
Outbreak Festival London will take place on 23 August in Victoria Park, Tower Hamlets.

Deftones
Idles
Amyl and the Sniffers
Interpol
AFI
Esdeekid
Jpegmafia
Yousuke Yukimatsu
Salem
Basement
Wisp
Deafheaven
Show Me the Body
Mannequin Pussy
Blawan Live
Ecca Vandal
Brooki
Clarion
Kenny Mason
Overgrown
Reclus.É
Tooth
Vilanelle

== Reception ==
In an article discussing Outbreak Festival 2018, NME writer Tom Connick credited the festival with being one of the main locations for hardcore internationally, as well as one of only a few that prove subcultures have continued to exist into the age of the internet, going on in another article to call it "surely a highlight of the year". Kerrang! writer Sam Law called Outbreak Festival 2022 the "kind of show [that] wasn't just a watershed moment for the UK scene, but for hardcore on a global scale", while a 2023 article by Huck magazine called its 2023 iteration "the heart and soul of hardcore".

When the festival began to put an emphasis on hip hop artists in 2023, it received some backlash from fans of hardcore. However, this same lineup was praised by Metal Hammer for being the most prominent heavy music festival to embrace a high number of women and people of colour in its lineup, with writer Stephen Hill calling the festival the leaders of "a quiet revolution".
