= Sick New World =

American metal music festival

- Inaugural festival poster
- Genre: Heavy metal; nu metal; alternative metal; metalcore; industrial; gothic rock
- Dates: May 8, 2023; April 27, 2024; April 12, 2025 (canceled); April 25, 2026
- Locations: Las Vegas Festival Grounds, Winchester, Nevada, U.S.
- Years active: 2023–present
- Founders: Live Nation Entertainment
- Website: www.sicknewworldfest.com

Sick New World is an annual heavy metal music festival held at the Las Vegas Festival Grounds in Winchester, Nevada. The first edition took place in 2023. The festival was co-created by David "Beno" Benveniste and Live Nation Entertainment, and is operated by Live Nation's subsidiary C3 Presents in partnership with Benveniste's Velvet Hammer Music and Management Group, and is described as the "sister festival" to the pop-punk oriented When We Were Young festival which is run by the same company and takes place at the same location.

== History ==
The lineup for the inaugural Sick New World festival was revealed on November 7, 2022. Its lineup drew attention for its nu metal focus and featured System of a Down headlining in their only performance of 2023, alongside artists such as Korn, Deftones and Incubus on the main stages. Consequence noted the presence of other genres such as industrial with Ministry, Skinny Puppy and KMFDM, as well as the gothic rock of The Sisters of Mercy (who were playing their first US tour in 15 years), The 69 Eyes and Ville Valo. Stereogum said the festival brought together "some of the biggest names in Y2K-era nu-metal with others from the expanded alt-metal/heavy alternative world, topped off with some hip young acts from the hardcore and electronic worlds." The festival took place on May 8, 2023 at the Las Vegas Festival Grounds with artists performing on four stages: the main "Purple" and "Green" stages which alternate performances and the smaller "Spiral" and "Sick" stages which saw artists perform with no interruptions between sets.

The second edition took place on April 27, 2024 and was headlined by System of a Down and Slipknot. Other prominent bands included A Perfect Circle, Alice in Chains, Bring Me the Horizon, Danny Elfman, Swans, Slowdive and Primus. The festival included metalcore with Knocked Loose, Drain and Code Orange while expanding its genre offerings to shoegaze and slowcore, among others. The festival added a fifth stage, and the Las Vegas Weekly noted how the stages were loosely thematic, with the tented Diablo Stage hosting the hardcore-leaning bands, while the Siren Stage focused on the industrial and gothic artists.

The third edition was scheduled to take place on April 12, 2025, headlined by Metallica and Linkin Park. It also planned to feature the reunion of Acid Bath, who broke up in 1997. However, on November 29, 2024, the festival announced that its 2025 edition was canceled. Earlier that week, Tomahawk bassist Trevor Dunn claimed on a podcast that the festival would not happen, forcing the band to scrap its upcoming tour, which had been planned around the festival, for financial reasons.

The festival began teasing its return in October 2025, updating their website featuring Las Vegas and Texas waitlists. At a signing for his art book Visual Resonance, Serj Tankian confirmed that System of a Down would be there. The festival officially announced its return that month. The Las Vegas festival took place on April 25, 2026, and the Fort Worth, TX festival taking place on October 24, 2026. System of a Down is headlining both, with Korn co-headlining in Vegas and Deftones co-headlining in Texas.

== Lineups ==
Year	Stage	Performers
2023	Purple Stage	System of a Down, Deftones, Evanescence, Chevelle, Death Grips, Flyleaf, P.O.D.
2023	Green Stage	Korn, Incubus, Turnstile, Mr. Bungle, Papa Roach, Soulfly, Alien Ant Farm
2023	Spiral Stage	The Sisters of Mercy, Ville Valo, Placebo, Ministry, She Wants Revenge, Skinny Puppy, KMFDM, Filter, Melvins, Stabbing Westward, Lacuna Coil, The Birthday Massacre, London After Midnight, The 69 Eyes, Orgy, Cold
2023	Sick Stage	Cradle of Filth, Prayers, Machine Girl, Health, Ho99o9, Fever 333, My Life with the Thrill Kill Kult, Loathe, 100 gecs, Hoobastank, Body Count, Spiritbox, Sevendust, Kittie, Coal Chamber, Panchiko, Superheaven, Fiddlehead, Narrow Head, Scene Queen, Scowl
2024	Gold Stage	System of a Down, Bring Me the Horizon, Alice in Chains, Bad Omens, Lamb of God, Ice Nine Kills, Spiritbox, Nonpoint
2024	Red Stage	Slipknot, Danny Elfman, A Perfect Circle, Primus, Babymetal, Lorna Shore, Kittie
2024	Spiral Stage	Sleep Token, Black Veil Brides, Wage War, Sevendust, Jinjer, Motionless in White, Static-X, Slaughter to Prevail, Dope, Dayseeker, Skindred, Taproot, Helmet, Powerman 5000, Fear Factory, Paleface Swiss, Wednesday 13, Violent Vira
2024	Siren Stage	Swans, Slowdive, Polyphia, The Garden, Duster, Knocked Loose, Have a Nice Life, Nitzer Ebb, Front 242, Front Line Assembly, VNV Nation, Lords of Acid, She Past Away, Combichrist, 3Teeth, Vowws, Kim Dracula, 6arelyhuman, Quannnic, Snow Strippers
2024	Diablo Stage	Incendiary, Static Dress, Better Lovers, Code Orange, Vein.fm, Drain, Kublai Khan, Loathe, Fleshwater, Sunami, Superheaven, Trash Talk, Drop Nineteens, Ultra Sunn, Gel, Zulu, Spy, Fury, Glare
2025	Cancelled	Metallica, Linkin Park, Queens of the Stone Age, Evanescence, Ministry, 311, AFI, The Sisters of Mercy, Gojira, Acid Bath, The Flaming Lips, Daron Malakian and Scars on Broadway, Down, Three Days Grace, Cannibal Corpse, Meshuggah, Tomahawk, Melvins, Testament, Mastodon, Refused, Filter, Cradle of Filth, Terror, Mayhem, X, Underoath, The Hives, Carcass, Kittie, Poison the Well, Mudvayne, Exodus, Machine Head, Arch Enemy, Twin Tribes, Quicksand, Sponge, Dir En Grey, Static-X, Erra, Stabbing Westward, Rendez-Vous, Dethklok, Orgy, Lacuna Coil, The Birthday Massacre, Nuovo Testamento, Scowl, Dope, Show Me the Body, Amira Elfeky, Lebanon Hanover, Napalm Death, Seven Hours After Violet, Vision Video
2026 (Las Vegas)	Purple Stage	Speed of Light, Failure, P.O.D., Mastodon, AFI, Marilyn Manson, Bring Me The Horizon, System of a Down
2026 (Las Vegas)	Green Stage	Violent Vira, Filter, Acid Bath, Cypress Hill, Knocked Loose, Evanescence, Korn
2026 (Las Vegas)	Spiral Stage	Chained Saint, VOWWS, Snot, Orgy, Alien Ant Farm, Lords of Acid, Kittie, Twin Tribes, Sleep Theory, Carpenter Brut, Coal Chamber, Melvins, She Wants Revenge, Clutch, Ministry, Danny Elfman
2026 (Las Vegas)	Diablo Stage	Flatwounds, Showing Teeth, The Dark.FM, TSS, End It, Corrosion of Conformity, Bloodywood, Norma Jean, Speed, Sunami, Pig Pen, Health, Deafheaven, Terror and Pain of Truth, Superheaven, Wage War, Glassjaw, Poison the Well, Underoath
2026 (Las Vegas)	Cancelled	Better Lovers, Ego Kill Talent, KMFDM, Scowl
2026 (Texas)	Blue Stage	Speed of Light, Failure, Filter, Power Trip, AFI, Marilyn Manson, Slayer, System of a Down
2026 (Texas)	Gold Stage	Amira Elfeky, Dying Wish, P.O.D., Mastodon, Knocked Loose, Evanescence, Deftones
2026 (Texas)	Spiral Stage	Showing Teeth, Snot, Orgy, Alien Ant Farm, Violent Vira, Kittie, Lords of Acid, Twin Tribes, Coal Chamber, Melvins, She Wants Revenge, Clutch, Down, Ministry, Boy Harsher, The Prodigy
2026 (Texas)	Diablo Stage	Dead City, The Dark.FM, The Tony Danza Tapdance Extravaganza, Ego Kill Talent, TSS, Pain of Truth, PeelingFlesh, Haywire, Norma Jean, Speed, Sleep Theory, Superheaven, Terror, Deafheaven, Sunami, Glassjaw, Underoath, Wage War, Poison the Well

== See also ==
- Hell's Heroes (music festival)
- Big Texas Music Fest
