= Farida =

Farida may refer to:

- Farida (given name)
- Farida Force, an ad hoc Australian Army unit formed in World War II
- Farida Group, a leather manufacturing company in Chennai, India
- Farida Guitars, a Chinese musical instrument manufacturer
- Fareedan, a fictional character played by Sonakshi Sinha in the 2024 Indian television series Heeramandi
  - "Fareedanjaan: The Challenger Returns", the second episode of the TV series

== See also ==
- Farid (disambiguation)
