= Bodyweb =

English hardcore punk band

- Origin: Leeds, West Yorkshire, U.K.
- Genres: Nu metalcore; hardcore punk
- Years active: 2022–present
- Labels: Northern Unrest, Flatspot
- Spinoff of: Higher Power; Pest Control; Big Cheese; Nihiloxica
- Members: Louis Hardy; Pete Jones; Luke Thompson; Naomi Macleod; Tom Hobson
- Past members: Ethan Wilkinson; Ben Jones

Bodyweb are an English hardcore punk band from Leeds, West Yorkshire. Formed in 2022 by guitarist/vocalist Louis Hardy (of Higher Power) and drummer Ben Jones (of Pest Control), by 2023 they had hired bassist Ethan Wilkinson (of Higher Power) and electronics player Pete "PQ" Jones (of electro-Baganda group Nihiloxica). They released their debut EP Train_Wreck_Simulation that year. In 2025, they released their second EP Deadwired, which saw a lineup change to Hardy (vocals), Pete Jones (electronics), Luke Thompson (drums), Naomi Macleod (bass) and Tom Hobson (guitar). The band's fusion of hardcore punk and nu metalcore with electronic music genres such as jungle and hardstyle put them at the front of a wave of genre-fluid bands in the British hardcore scene.

== History ==
Bodyweb was formed in Leeds in February 2022, when Louis Hardy (vocals/guitar) of Higher Power and Big Cheese began writing music with Ben Jones (drums) of Pest Control. During this time, they would record their music at the members' homes and Millwright Studios. The duo felt these recordings lacked electronic music elements, leading Hardy to contact his childhood friend Pete "PQ" Jones, a member of Kampala-based electro-Baganda group Nihiloxica. Pete Jones flew to the United Kingdom to record synthesiser parts soon after. Their full-band lineup was completed by then hiring Ethan Wilkinson of Higher Power.

They released their debut EP Train_Wreck_Simulation on 16 June 2023 through Northern Unrest. They were featured on Static Dress' EP Rouge Carpet Disaster (Redux) Volume 2, released on 20 October 2023. Bodyweb supported Static Dress on the EP's release tour, alongside World of Pleasure. On 26 June 2024, they released the single "Pull the Plug".

On 24 July 2025, they released the single "Deadwire" and announced that they had signed to Flatspot Records, who would release their second EP Deadwired on 5 September. At this time, they recruited Stiff Meds' Luke Thompson (drums), Empire State Bastard's Naomi Macleod (bass) and Tom Hobson (guitar), and Hardy took on only vocal duties. Of this lineup, The Line of Best Fit called them "a bit of a supergroup". The single was accompanied by a music video. On 13 August, they released its second single "Sugarcoated". Between 11 and 24 September 2025, they toured Europe supporting Poison the Well alongside Killing Me Softly. Between 15 and 22 April 2026, they supported Speed on their UK headline tour, alongside Whispers. During this tour, they mentioned they were preparing their next release. On 27 June, they performed at Outbreak Festival. In the following days, they support Knocked Loose on their UK headline tour.

== Musical style ==
Critics have categorised Bodyweb's music as hardcore punk, nu metalcore and nu hardcore. Their music is genre-fluid, incorporating elements of grungegaze, grunge, electronic music, hardstyle, jungle music, djent, funk music, metallic hardcore, beatdown hardcore and shoegaze.

Their songs often merge the low-pitch, palm-muted guitar riffs of metalcore with harsh vocals of nu metal and grunge-inspired melodic singing. They use both screamed vocals and clean singing. Their songs are often rhythmic, particularly through the use of the groove riffs of nu metal. They also use chromatic riffs, modern hardcore-stylised breakdowns and technical chord shapes. Their songs often put an emphasis on electronic elements, particularly, drum breaks, programming, sad, ambient synthesisers, sound design, clicky, sampled drums sound effects and cyberpunk-inspired sampling. Their lyrics discuss mental health, religion and domestic abuse.

Boolin Tunes writer Amy Shephard described their music as being "as danceable as it is guttural", while Stereoboard writer Emma Wilkes described them as "If Slipknot started in the 2020s and found themselves pulled towards hardcore more than metal".

In a 2025 interview, Hardy cited his time as a touring member of Vein.fm as what "turned the key in my head" to create Bodyweb, also citing Code Orange and Disembodied. Other influences they have cited include Slipknot, Björk, Stalaggh, Aphex Twin, Venetian Snares, Dystopia, Brian Eno, Michael Andrews, Radiohead, Ross Robinson's 1990s production works, Team Sleep, and 1990s and 2000s metalcore and emo. They have also cited the video game Half Life 2, movies including The Killing of a Sacred Deer, Irréversible and Lilya 4-ever and the filmmaker Gaspar Noe, as influences upon their music During some live shows, they cover Slipknot's "Wait and Bleed".

Bodyweb have been cited as an influence by Heriot, Static Dress, Split Chain and Love is Noise.

Bodyweb are a part of a wave of bands in the British hardcore into more experimental territories, alongside Static Dress and Rozemary. Alternative Press noted them as one "of the most exciting rising artists to watch in 2026". Consequence called their song "Deadwire" an "essential track". By 2025, they were one of the most prominent bands in hardcore punk in the United Kingdom.

== Discography ==
EPs

- Train_Wreck_Simulation (2023)
- Deadwired (2025)

== Members ==
Current

- Louis Hardy – vocals (2022–present), guitar (2022–2025)
- Pete "PQ" Jones – electronics (2023–present)
- Luke Thompson – drums (2025–present)
- Naomi Macleod (2025–present)
- Tom Hobson – guitar (2025–present)

Former

- Ethan Wilkinson – bass (2023–2025)
- Ben Jones – drums (2022–2025)
