= Broken Teeth =

English hardcore punk band

- Origin: Manchester, England
- Genres: Hardcore punk; metalcore; crossover thrash
- Years active: 2007–2020
- Labels: Nuclear Blast, Power Negi, Purgatory, 6131, Reality
- Members: Dale Graham; Dave Egan; Laurent Huys; Lawrence Hegge; Adam Kelly
- Past members: Euan Lees; Paolo Passerini; Matt Weston; Nial Moran; Sean Logan

Broken Teeth (also known as Broken Teeth HC) were an English hardcore punk band formed in Manchester in 2007. The band have released one studio album and four EPs.

== History ==
Adam Kelly and Dale Graham formed Broken Teeth in 2007, with Kelly having only begun playing drums that year. They performed their first show three weeks later with Dave Egan on guitar, performing music inspired by the sound of the late–1990s Merauder. In 2012, the band released the Ain't No Rest for the Wicked EP through Reality Records, followed by a U.K. headline tour with support from Survival and Splitcase in April. In May 2012, they opened for Backtrack on their U.K. headline tour then opened for Survival on their European headline tour. In April 2014, they opened for Your Demise. On 5 May 2016, they released a full-length album, At Peace Amongst Chaos, through Nuclear Blast Records. In June 2016, they opened for Testament on their U.K. headline tour. In August 2016, they opened for Sick of It All on their U.K. tour. On 6 October 2016, they played Sound and Fury Festival in Los Angeles. In January 2017, they set out on a headline tour of Europe in support of At Peace Amongst Chaos. On 30 April 2017, they played at Outbreak Festival in Leeds. On 13 August 2017, the band played the Ronnie James Dio stage at Bloodstock Open Air. In January 2018, they took part in the 2018 Persistence Tour with Hatebreed, Terror, Madball, Power Trip and Born from Pain. In June 2019, they opened for Hatebreed on their 25th Anniversary U.K. tour.

== Musical style ==
The band has been categorised as hardcore punk, metalcore and crossover thrash James Christopher Monger of AllMusic described their music as "employing a lethal mix of politically and socially charged punk, brutal hardcore, and furious metalcore", while Thomas Strater of Metal Hammer, likened their sound to the album Master Killer by Merauder. Their music makes use of thrash metal riffing and heavy hardcore stylised breakdowns. They have cited influences including Terror, Merauder and Testament.

== Members ==
Final

- Dale Graham – vocals (2007–2020)
- Dave Egan – guitar (2007–2020)
- Matt Weston – guitar (2014–2020)
- Neil Moran – bass guitar (2014–2020)
- Adam Kelly – drums (2007–2020)

Former

- Ben Collinson – guitar (2007–2010)
- Euan Lees – guitar (2010–2014)
- Paolo Passerini – bass guitar (2007–2014)

== Discography ==
Albums

- At Peace Amongst Chaos (2016)

EPs

- Broken Teeth (2009)
- The Seeker (2011)
- Ain't No Rest for the Wicked (2012)
- Split with the Mongoloids (2014)
