= Mecca Rafeeque Ahmed =

Indian businessman

Mecca Rafeeque Ahmed is an Indian businessman and entrepreneur from Tamil Nadu. He is a recipient of the 2011 Padma Shri Award.

== Career ==
Ahmed's father, Haji Mecca Abdul Majid Sahib, started the Farida Prime Tannery in 1957. He named it after the youngest of his nine daughters and started it with Rs. 1.5 million from his savings and bank loans. Rafeeque Ahmed started his career in 1958 and took over full control of the business after his father's demise in 1965. Under his guidance, the Farida Group has grown from a tannery to many shoemaking and tannery divisions.

== Social service ==
The company Farida Group has a presence in the Vellore district and has created thousands of jobs for the locals. They process about 80,000 sq. feet of hide and manufacture about 23,000 pairs of shoes and 3,500 pairs of shoe-uppers per day. They employ nearly 9,000 people.

== Awards and honours ==
Mecca Rafeeq Ahmed is a recipient of the 2011 Padma Shri Award, India's fourth-highest civilian award. He was also awarded an honorary degree by Hindustan Institute of Technology & Science in 2017.
