= Albert Ssempeke =

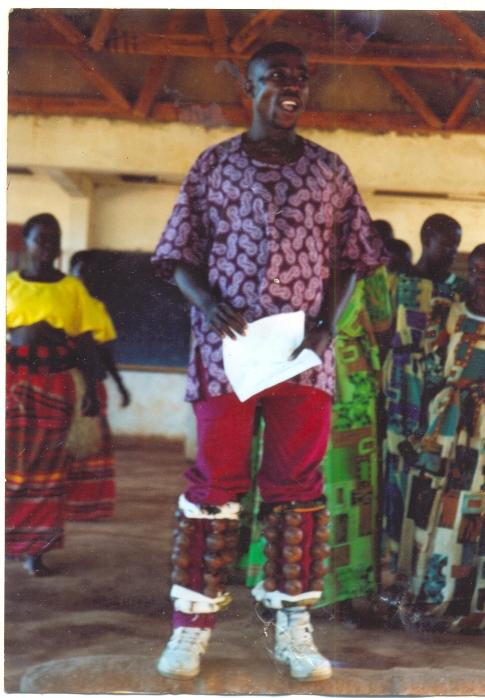

Background information
- Born: Uganda
- Genres: Baganda music, Royal Buganda music
- Occupation: Musician
- Instruments: Endere flute, Lyre, Drums, Kiganda harp

Albert Ssempeke was a musician known for Baganda Music. He was also a royal musician to the Kabaka of Buganda, Mutesa II of Buganda. Albert's album Ssempeke! is music from the pre-independence era of Buganda.

At age 11, Albert began playing the endere flute. He was tutored by the royal flautists and rose as a court musician. He also added the lyre, drums, and the eight-stringed kiganda harp to his repertoire. After the kingdom of Buganda was dissolved by Milton Obote, royal music declined because many refused to play it. The reign of Idi Amin led to its further decline when many people fled. By the 1980s, most people had either forgotten royal music or died, which left Albert as one of the last royal musicians, making him of interest to ethnomusicologists. In 1987, he was invited by Peter Cooke to be a Musician in Residence at the University of Edinburgh.

== See also ==
- Ugandan instrumentalists
- Ugandan jazz musicians
- Ugandan singers
- Ugandan world music musicians
