= Killing Me Softly (band) =

English metalcore band

- Origin: Leeds, West Yorkshire, UK
- Genres: Metalcore
- Years active: 2023–present
- Labels: The Coming Strife, Streets of Hate, Northern Unrest
- Spinoff of: Static Dress, Cutting Teeth, Galleries, Gutter

Killing Me Softly are an English metalcore band from Leeds that was formed in 2023 by former members of the band Gutter. They released their debut album Autumn Lost in Silence in 2023, which was followed by the 2025 EP To Forever Fall Through God’s Safety Net. Their fusion of early 2000s-indebted metalcore with elements of emo put them at the forefront of the international metalcore revival of the 2020s.

== History ==
Killing Me Softly was formed in 2023 in Leeds, UK. Roberts and Jones had previously played in Cutting Teeth. Kay had previously played in Static Dress and Galleries. Kirk had previously been in 99% Cobra, and had been featured on the Cutting Teeth song "Ghost Blood". They originated as a part of a wave of 2020s bands from the Dreambound melodic hardcore scene who began pursuing different styles. The band's founding lineup had all been a part of Leeds metalcore band Gutter. They changed their name to Killing Me Softly in 2023, while recording what was intended to be Gutter's debut full-length. On 4 September 2023, they released the three track promo Cries of a Dying Dawn, which was followed by their debut album Autumn Lost In Silence in December 2023. They then performed at Outbreak Festival 2024.

On 7 August 2025, they released the EP To Forever Fall Through God’s Safety Net through Northern Unrest and Streets Of Hate. Between 11 and 24 September 2025, they toured Europe supporting Poison the Well alongside Bodyweb. On 27 April 2026, they released the Spring Promo '26 promo. They will perform at Sin City Mosh Festival in Hamburg in October 2026.

== Musical style ==
Critics have categorised Killing Me Softly's music as metalcore. They incorporate elements of emo, screamo, emoviolence, jazz and powerviolence.

Killing Me Softly's songs make use of high tempos, irregular structures, irregular time signatures and dynamic structures centred around parts conducive to moshing. Oftentimes, they moments are breakdowns where guitars contrast low-pitched palm muted riffs with high-pitched dissonant chords. Their guitars are often technical and chaotic, contrasted by bittersweet clean moments. Vocalist Roberts mostly makes use of high-pitched screams, however sometimes diversifies with low death growls clean singing. His vocals use an emotional tone.

They have cited influences including Poison the Well, Converge, Cave In and This Day Forward.

Killing Me Softly are a forefront band in UK metalcore in the 2020s. They are a part of a wave of bands reviving the early 2000s metalcore style, alongside I Promised the World, and UK bands Cauldron, Dandelion and Durendal. Journalist Eli Enis called them "one of the very best (real) metalcore bands the UK has produced over the past decade" alongside xRepentancex, Renounced and Realm of Torment, while Noizze writer Will Marshall called them "One of the most exciting young bands in the British heavy music scene in general, not just metalcore" and "a sound that harks back to the likes of Skycamefalling and first album Killswitch Engage given a modern flourish of heaviness and violence".

They have been cited as an influence by Split Chain.

== Discography ==
Studio albums

- Autumn Lost in Silence (2023)

EPs

- To Forever Fall Through God’s Safety Net (2025)

Promos

- Cries of a Dying Dawn (2023)
- Spring Promo '26 (2026)
