= Pest Control (band) =

English band

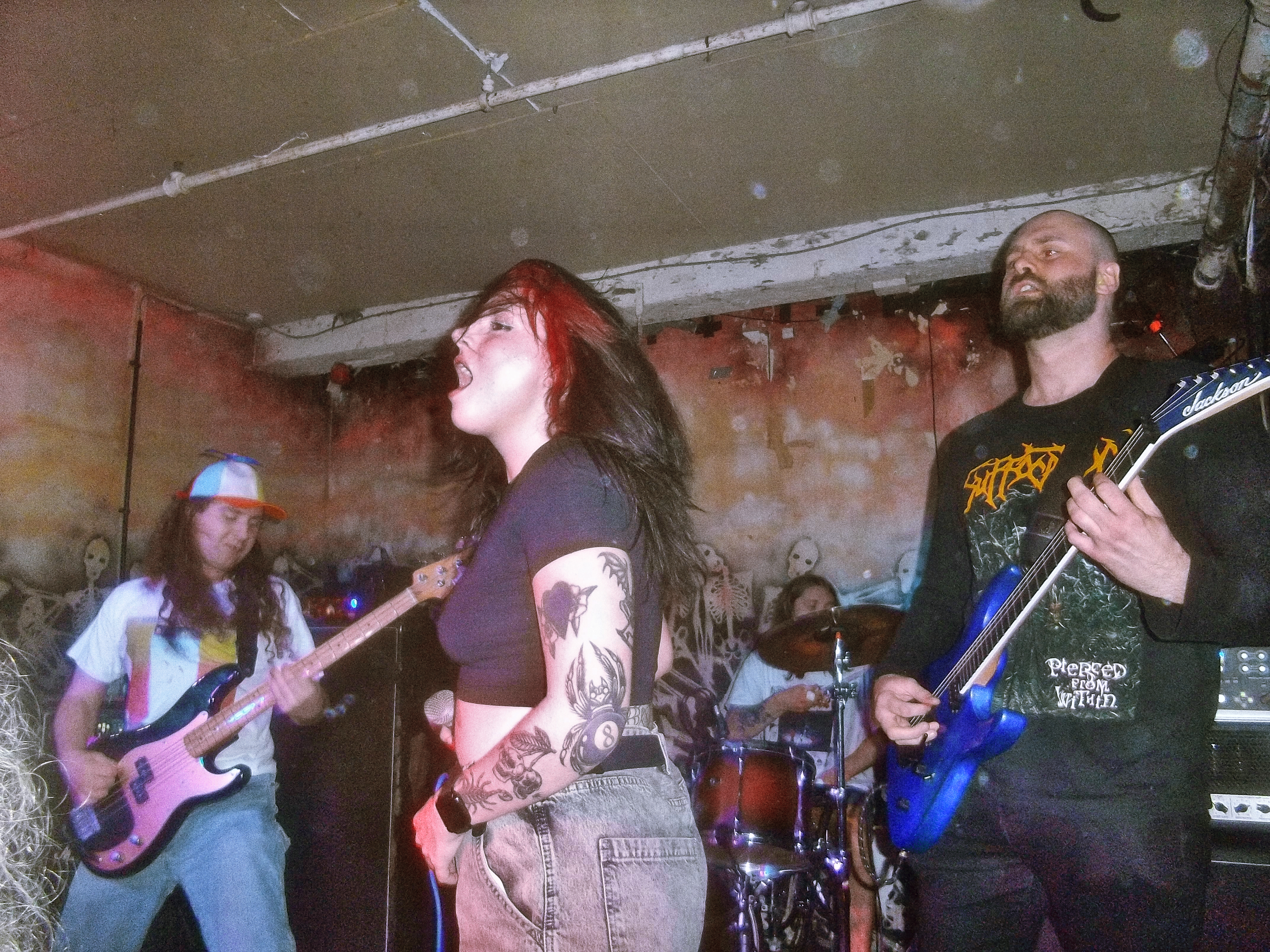
- Pest Control live in 2024

Background information
- Origin: Leeds, West Yorkshire, U.K.
- Genres: Crossover thrash, hardcore punk
- Years active: 2020–present
- Label: Quality Control HQ
- Spinoffs: Bodyweb
- Spinoff of: Implement
- Members: Leah Massey-Hay; Joseph Kerry; Ben Jones; Jack Padurariu; Joe Sam Williams

Pest Control is an English hardcore punk band from Leeds, West Yorkshire. They have released one studio album, in addition to their 2020 demo. A 2023 article by Metal Hammer writer Dom Lawson called the band "the single most exciting band in the UK right now".

== History ==
Leah Massey-Hay, Joseph Kerry and Ben Jones had previously been a part of the hardcore band Implement, which disbanded amidst the COVID-19 lockdown in the United Kingdom. Soon, Kerry began sending ideas for songs to Massey-Hay and Jones. This culminated in the first Pest Control demo, which was recorded in September 2020, by Massey-Hay on vocals, Joseph Kerry on guitar and Jones on drums. The release was followed shortly by the hiring of bassist Jack Padurariu.

The band began recording for their debut album in 2022. During this time, the band recruited second guitarist Luke Schoonbeek for recording. Once the recording process was completed, they hired Big Cheese bassist Joe Sam Williams as a permanent second guitarist. On 10 February 2023, the band officially released their debut album, titled Don't Test the Pest. During February 2023, they opened for Kreator on their United Kingdom headline tour, alongside Municipal Waste. On 11 August, they released the single "Enjoy the Show", accompanied by a music video. Between 22 August and 11 September, they toured the United Kingdom supporting Obituary. On 6 January 2024, the band played a benefit show for the Leeds venue Boom, alongside Higher Power, the Flex and Static Dress. On 18 May, the band performed at Desert Festival in London.

The band were originally scheduled to play the June 2024 Download Festival. However, on 10 June, four days before the festival, the band announced they had cancelled their appearance due to the festival's sponsorship by Barclaycard who were connected to Israel's role in the Israeli–Palestinian conflict. In the following hours, the band's statement led to Scowl, Zulu, Speed, Negative Frame, Overpower and Ithaca to cancel their appearances at the festival too. Instead, over the following days Pest Control, Scowl, Speed and Zulu organised a fundraising for the Palestinian cause, which was held at Centrala in Birmingham on 14 June. The show included support from Cauldren, Ikhras and Transistrrr. The sponsorship was dropped from the festival on the same day, with negotiations initiated by Enter Shikari.

On 12 August 2024, the band released the single "Time Bomb", announcing it would a part of their Autumn 2024 EP Year Of The Pest.

== Musical style ==
Pest Control have been categorised by critics as crossover thrash and hardcore punk, while also making use of elements of death metal. The band's music incorporates tight and grooving thrash metal guitar riffs and raspy, shouted vocals. The band often avoid the political lyrics commonplace in hardcore and crossover thrash. Instead, lyrics discuss personal themes and mental health, many of which are told through metaphors of insects and infestations.

They have cited influences including Suicidal Tendencies, Anthrax, the Crumbsuckers, Municipal Waste, Metallica, Testament and Ludichrist.

== Band members ==
- Leah Massey-Hay – vocals (2020–present)
- Joseph Kerry – guitar (2020–present)
- Ben Jones – drums (2020–present)
- Jack Padurariu – bass (2020–present)
- Joe Sam Williams – guitar (2022–present)

== Discography ==
Albums

- Don't Test the Pest (2023)

EPs

- Year Of The Pest (2024)

Demos

- Demo 2020

Singles

- "Infestation/Rat Race"
- "Enjoy the Show"
- "Time Bomb"
