= Incendiary (band) =

American metalcore band

- Origin: Long Island, New York
- Genres: Hardcore punk, metalcore, tough guy hardcore
- Years active: 2007–present
- Label: Closed Casket Activities
- Members: Brendan Garrone; Rob Nobile; Brian Audley; Dan Lomeli
- Website: facebook.com/IncendiaryHC

Incendiary is an American hardcore punk band from Long Island, New York.

== History ==
Incendiary began in 2008 with a 7-inch EP titled Amongst The Filth. They subsequently released three full-length albums: in 2009, Crusade on Eternal Hope Records, in 2013, Cost of Living, on Closed Casket Activities and, in 2017, Thousand Mile Stare, on Closed Casket Activities.

In 2017, they teamed up with CFO$ to record the theme song for NXT wrestler Aleister Black. Vocalist Brendan Garrone joined the members of Code Orange at NXT TakeOver: Brooklyn III performing Black's theme song live as he came to the ring.

Incendiary does not tour actively but have played on a number of shows and festivals. They played on France's Hellfest in 2022 alongside groups like Metallica, Bring Me the Horizon and Mercyful Fate. They opened up for Backtrack at one of their final shows in Amityville New York at the Revolution Bar & Music Hall. Every holiday season since 2013, the band does a show at the Amityville Music Hall. The band did a short run with Glassjaw in the spring of 2022, they joined up with groups like Folly and Life of Agony. The band was set to open up for E.Town Concrete at the Starland Ballroom in New Jersey on October 8, 2022.

== Band members ==
- Brendan Garrone (vocals)
- Rob Nobile (guitar)
- Brian Audley (guitar)
- Dan Lomeli (drums)

== Discography ==
=== Studio albums ===
- Crusade (2009)
- Cost of Living (2013)
- Thousand Mile Stare (2017)
- Change the Way You Think About Pain (2023)

=== Compilation albums ===
- Product of New York (2026)

=== EPs and splits ===
- Amongst the Filth 7-inch (2008)
- Incendiary/Suburban Scum (2010)
- Incendiary/Unrestrained (2011)
- Incendiary/Xibalba (2012)

=== Demos ===
- Incendiary (2007)
