= Static Dress =

English rock band

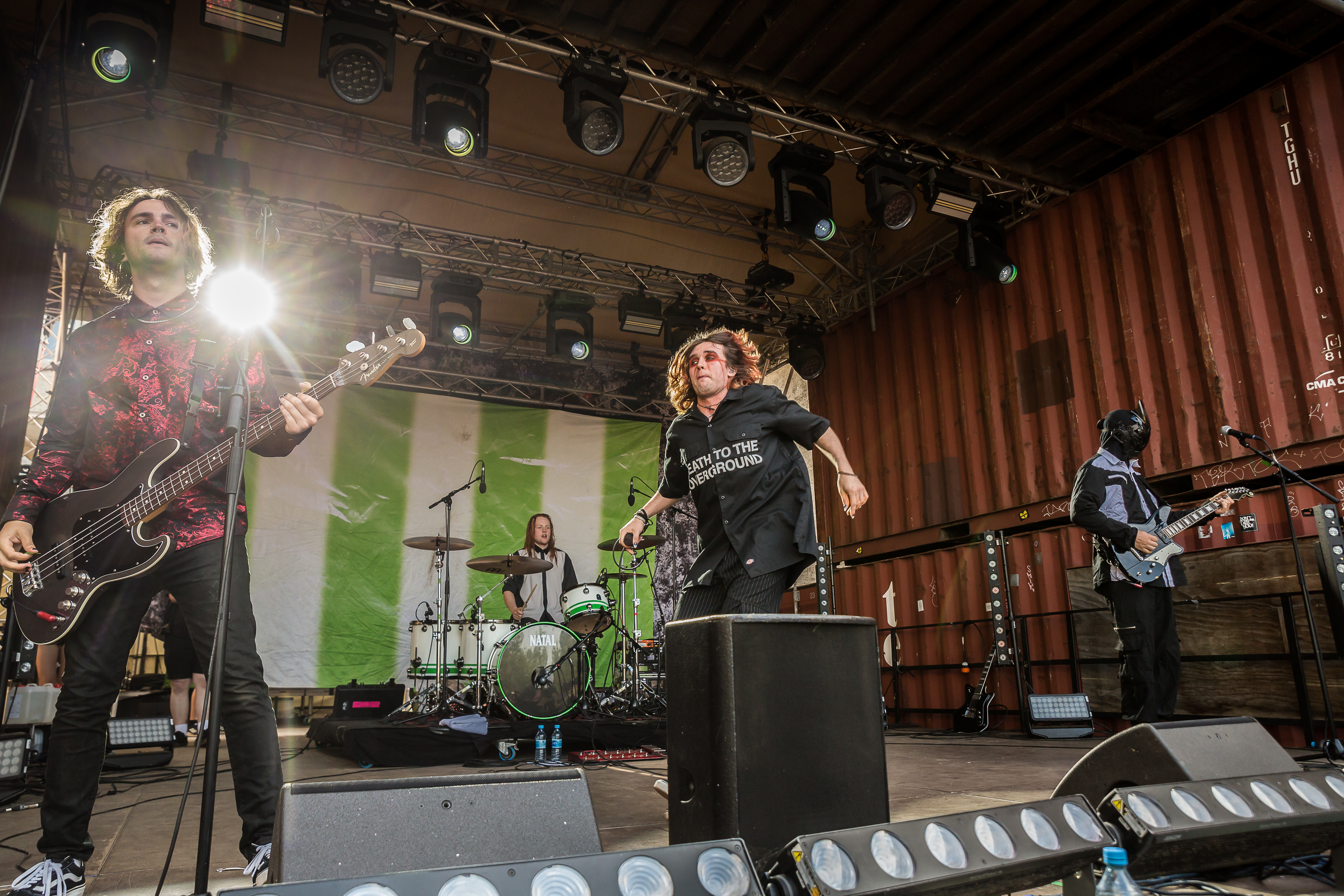
- Static Dress at the Full Force 2023

Background information
- Origin: Leeds, West Yorkshire, England
- Genres: Post-hardcore; pop screamo; metalcore; emo
- Years active: 2018–present
- Labels: Venn; Roadrunner; Sumerian
- Spinoffs: Killing Me Softly
- Spinoff of: Galleries
- Members: Olli Appleyard; Sam Ogden; George Holding; Vincent Weight
- Past members: Tom Black; Sam Kay; Connor Reilly
- Website: staticdress.com

Static Dress are an English rock band from Leeds, West Yorkshire. Formed in 2018, Static Dress are a concept band with their material following a continuous story. They currently consist of lead vocalist Olli Appleyard, drummer Sam Ogden, guitarist Vincent Weight and bassist George Holding. They have released two full-length studio albums, three EPs and various standalone singles, as well as a comic book and three video games.

The band was formed in 2018 by Appleyard, drummer Sam Kay and guitarist Tom Black, all former members of the melodic hardcore band Galleries, as well as Connor Reilly (bass). They released their debut single "Clean" on 14 August 2019, which initiated a series of five standalone singles. They released a small number of their debut demo CD TBC in September 2021, which featured many tracks included on their debut EP Prologue... (Comic Book Soundtrack), released on 3 December 2021. Their debut album Rouge Carpet Disaster was released on 18 May 2022, with two "redux" versions released the following year as Rouge Carpet Disaster (Redux) Volume 2 and Rouge Carpet Disaster (Redux) Volume 3. In 2023, they also released a small run of their How I Hurt Myself demo tapes, whose songs "Crying" and "Face" were released as singles in 2024 and 2025. Their second album Injury Episode was released in 2026.

== History ==
=== Formation, early singles and Prologue... (2018–2021) ===
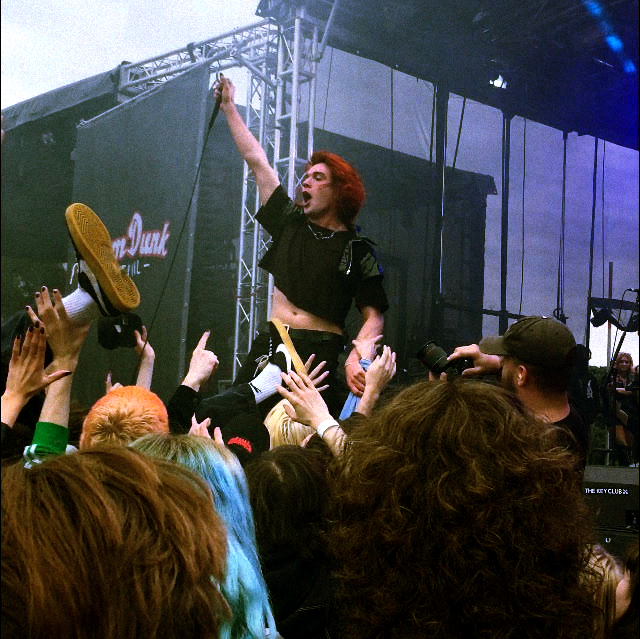
Static Dress in 2021

The band was formed in 2018 by drummer Sam Kay, guitarist Tom Black and lead vocalist Olli Appleyard, who had been working as a photographer and videographer for a number of bands. Appleyard, Black and Kay had previously been involved with the band Galleries. Reilly had recently moved from Manchester to Leeds, which led the group to begin writing music in various different styles, trying to find their sound. The earliest sound the band began creating was hardcore punk; however, no music from this period was released.

They released their debut single "Clean" on 14 August 2019. The single was accompanied by a music video directed by Appleyard and Sam Kay. They made their live debut at the Glasgow practice room on 3 October of the same year, opening for Decay. In the following days, they also performed in Leeds and Liverpool. Soon after, they were asked to open for Dream State and Creeper on their own headline tours. On 28 November 2019, they released their second single "Adaptive Taste". From 6 February to 20 February 2020, they opened for Counterparts on their UK headline tour, alongside Can't Swim and Chamber. On the final date of the tour, they livestreamed their performance, releasing it under the title "Time To Reset".

On 14 April 2020, they released the single "Safeword", which was accompanied by a music video, filmed over FaceTime due to the then-ongoing COVID-19 lockdown. On 11 July 2020, they released the single "Indecent". On 3 September 2020, they released the single "For the Attention of...". On 20 June 2021, they performed at the Download Festival pilot, and the 2021 Slam Dunk Festival in September. Between 28 October and 6 November 2021, they opened for Yours Truly on their UK headline tour alongside Wargasm.

On 4 June 2021, they release the single "Sweet." Prior to the release of "Sweet.", Black and Sam Kay departed from the group, leading to the recruitment of anonymous guitarist Contrast and drummer Sam Ogden. November 2 to 20, they toured supporting Higher Power on their UK headline tour. On 5 November 2021, they released the single "Sober Exit(s)" and announced that the single would be a part of their debut EP "Prologue...". The EP was released on 3 December 2021, coinciding with the release of a companion comic book illustrated by Tanya Kenny and written by Appleyard. In December 2020 they opened for Creeper on their UK headline tour alongside Holding Absence and Wargasm. On 6 January 2022, they released the single "Di-sinTer" featuring King Yosef.

=== Rouge Carpet Disaster (2022–2025) ===
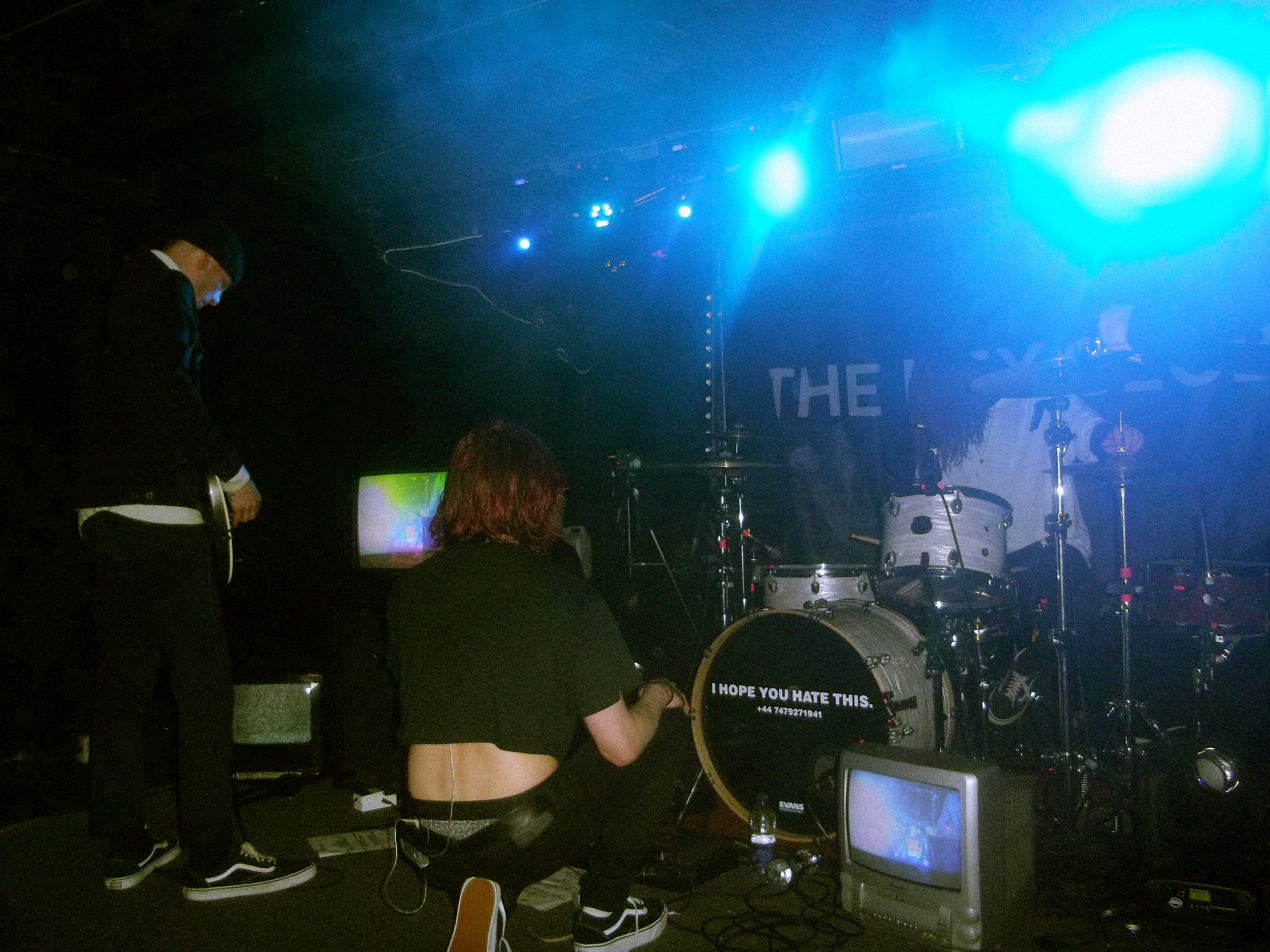
Static Dress in 2022

In February 2022, they opened for Knocked Loose and Terror on their UK co-headline tour. On 14 February, they announced that their debut album Rouge Carpet Disaster would be released on 18 May. On 23 February, they released the single "Such a Shame" and announced their debut UK headline would take place between 10 and 16 April. On 20 April, they released the single "Fleahouse". Between 10 November and 17 December, they toured the United States in support of Loathe. Bassist Connor Reilly announced his departure from the band on 30 January 2023, citing personal issues via a statement on Instagram. In February, they supported Bring Me the Horizon on their European tour.

On 18 May, they announced a deluxe version of Rouge Carpet Disaster would be released on 15 September, accompanied by the release of a reworked version "Courtney, Just Relax" featuring World Of Pleasure and that they had been signed to Roadrunner Records. On 27 and 28 May, they performed at Slam Dunk Festival. At the festival, the band sold the exclusive EP How I Hurt Myself, which included the tracks "Crying", "Face", "Still Learning" and an 8-bit rendition of "Fleahouse". On 10 June they performed at Download Festival. On 27 June, they released a reworked version of "Such.a.Shame", which was followed on 17 August by "Di-Sinter (Glitter Redux)" and "Attempt 8" featuring Sophie Meiers on 19 September.

On 20 October, the band surprise-dropped Rouge Carpet Disaster (Redux) Volume 2, a four-track EP containing additional reworked tracks from Rouge Carpet Disaster as well as one live recording: "Lye Solution" featuring Loathe, BVDLVD and Hail the Sun; "...Maybe!!?" remixed by Oblivion and featuring Bodyweb and Ryder Johnson; "Sweet" performed live at Barclays Arena; and "Cubical Dialogue" remixed by I'm Letting Unseen Forces Take the Wheel. On 3 November, they surprise-released Rouge Carpet Disaster (Redux) Volume 3, another four-track rework EP containing features from Creeper, Carl Brown, Bobby Wolfgang and Sølv. On 7 March 2024, they released Rouge Carpet Disaster: The Video Game, an 8-bit video game for Game Boy Color, based on Rouge Carpet Disaster.

On 15 May 2024, they released the single "Crying". On 21 March 2025, they released the single "Death to the Overground". On 3 April 2025, they released the single "face", which unmasked Contrast as Vincent Weight.

=== Injury Episode (2026–present) ===
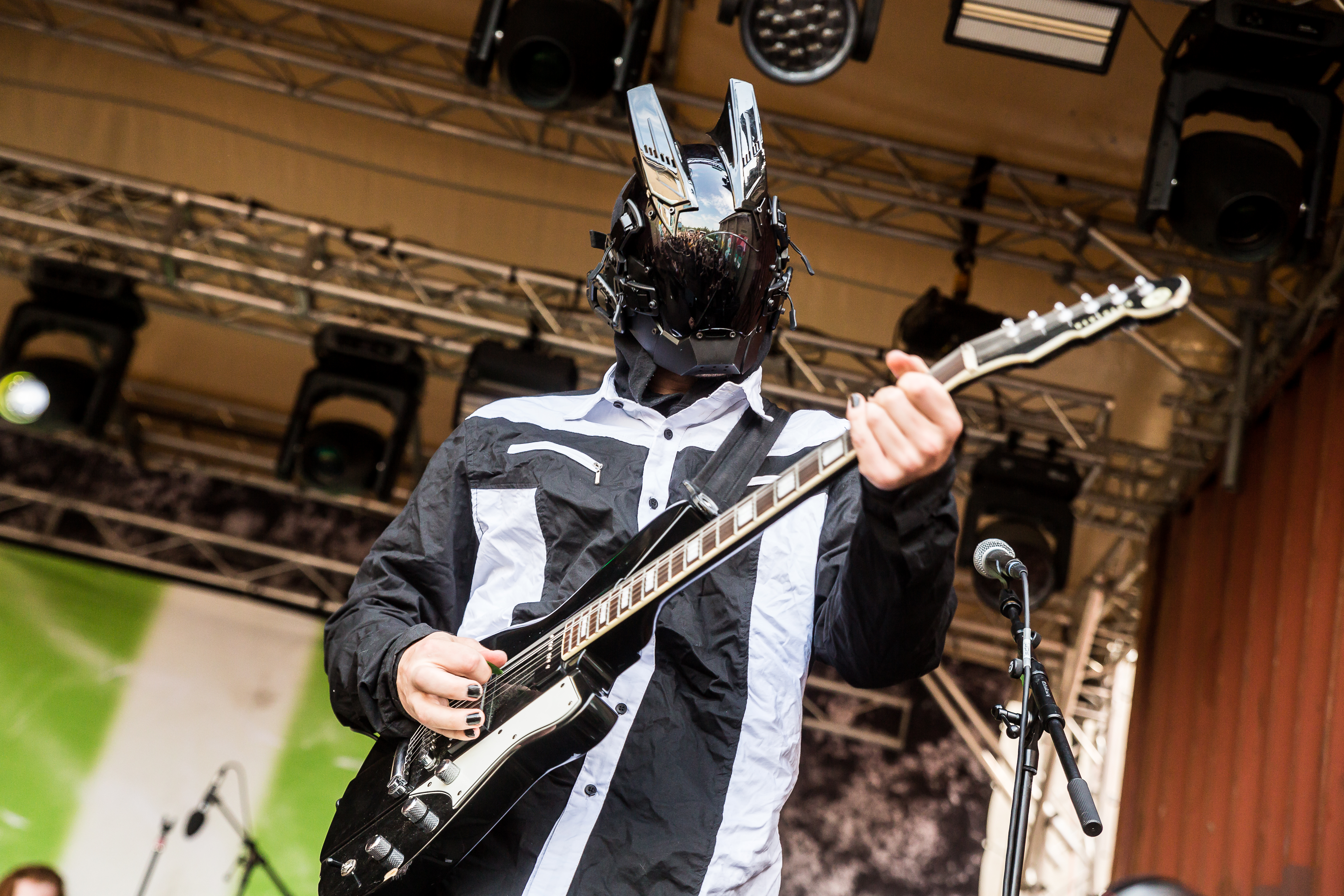
From 2021–2025, the band's guitarist was masked and anonymous, using the pseudonym Contrast

On 15 January 2026, the band announced they had signed with Sumerian Records and released the single "Human Props". In March, they released a puzzle game on their website, which featured hints to an upcoming event in London. The event was officially announced as the free live performance A Live Death Display, which took place on 31 March and was only attendable through RSVP. Three more A Live Death Display events took place over the subsequent days, in Leeds, New York City and Los Angeles. At all events, phones were banned. On 1 April, they released the single "Nostalgia Kills", featuring Underoath, and announced their second full-length, Injury Episode, was set to be released on 29 May 2026. The announcement coincided with the release of the Game Boy Advance video game The Place of No Ends, based upon the events of Injury Episode. The game was developed by coder Alex Constante from a modified version of Doom (1993). On 28 April, they released the single "Hospice". Between 9 and 16 May, they toured Australia, alongside Loathe. Upon returning from the tour, the band cancelled their upcoming dates supporting Knocked Loose in mainland Europe due to "a family emergency". On 21 May, they released the video game The Magistrate's Loop, a psychological horror. It was intended as a prologue to the story of the album. To coincide with Injury Episode's 29 May release, the band released a music video for its track "Dull Blade Disguise".

Between 3 and 5 June, they headlined a tour of the UK as a part of their Panic Room V4 live performances. On 27 June, they performed a secret set on the main stage at Outbreak Festival. They performed at Bring Me the Horizon's 10 July release show for the rerecording of Count Your Blessings, alongside Car Underwater, Rolo Tomassi, Dying Wish, Heriot and Still in Love. Between 20 October and 1 November, they will headline a tour of Europe with support from Soul Blind, Love Rarely and Holder.

== Artistry ==
=== Musical style ===
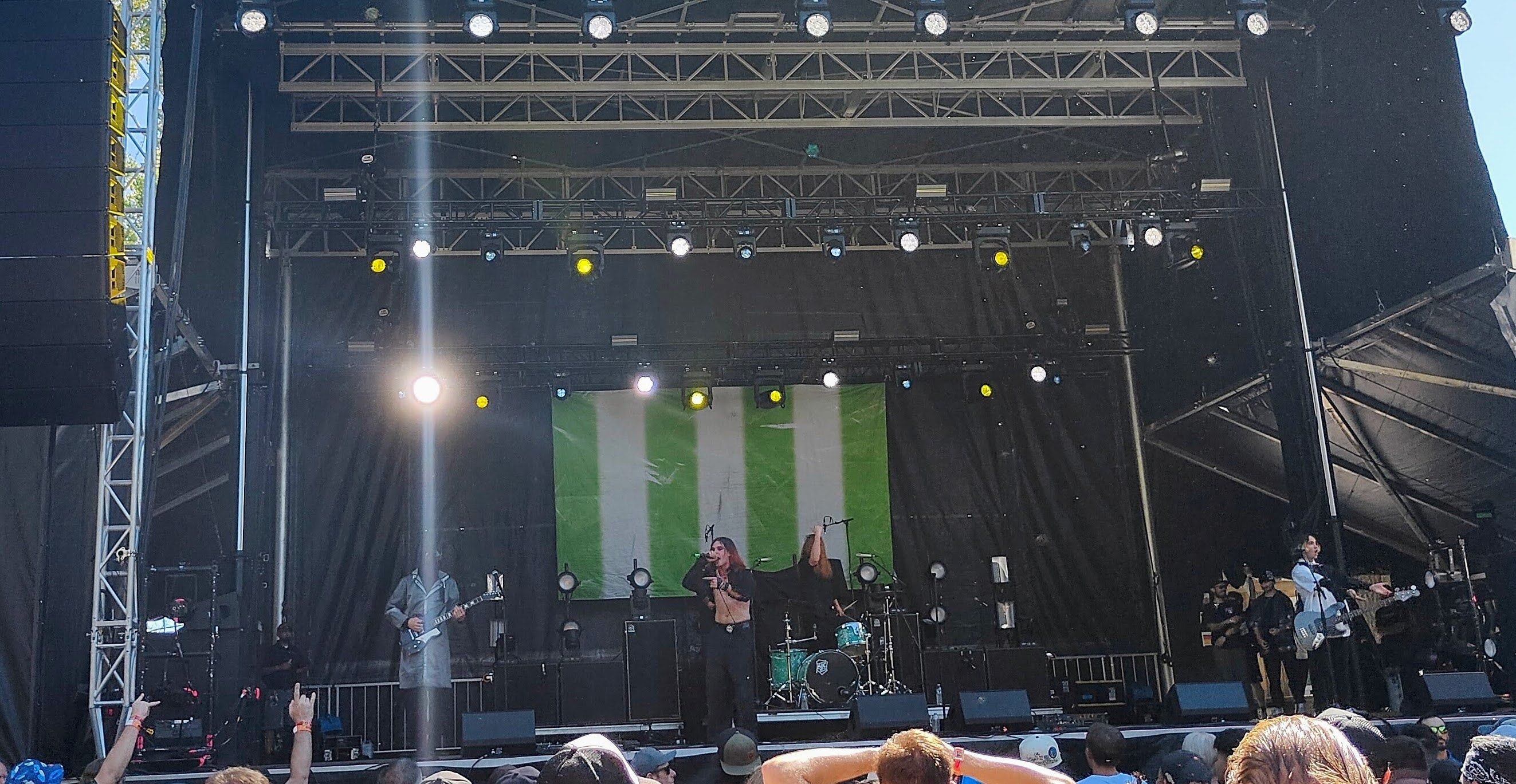
Static Dress playing at Aftershock Festival 2023.

The band's music has been categorised as post-hardcore, metalcore, pop screamo, screamo and emo. They often make use of elements of alternative rock, electronic music, jazz, gospel, americana, punk rock and nu metal, and produce ambient tracks as a means of world-building. PopMatters cited them as a frontrunner of the "scene metalcore revival", while Revolver cited them as a part of the "post-hardcore revival" and BrooklynVegan cited them as a frontrunner of the pop screamo revival. Dork called their music "a revamped take on '90s hardcore and '00s emo". In a 2021 interview with The Line of Best Fit, when asked about the band's categorisations and comparisons, Appleyard stated, "I look at these scene bands we're compared to and I’m like... If you like that, you’ll like this – but I wouldn’t say it’s derived from it".

Revolver magazine writer Eli Enis stated that they use a "push-pull between strained screams and eye-lined pop-punk hooks, Static Dress tickle the Y2K nostalgia senses without falling victim to pure homage". Rock Sound writer Jack Roger stated that they make use of "gorgeous choruses, corrosive riffs and a truly infectious atmosphere". DeadPress writer Michael Heath described their sound as "2000s tinged yet experimental brand of post-hardcore". Upset magazine said they have "a frenetic sound that is rooted in late 00s post-hardcore and emo akin to Underoath, Emery and My Chemical Romance... with its cinematic and cryptographic undertones, it becomes apparent that there is a mastermind creating a narrative within both the music and their visual counterparts" Underground Under Dogs writer Mike Giegerich stated that "Olli Appleyard is meticulous in crafting his band’s expansive palette, intentionally avoiding contemporary influences for distinctly original worldbuilding. His approach shines through as Static Dress define their own point of view within the broader context of alternative sounds, existing in a space where free-time ambient and poetic post-hardcore are able to thrive simultaneously".

The band have cited musical influences including My Chemical Romance, Senses Fail, Underoath, Counterparts, Connor Denis of Beartooth and Being as an Ocean, Portishead, At the Drive-In, Far Apart, the Arctic Monkeys, Deftones, Converge, Fleshwater, Ethel Cain, Youth Code, King Yosef, Bodyweb, Sølv, 100 gecs, Modern Color, Twink Obliterator, Dorian Electra, the 1980s funk and soul group Twilight, Tennis, Wingtips, A Knife in the Dark, Haarper, John Carpenter, Augustus Muller, Boy Harsher, Puma Blue, Myles Cameron and Nafets.

They have been cited as an influence by Pupil Slicer, Graphic Nature, Delaire the Liar and Artio. In a 2026 interview with Kerrang!, Loathe vocalist Kadeem France said Loathe and Static Dress mutually "inspire each other".

=== Imagery and worldbuilding ===
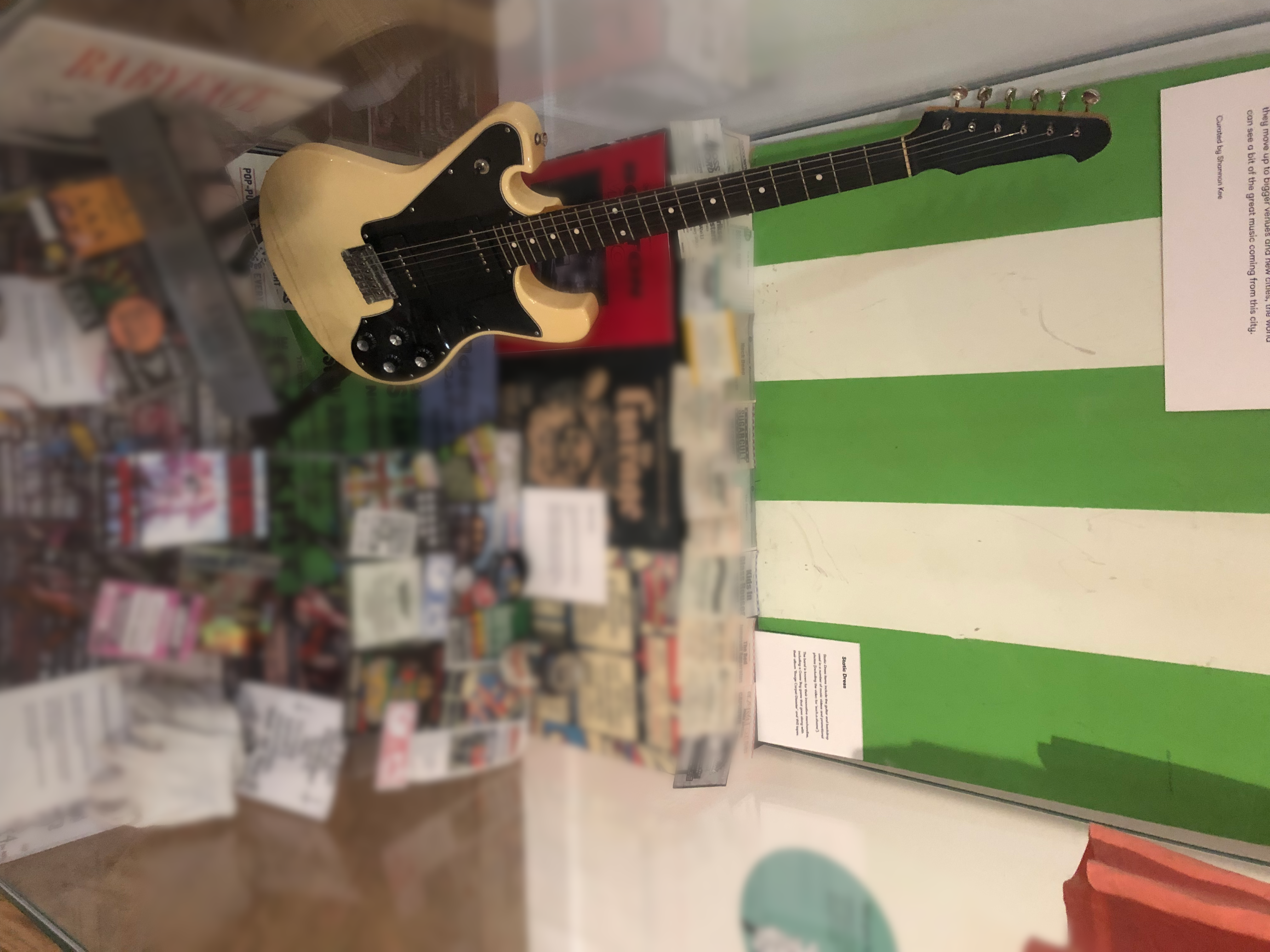
A segment of the green and white wall used in many of Static Dress' early music videos (background) and Weight's Farida CT-32 guitar (foreground), displayed at Leeds City Museum in 2025

Early in their career, Static Dress made heavy use of cathode ray tube television sets and handycams, which they distanced themselves from on Injury Episode. The band hide Easter eggs in their releases, which lead to additional lore or exclusive content. The band's livestreamed performances in 2020 and 2021 included QR codes which linked to a Dropbox containing a cover of "One of Us Is the Killer" by the Dillinger Escape Plan and a clip of Marilyn Monroe discussing happiness. Some copies of Rouge Carpet Disaster: The Game featured braille translating to "open cart". Inside the game's cartridge was a QR code which linked to exclusive content.

Appleyard has cited influences on the band's imagery as including Floria Sigismondi, Tim Burton, James Wan and The Cell, as well as the aesthetics of hyperpop and hip hop music.

==== Lore ====
Static Dress' material follows a continuous story which Kerrang! writer Mischa Pearlman described as "a vivid alternate universe centred around a semi-fictionalised version of [Appleyard]". Both the band's lyrics and imagery follow overarching storylines, which Appleyard has stated he "never want[s] to allow to cross paths". The majority of their earliest songs were accompanied by music videos that make use of reoccurring imagery. Several of the music videos all take place in the same room with striped green and white wallpaper and a red rotary phone.

The music videos from Prologue... are part of a "spin-off" of the original storyline, where the characters are looking at themselves and reflecting on "what could have been". The EP released alongside a comic book illustrated by Tanya Kenny and written by Appleyard. The comic book and song storylines take place directly before the events of Rouge Carpet Disaster. Its cassette included a second side containing an audio commentary of the tracks on the soundtrack. An earlier version of the EP was also distributed at Slam Dunk Festival 2021 which included multiple "mysteries for people to solve". This version was never intended for mainstream release.

The storyline of the comic and EP followed the characters Emile and Nancy in a non-linear narrative. It begins with the two experiencing a car crash, then outlining the couple's history and relationship dynamic, particularly the emotional dependency of Nancy upon Emile. There are hints she is an unreliable narrator. Nancy calls for help from a payphone. In a nearby diner, Emile encourages the reluctant Nancy to seduce another patron, allowing Emile to assault the man and commit motor vehicle theft of his car. Nancy begins to contemplate ending the relationship as Emile commits arson on the diner. The pair drive to Hotel Disdain.

Rouge Carpet Disaster continues the story. Only Emile reaches the hotel, arriving with a large bag, as he grapples with regret over something unexplained. As the album progresses, it is implied that, immediately following the events of Prologue, Nancy attempted to break up with Emile, and he retaliated by murdering her. Emile hallucinates the ghost of Nancy, having discussions with her, but she hardly replies. Emile takes drugs to cope with his regret and soon unsuccessfully attempts suicide. Emile, believing the hotel's caretaker deduced that he murdered Nancy, murders the caretaker with a hammer. In the hotel's garden, Emile buries both bodies. He drinks in the hotel's bar and contemplates suicide again. His inner monologue implies that the car crash which began the story was purposeful thrill-seeking and similar events had taken place prior to it. He walks through the hotel, drunk and on drugs, hallucinating a room filled with twelve faceless people dancing and then him cuddling with Nancy on the ground. He hangs himself out of a window on the twenty-third, intending to jump, but backs down.

In the deluxe editions of Rouge Carpet Disaster, the story is retold from different perspectives. Some music videos portrayed clones of Emile. In Rouge Carpet Disaster: The Game it is revealed that Hotel Disdain is a laboratory, not a hotel. It is implied Emile was birthed in a cryogenic chamber as a part of an experiment and that the events of Prologue... did not take place, instead having been artificially implanted into his memory. For his misdoings, Emile is imprisoned in the laboratory. On the EP How I Hurt Myself it is revealed that Nancy survived Emile's attack; during their relationship he had been abusive, and she had attempted suicide before the story's events. At Slam Dunk 2023, former bassist Connor Reilly appeared dressed as Emile, hung on a crucifix, an event also seen in Rouge Carpet Disaster: The Game.

In 2025, the band began uploading cryptic videos to the YouTube channel bLack-Orchid, featuring binary code and ambiguous sentences regarding characters named Maeve and Sarah. Before the band's performance at Burn It Down Festival 2025, a video was played featuring the characters calling for help and referencing Emile. Maeve and Sarah were the protagonists of Injury Episode. On the album, they are revealed to be celebrity twins who escaped from Hotel Disdain, who are under attack by paparazzi.

== Members ==
Current members

- Olli Appleyard – lead vocals (2018–present)
- Sam Ogden – drums, backing vocals (2021–present)
- Vincent Weight – guitars, backing vocals (2021–present) (Note: Upon joining the band in 2021, Weight performed masked and anynonymously, using the pseudonym Contrast. His identity was announced by the band on 3 April 2025)
- George Holding – bass, backing vocals (2022–present)
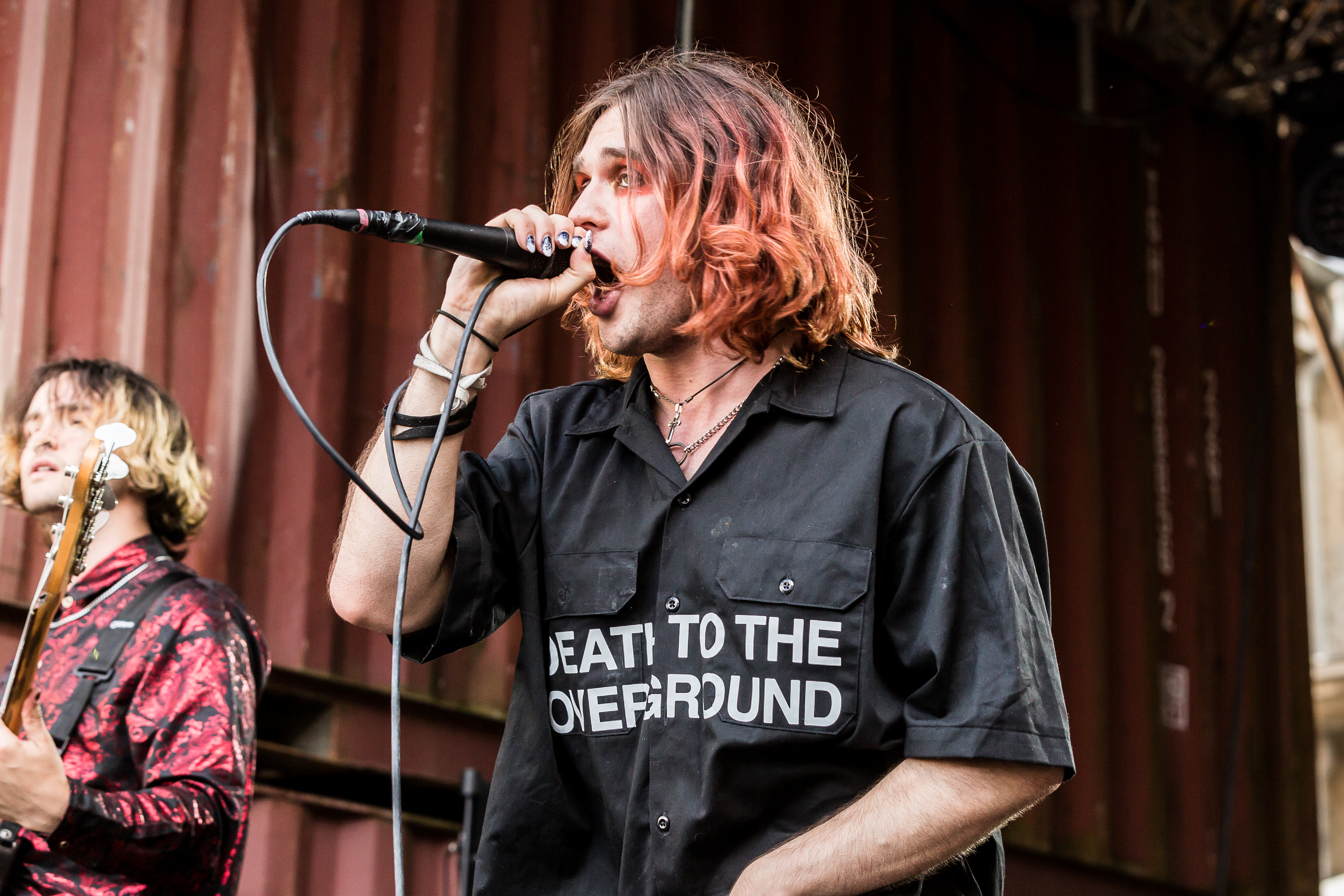
Olli Appleyard

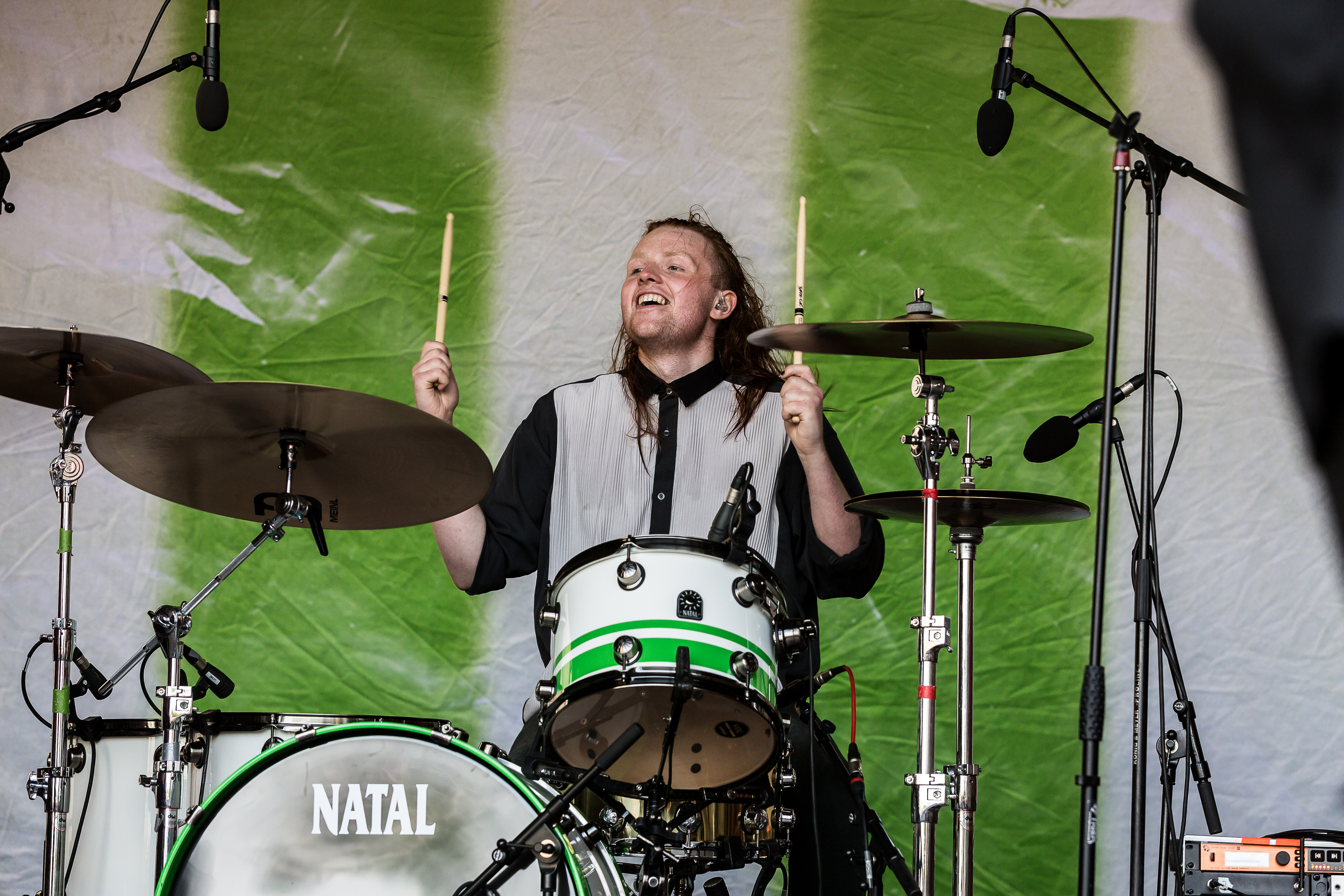
Sam Ogden

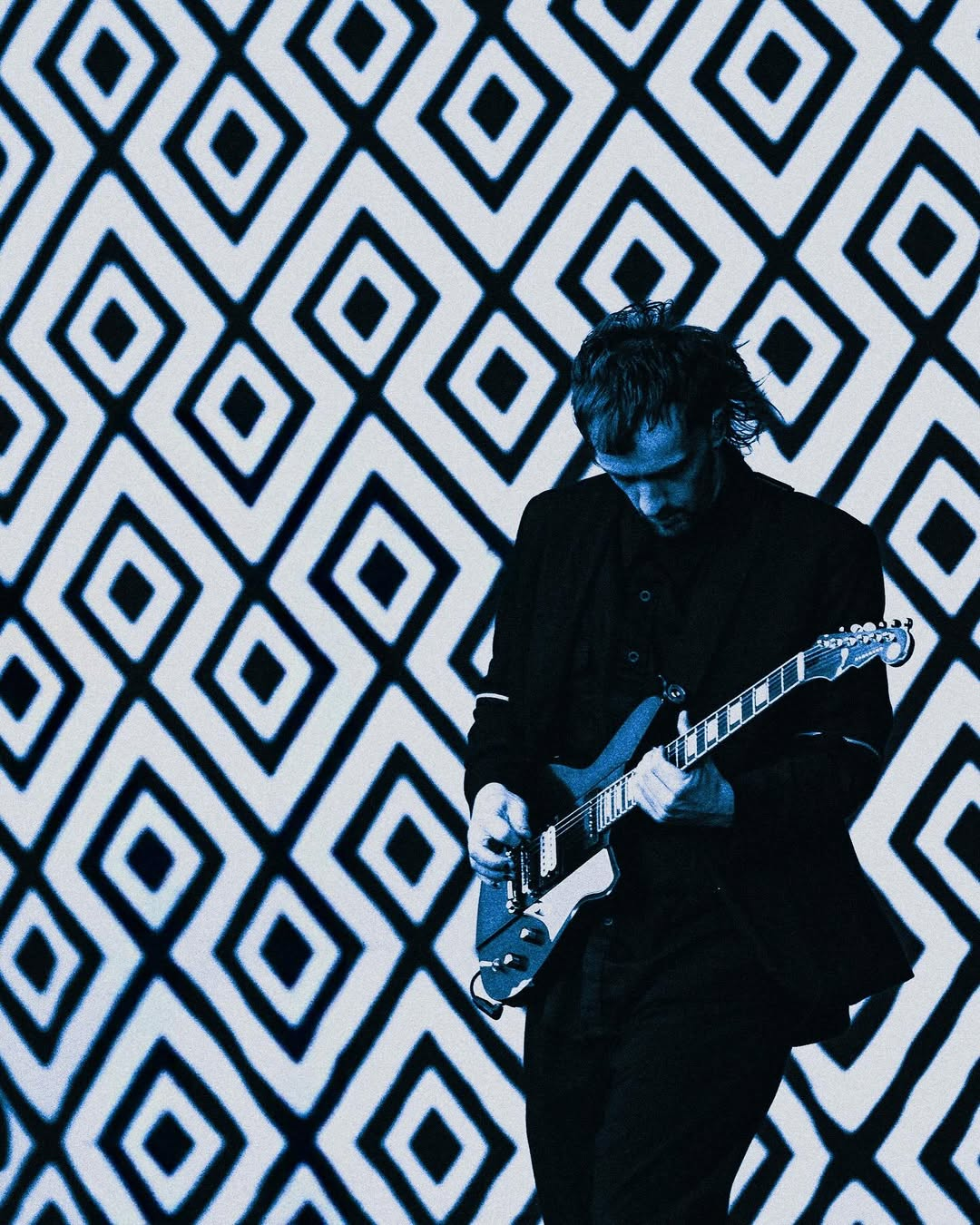
Vincent Weight

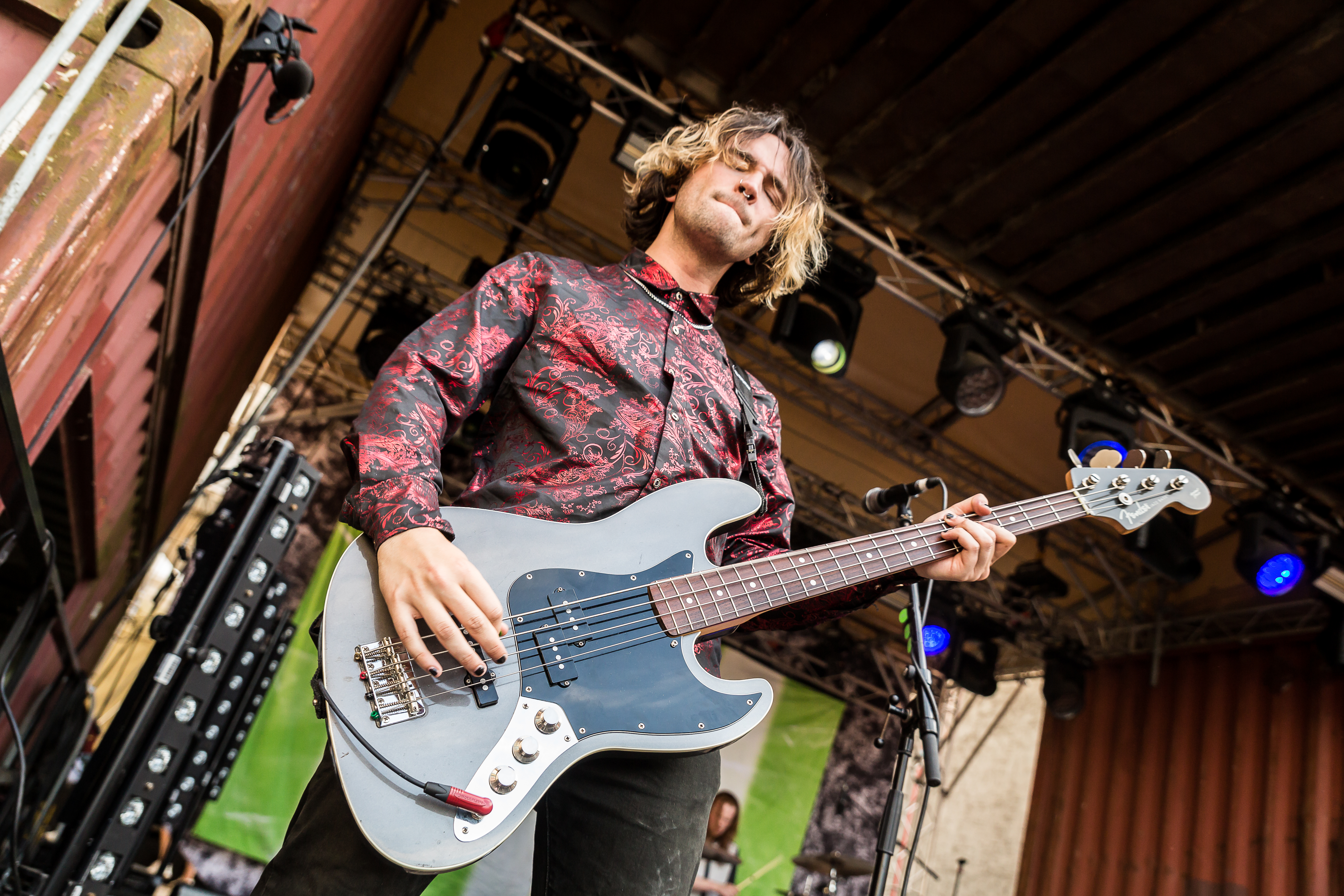
George Holding

Former members

- Tom Black – guitars (2018–2021)
- Sam Kay – drums (2018–2021)
- Connor Reilly – bass, backing vocals (2018–2022)

== Discography ==
Albums

- Rouge Carpet Disaster (2022)
- Injury Episode (2026)

EPs

- Prologue... (Comic Book Soundtrack) (2021)
- Rouge Carpet Disaster (Redux) Volume 2 (2023)
- Rouge Carpet Disaster (Redux) Volume 3 (2023)

Demos

- TBC (2021)
- How I Hurt Myself (2023)

Video albums

- Season One (2020)
- Intermission II (2020)
- Sweet. (2021)
- Rouge Carpet Disaster: Official VHS (2023)
- Live at O2 Islington (2024)

Compilations

- 2019 - 2024 (2024)

Singles

Title	Year	Album
"Clean"	2019	Non-album singles
"DSC 301"	2019	Non-album singles
"Adaptive Taste"	2019	Non-album singles
"Safeword"	2020	Non-album singles
"For the Attention Of"	2020	Non-album singles
"Indecent"	2020	Non-album singles
"Sweet"	2021	Rouge Carpet Disaster
"Sober Exits"	2021	Prologue...
"Di-Sinter" (feat. King Yosef)	2022	Rouge Carpet Disaster
"Such.a.Shame"	2022	Rouge Carpet Disaster
"Fleahouse"	2022	Rouge Carpet Disaster
"Courtney, Just relax" (feat. World of Pleasure)	2023	Rouge Carpet Disaster (Redux)
"Marisol" / "Cubicle Dialogue"	2023	Rouge Carpet Disaster
"Such.a.Shame" (Smoking Lounge Redux)	2023	Rouge Carpet Disaster (Redux)
"Di-Sinter" (Glitter Redux)	2023	Rouge Carpet Disaster (Redux)
"Crying"	2024	How I Hurt Myself
"Death to the Overground."	2025	Non-album single
"Face"	2025	How I Hurt Myself
"Human Props"	2026	Injury Episode
"Nostalgia Kills" (featuring Underoath)	2026	Injury Episode
"Hospice"	2026	Injury Episode

Music videos

Title	Year	Director
"Clean."	2019	Sam Kay & Olli Appleyard
"DSC_301"	2019	
"Adaptive Taste"	2019	Zak Pinchin, Olli Appleyard & Sam Kay
"Safeword"	2020	Static Dress
"For the Attention of..."	2020	Static Dress
"Indecent_"	2020	Static Dress
"Sweet."	2021	Static Dress
"Sober Exit(s)"	2021	Static Dress
"Vague."	2021	Static Dress
"Di-Sinter" (feat. King Yosef)	2022	Static Dress
"Such.a.Shame"	2022	Static Dress
"Fleahouse"	2022	Static Dress
"Unexplainabletitlesleavingyouwonderingwhy (Welcome In)"	2022	Static Dress
"Courtney, Just relax" (feat. World of Pleasure)	2023	Static Dress
"Such.a.Shame" (Smoking Lounge Redux)	2023	Static Dress
"Di-Sinter" (Glitter Redux)	2023	Static Dress
"Attempt 8" (feat. Sophie Meiers)	2023	Static Dress
"Lye solution" (feat. Loathe, BVDLVD, Hail The Sun)	2023	Static Dress
"Push Rope redux" (feat. Carl Bown)	2023	Static Dress
"Crying"	2024	Static Dress
"Death to the Overground."	2025	Static Dress
"face."	2025	Static Dress
"Human Props"	2026	Olli Appleyard & Zak Pinchin
"Nostalgia Kills" (feat. Underoath)	2026	Olli Appleyard & Zak Pinchin
"Hospice"	2026	Olli Appleyard
"Dull Blade Disguise"	2026	Olli Appleyard

As a featured artist

- Loathe – "Block of Flats" (2026)

== Non-music releases ==
- Prologue... (2021) – comic book
- Rouge Carpet Disaster: the Video Game (2024) – Game Boy Color video game
- The Place of No Ends (2026) – Game Boy Color video game
- The Magistrate's Loop (2026) – desktop and mobile game

== Accolades ==
Nominated work	Year	Award	Result
Static Dress	2021	Heavy Music Awards - Best UK Breakthrough Band	Nominated
Static Dress	2021	Kerrang Readers' Poll - New Band Of The Year	Won
Static Dress	2022	Heavy Music Awards - Best UK Breakthrough Artist	Nominated
Static Dress	2023	Heavy Music Awards - Best Breakthrough Live Artist	Won
