= Twin Tribes =

American rock band

- From left to right: Luis Navarro, Joel Niño, Jr.

Background information
- Origin: Brownsville, Texas, U.S.
- Genres: Cold wave; gothic rock; dark wave; post-punk
- Years active: 2017–present
- Labels: Manic Depression; Young And Cold; Beso De Muerte
- Members: Luis Navarro; Joel Niño, Jr.
- Website: www.twin-tribes.com

Twin Tribes is an American rock band formed in 2017 in Brownsville, Texas. After years touring and three albums, the band has become one of the referents of new gothic rock and dark wave styles.

The group consists of the duo Luis Navarro (guitars, lead vocals, synth, drum machines) and Joel Niño, Jr. (bass, synth, backing vocals). Navarro was born in Matamoros (Tamaulipas, Mexico). Niño is from Los Fresnos (Texas). Both artists met in Brownsville.

== Musical style ==
The band gathers their influences from the music of the 1980s, specifically the gothic rock and post-punk genres with elements of synth pop and new wave. Mentions include The Cure and Depeche Mode. They also mention influences from Rock en español, especially Latin American bands like Caifanes, Soda Stereo, and Size. Since the beginning, the band has combined the use of synthesizers like the Roland JX-3P and the Korg Poly-800, electric guitar, bass guitar, and their own vocals.

== Discography ==
Twin Tribes has published three studio albums and one remix album: Shadows (2018), Ceremony (2019), Altars (2021, remix album), and Pendulum (2024). In 2023, they released two singles (Monolith, Cauldron of Thorns) in anticipation of the album Pendulum, published in 2024. This album was very well received by the specialized press, as well as the artistic video produced for the song Monolith, directed by Sultan Mars and starring dancer Nastia Gale Yavorski. The announcement of Pendulum was accompanied with the dates for a tour with dozens of concerts in North America, Latin America, and Europe.

Their single "Fantasmas" received over a million views on YouTube right after its release and before the band was able to publish the official video.

=== Studio albums ===
- 2018 – Shadows
- 2019 – Ceremony
- 2024 – Pendulum

=== Remix albums ===
- 2021 – Altars
