= Josephs Well =

Music venue in Leeds, England

Coordinates: 53.801029°N 1.555392°W

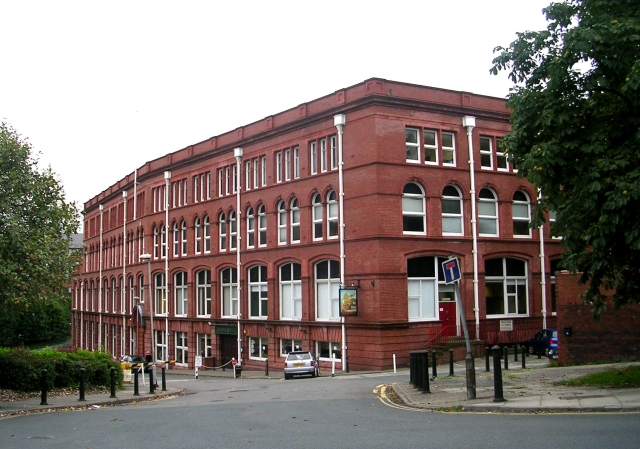
Joseph's Well building in 2008.

The Well (formerly known as Joseph's Well) was a well-known music venue in Leeds, West Yorkshire, England. Bands such as The Idlers, Caliban, The Chariot, The Killers, Editors, We Are Scientists, Bloc Party, Shame About Hayley, Kaiser Chiefs, Keane, Isis, …And You Will Know Us by the Trail of Dead, The Distillers, Dugong, Against Me!, Strike Anywhere, Fun and Chimaira played there over the years.

== Location ==
The Well is behind the Leeds General Infirmary in Leeds City Centre on Chorley Lane.

== Closure ==
The Well had announced its closing several times, and held its final show on 23 December 2012, featuring local folk punk artist Jimmy Holland.
