= Farida Group =

Indian leather manufacturing company

- Company type: Private company
- Founded: 1957
- Founder: Abdul Majid Sahib
- Headquarters: Chennai, Tamil Nadu, India
- Key people: Rafeeque Ahmed (CEO)
- Products: Leather Products
- Revenue: ▲₹17,456.4 million (US$180 million) (2017)
- Operating income: ▲₹8,985.62 million (US$94 million) (2017)
- Net income: ▲₹16,789.91 million (US$180 million) (2017)
- Website: www.farida.co.in

Farida Group is one of the largest leather manufacturing companies in India based in Chennai. The Group has 13 factories spread across Asia, Africa and Europe It was founded by Abdul Majid Sahib in 1957 in Ambur.

== Growth ==
The company has been rapidly expanding its presence all over North America and Europe by acquiring leather factories in US, UK, Germany and has recently entered the markets of Japan, China and South Korea. Future expansion plans in the Middle East, South America and China have pushed the company towards capitalizing on these regions.
