= Love Rarely =

British math rock band

- Genres: Math rock; mathcore; post-hardcore; emo
- Years active: 2022–present
- Label: Big Scary Monsters
- Members: Courtney Jade; Lew Taylor; Dan Dewsnap; Leo Godfrey; Dan Gilson
- Website: www.loverarely.com

Love Rarely are a British math rock band from Leeds.

== History ==
The band was formed in Leeds in around 2022 after guitarists Daniel Dewsnap and Lewis Taylor discussed forming a band for a number of years. Members had previously played in various bands and had solo projects in and around Leeds.

They have cited influences including the Callous Daoboys, La Dispute, Defeater, Counterparts, At the Drive-In, Hail the Sun and 156 Silence.

== Members ==
- Courtney Jade "CJ" Levitt - vocals
- Lewis "Lew" Taylor - guitar, vocals
- Daniel Dewsnap - guitar
- Leo Godfrey - drums
- Daniel Gilson - bass

== Discography ==
- Lonely People (EP) (2024)
- Pain Travels (2026)
