= Fury (American band) =

American hardcore punk band

- Origin: Orange County, California, United States
- Genres: Hardcore punk; punk rock
- Years active: 2014–present
- Label: Run for Cover
- Members: Alfredo Gutierrez; Alex Samayoa; Danny Samayoa; Jeremy Stith; Madison Woodward
- Past members: Jerrod Stith

Fury is an American hardcore punk band from Southern California.

== History ==
Fury first released their six-song demo through Mosher's Delight Records in March 2014. This was quickly followed up by the release of their debut EP, Kingdom Come, later in 2014 on Triple-B Records.

As 2015 closes, Fury released a promo for their upcoming 2016 full-length. In 2016, Fury released their debut full-length record titled Paramount on Triple-B Records. With the positive feedback from the band's previous releases which combines elements of youth crew and other several hardcore subgenres, Fury released a promo for their 2019 LP.

On May 3, 2019, Fury, signed to Run for Cover Records, released their second full-length album titled Failed Entertainment.

== Members ==
=== Current ===
- Alfredo Gutierrez - rhythm guitar (2014–present)
- Alex Samayoa - drums (2014–present)
- Danny Samayoa - bass (2015–present)
- Jeremy Stith - vocals (2014–present)
- Madison Woodward - lead guitar (2014–present)

=== Past ===
- Jerrod Stith - bass (2014–2015)
