= Farida Guitars =

Chinese guitar manufacturer

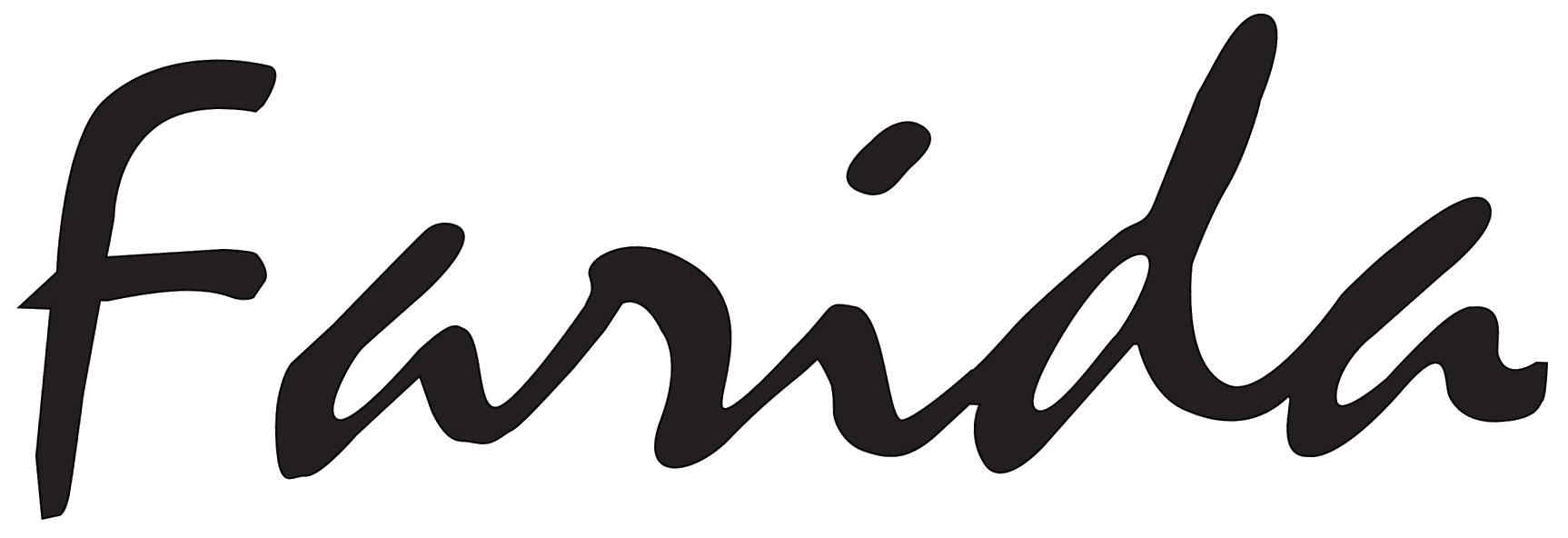
- Trade name: Farida Guitars
- Company type: Brand
- Industry: Musical Instruments
- Founded: 2004; 22 years ago
- Founder: Grand Reward Education and Entertainment (GREE)
- Headquarters: Guangdong, China
- Area served: United States, Japan, United Kingdom
- Key people: C W Tsai (CEO)
- Products: Electric, acoustic and classical guitars, basses
- Parent: Grand Reward Education and Entertainment (GREE)
- Website: faridaguitars.co.uk

Farida Guitars is a Chinese musical instruments brand. Farida, launched in 2004, seems to be a copy of Marina guitars and is part of the Grand Reward Education & Entertainment (GREE) portfolio of brands. GREE was founded in 1995, and is based in Guangdong Province. It produces OEM instruments for a selection of other brands in its 120,000 sq. ft. factory. On average, it produces around 13,000 guitars per month.

Farida endorses a number of popular contemporary musicians. These include Frank Turner, The Vaccines, Bombay Bicycle Club, and Sandi Thom.

Farida Guitars are distributed around the world under license. In the US, distribution is handled by famed vintage stringed instrument retailer Elderly Instruments, Inc. Instruments manufactured include electric, acoustic and classical guitars and basses.
