= Backtrack (band) =

American hardcore punk band

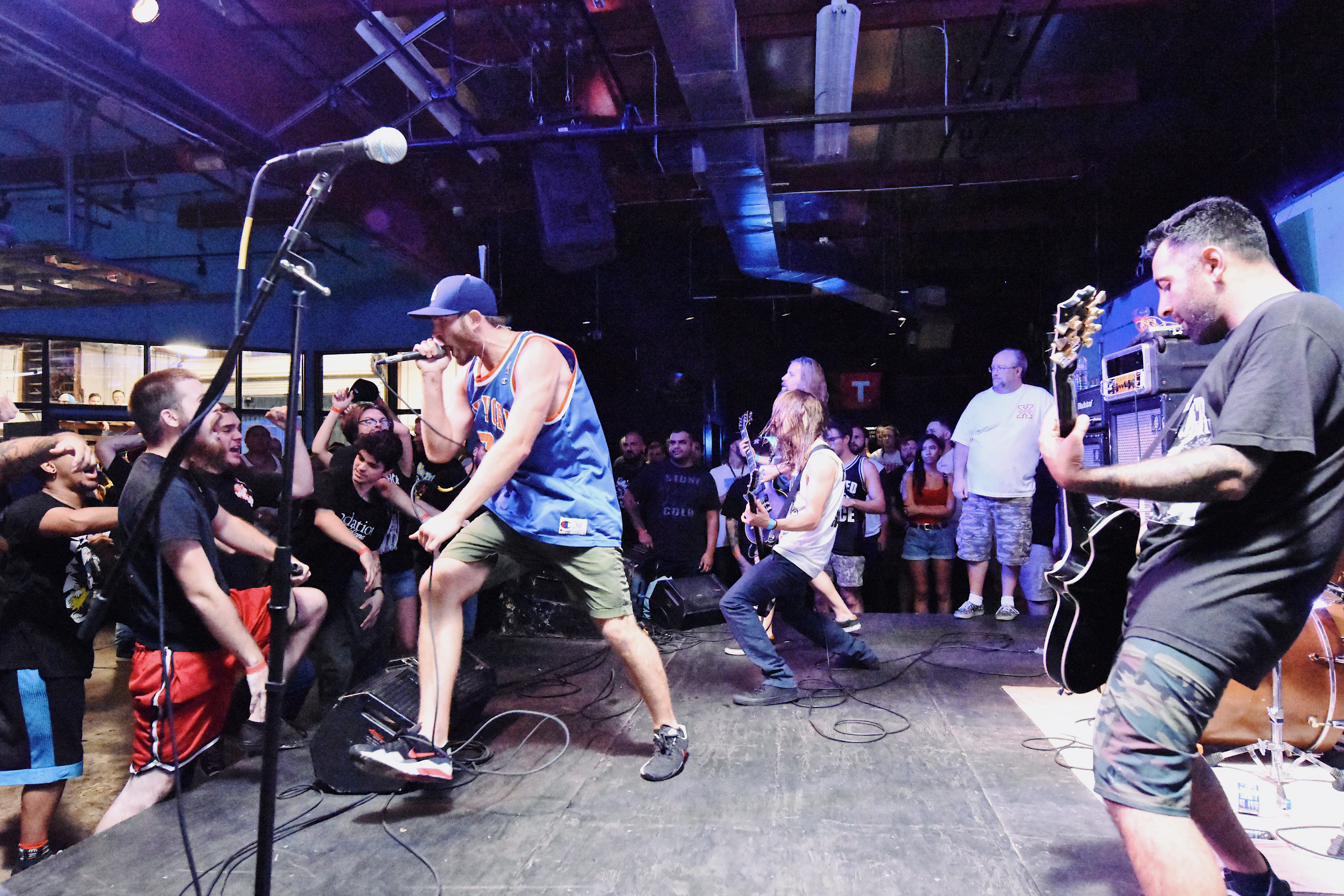
- Backtrack in 2017

Background information
- Origin: Long Island, New York, U.S.
- Genres: Hardcore punk; tough guy hardcore
- Years active: 2008–2019
- Members: James Vitalo; Ricky Singh; Chris Smith; Danny Smith
- Past members: Nick Brianza; David Jaycox; Reggie McCafferty; John T. Lopez; Steven DiGenio; Tone Corallo

Backtrack was an American hardcore punk band from Long Island, New York, founded in 2008.

== History ==
Backtrack began in 2008 with the release of a demo titled The '08 Demo via Flatspot Records. They released an EP in 2009 via 6131 Records titled Deal With The Devil.

Backtrack released their first full-length album in 2011 titled Darker Half via Reaper Records.

In 2013, Backtrack released a 7" via Bridge 9 Records titled Can't Escape.

In 2014, Backtrack released their second full-length album via Bridge 9 Records titled Lost In Life.

In 2019, the band announced it would be breaking up doing a final tour around America, Asia, and Australia which ended in Amityville, New York on November 30, 2019.

Vitalo went on to form the artist management company Gold Theory Artists.

== Band members ==
=== Final Members ===
- James Vitalo – vocals (2008-2019)
- Ricky Singh – guitar
- Chris Smith – guitar
- Danny Smith – bass

=== Past Members ===
- Nick Brienza – bass
- David Jaycox – bass
- Reggie McCafferty – bass
- John T. Lopez – drums
- Steven DiGenio – drums
- Brian Rutter – drums
- Tone Corallo – drums

== Discography ==
Studio albums

- Darker Half (2011, Reaper)
- Lost in Life (2014, Bridge Nine)
- Bad to My World (2017, Bridge Nine)

EPs and demos

- The '08 Demo (2008, Flatspot)
- Deal with the Devil (2009, 6131)
- Can't Escape (2013, Bridge Nine)
- "Bad to My World" b/w "Breaking Loose" – Flexi/Zine (2017, Bridge Nine)
