= Never Enough Tour =

2025 concert tour by Turnstile

- World tour by Turnstile
- Promotional poster for the European leg of the tour.
- Location: Europe; North America; Oceania; Latin America; Asia
- Associated album: Never Enough
- Start date: September 15, 2025
- End date: Ongoing
- Legs: 9
- No. of shows: 94
- Supporting acts: Agnostic Front; Amyl and the Sniffers; Angel Du$t; Basement; Boy Harsher; Ceremony; Clipse; Cold World; Collateral; Blood Orange; Die Spitz; Dynamite; Febuary; Fiddlehead; The Garden; Hatebreed; High Vis; Hitech; Jane Remover; Julie; King's Command; Mall Grab; Mannequin Pussy; Nourished By Time; Pennywise; Pluto's Kiss; Porches; Saya Gray; Speed; Slayyyter; Terror; Texas is the Reason; Thundercat; Trash Talk; Vince Staples; Yves Tumor

Turnstile concert chronology
- Turnstile Love Connection Tour (2022); Never Enough Tour (2025-2026)

The Never Enough Tour is a concert tour by American hardcore punk band Turnstile, in support of their fourth studio album, Never Enough.

The North American leg was announced on June 10, 2025, 4 days after the release of Never Enough. It began on September 15 in Nashville, Tennessee, and finished on January 11, 2026 in Red Hill, Australia. An extension of the tour, titled the Never Enough Tour Pt. 2, embarked in the autumn of 2026.

== Set list ==
The following set list was obtained from the concert held on November 2, 2025, at the O2 Academy in Glasgow, Scotland. It does not represent all concerts for the duration of the tour.

1. "Never Enough"
2. "T.L.C. (Turnstile Love Connection)"
3. "Endless"
4. "I Care" / "Dull"
5. "Don't Play"
6. "Real Thing"
7. "Drop"
8. "Light Design"
9. "Come Back for More" / "Fazed Out"
10. "Sunshower"
11. "7"
12. "Keep It Moving"
13. "Pushing Me Away"
14. "Fly Again"
15. "Sole"
16. "Ceiling"
17. "Seein' Stars"
18. "Holiday"
19. "Look Out for Me"
  Encore
20. "Mystery"
21. "Blackout"
22. "Birds"

== Tour dates ==
List of 2025 concerts, showing date, city, country, venue, and opening act(s).
| Date | City | Country | Venue | Opening act(s) |
|---|---|---|---|---|
| September 15 | Nashville | United States | The Pinnacle | Speed; Jane Remover |
| September 17 | Asheville | United States | Asheville Yards | Mannequin Pussy; Speed; Jane Remover |
| September 19 | Philadelphia | United States | Mann Center for the Performing Arts | Mannequin Pussy; Speed; Jane Remover |
| September 20 | Boston | United States | The Stage at Suffolk Downs | Mannequin Pussy; Speed; Jane Remover |
| September 21 | Buffalo | United States | Outer Harbor Live at Terminal B | Mannequin Pussy; Speed; Jane Remover |
| September 23 | Columbus | United States | KEMBA Live! | Blood Orange; Speed; Jane Remover |
| September 24 | Richmond | United States | Brown's Island | Blood Orange; Speed; Jane Remover |
| September 26 | Chicago | United States | Huntington Bank Pavilion | Mannequin Pussy; Speed; Jane Remover |
| September 27 | Minneapolis | United States | The Armory | Mannequin Pussy; Speed; Jane Remover |
| September 28 | Des Moines | United States | Water Works Park | Mannequin Pussy; Speed; Jane Remover |
| September 30 | Denver | United States | Project 70: Under the Bridge | Mannequin Pussy; Speed; Jane Remover |
| October 3 (Note: The performance on October 3, 2025 was part of Aftershock Festival 2025) | Sacramento | United States | Discovery Park | —N/a |
| October 4 | Los Angeles | United States | Exposition Park South Lawn | Amyl and the Sniffers; Speed; Jane Remover |
| October 5 | San Francisco | United States | Bill Graham Civic Auditorium | Amyl and the Sniffers; Speed; Jane Remover |
| October 7 | Seattle | United States | WaMu Theater | Amyl and the Sniffers; Speed; Jane Remover |
| October 8 | Portland | United States | McMenamins Edgefield | Amyl and the Sniffers; Speed; Jane Remover |
| October 10 | San Diego | United States | Gallagher Square | Amyl and the Sniffers; Speed; Jane Remover |
| October 11 | Mesa | United States | Mesa Amphitheatre | Amyl and the Sniffers; Speed; Jane Remover |
| October 14 | Austin | United States | Moody Amphitheater at Waterloo Park | Amyl and the Sniffers; Speed; Jane Remover |
| October 15 | Houston | United States | White Oak Music Hall | Amyl and the Sniffers; Speed; Jane Remover |
| October 16 | Fort Worth | United States | Panther Island Pavilion | Amyl and the Sniffers; Speed; Jane Remover |
| October 19 | Orlando | United States | Orlando Amphitheater | Amyl and the Sniffers; Speed; Jane Remover |
| November 1 (Note: Originally scheduled for October 31.) | Dublin | Ireland | 3Arena (Note: Originally scheduled for National Stadium.) | High Vis |
| November 2 | Glasgow | Scotland | O_{2} Academy | High Vis |
| November 3 | Manchester | England | Depot Mayfield | The Garden; High Vis |
| November 5 | London | England | Alexandra Palace | The Garden; High Vis |
| November 9 | Hamburg | Germany | Alsterdorfer Sporthalle | The Garden; High Vis |
| November 10 | Amsterdam | Netherlands | AFAS Live | The Garden; High Vis |
| November 12 | Milan | Italy | Alcatraz | The Garden; High Vis |
| November 14 | Berlin | Germany | UFO im Velodrom | The Garden; High Vis |
| November 16 | Paris | France | Le Zénith | The Garden; High Vis |
| November 18 | Munich | Germany | Zenith | The Garden; High Vis |
| November 20 | Düsseldorf | Germany | Mitsubishi Electric Halle | The Garden; High Vis |
| November 24 | Barcelona | Spain | Palau Sant Jordi | The Garden; High Vis |
| November 26 | Lisbon | Portugal | LAV - Lisboa ao Vivo | The Garden; High Vis |
| November 27 | Madrid | Spain | Palacio Vistalegre | The Garden; High Vis |
| December 29 (Note: The performance on December 29, 2025 was part of Rhythm & Vines Festival 2025) | Gisborne | New Zealand | Waiohika Estate | —N/a |
| December 31 (Note: The performance on December 31, 2025 was part of Beyond the Valley Festival 2025) | Hesse | Australia | Barunah Plains Homestead | —N/a |

List of 2026 concerts, showing date, city, country, venue, and opening act(s).
| Date | City | Country | Venue | Opening act(s) |
|---|---|---|---|---|
| January 1 | Melbourne | Australia | PICA | Basement |
| January 6 | Moore Park (Note: Promoted as Sydney) | Australia | Hordern Pavilion | Basement |
| January 9 | Brisbane | Australia | Riverstage | Basement |
| January 11 | Red Hill (Note: Promoted as Perth) | Australia | Red Hill Auditorium | Basement |
| March 13 (Note: The performance on March 13, 2026 was part of Lollapalooza Argentina Festival 2026) | Buenos Aires | Argentina | Hipódromo de San Isidro | —N/a |
| March 14 (Note: The performance on March 14, 2026 was part of Lollapalooza Chile Festival 2026) | Santiago | Chile | O'Higgins Park | —N/a |
| March 17 (Note: The performance on March 17, 2026 was part of Asunciónico Festival 2026) | Asunción | Paraguay | Parque Olímpico | —N/a |
| March 20 (Note: The performance on March 20, 2026 was part of Estéreo Picnic Festival 2026) | Bogotá | Colombia | Simón Bolívar Park | —N/a |
| March 22 (Note: The performance on March 22, 2026 was part of Lollapalooza Brazil Festival 2026) | São Paulo | Brazil | Autódromo de Interlagos | —N/a |
| March 28 (Note: The performance on March 28, 2026 was part of Pa'l Norte Festival 2026) | Monterrey | Mexico | Fundidora Park | —N/a |
| April 10 (Note: The performances on April 12 and 17, 2026, were part of the Coachella festival 2026.) | Indio | United States | Empire Polo Club | —N/a |
| April 17 | Indio | United States | Empire Polo Club | —N/a |
| May 8 (Note: The performance on May 8, 2026 was part of the Welcome to Rockville Festival 2026) | Daytona Beach | United States | Daytona International Speedway | —N/a |
| May 15 (Note: The performance on May 15, 2026 was part of the Kilby Block Party Festival 2026) | Salt Lake City | United States | Utah State Fair Park | —N/a |
| June 12 (Note: The performance on June 12, 2026 was part of the Bonnaroo Festival 2026) | Manchester | United States | Great Stage Park | —N/a |
| July 22 | Kawasaki | Japan | Club Citta | SAND True Fight |
| July 24 (Note: The performance on July 24, 2026 was part of the Fuji Rock Festival 2026) | Yuzawa | Japan | Naeba Ski Resort | —N/a |
| July 26 (Note: The performance on July 26, 2026 was part of the Once Universe Festival 2026) | Seoul | South Korea | Seoul Grand Park Parking Lot | —N/a |
| August 1 (Note: The performance on August 1, 2026 was part of the Osheaga Festival 2026) | Montreal | Canada | Parc Jean-Drapeau | —N/a |
| August 2 (Note: The performance on August 2, 2026 was part of the Lollapalooza festival 2026) | Chicago | United States | Grant Park | —N/a |
| August 7 (Note: The performance on August 7, 2026 was part of the Outside Lands festival 2026) | San Francisco | United States | Golden Gate Park | —N/a |
| August 14 (Note: The performance on August 14, 2026 was part of the Syd for Solen festival 2026) | Copenhagen | Denmark | Valby Park | —N/a |
| August 15 (Note: The performance on August 15, 2026 was part of the Flow Festival 2026) | Helsinki | Finland | Suvilahti | —N/a |
| August 18 | Berlin | Germany | Parkbühne Wuhlheide | Deftones (supporting) |
| August 20 (Note: The performance on August 20, 2026 was part of the Le Cabaret Vert Festival 2026) | Charleville-Mézières | France | Square Bayard | —N/a |
| August 21 (Note: The performance on August 21, 2026 was part of the Pukkelpop Festival 2026) | Hasselt | Belgium | Kiewit | —N/a |
| August 23 (Note: The performance on August 23, 2026 part of the Lowlands festival 2026) | Biddinghuizen | Netherlands | Walibi Holland | —N/a |
| August 26 | Halifax | England | Piece Hall | Dynamite |
| August 28 (Note: The performance on August 28, 2026 was part of the All Points East festival 2026) | London | England | Victoria Park | —N/a |
| August 29 (Note: The performance on August 29, 2026 was part of the Rock en Seine Festival 2026) | Saint-Cloud | France | Parc de Saint-Cloud | —N/a |
| August 30 (Note: The performance on August 30, 2026 was part of the Kalorama Festival 2026) | Lisbon | Portugal | Bela Vista Park | —N/a |
| September 5 (Note: The performance on September 5, 2026 was part of the Bumbershoot Festival 2026) | Seattle | United States | Seattle Center | —N/a |
| September 9 | Milwaukee | United States | The Eagles Ballroom | Texas is the Reason; Haywire |
| September 11 | Detroit | United States | Russell Industrial Center | Ceremony; Hitech; King's Command |
| September 12 | Toronto | Canada | Woodbine Park | Yves Tumor; Saya Gray; Pluto's Kiss |
| September 15 | Pittsburgh | United States | Stage AE | Thundercat; Angel Dust; Nourished by Time |
| September 16 | Cincinnati | United States | Andrew J. Brady Music Center | Porches |
| September 18 (Note: The performance on September 18, 2026 was part of the Shaky Knees Festival 2026) | Atlanta | United States | Piedmont Park | —N/a |
| September 19 | Pinellas Park (Note: Promoted as Tampa) | United States | England Brothers Park | Hatebreed; Cold World |
| September 20 | Miami | United States | Factory Town | Mall Grab; Cold World; Collateral |
| September 23 | Forest Hills (Note: Promoted as Queens) | United States | Forest Hills Stadium | Clipse; Julie |
| September 26 | Portland | United States | Thompson's Point | Yves Tumor; Fiddlehead |
| September 29 | Raleigh | United States | Red Hat Amphitheater | Yves Tumor; Angel Dust; Agnostic Front |
| October 2 (Note: The performances on October 2 and 9, 2026, were part of the Austin City Limits festival 2026.) | Austin | United States | Zilker Park | —N/a |
| October 5 (Note: The show was rescheduled from October 3 due to their Saturday Night Live performance and moved from The Zoo Amphitheater to The Criterion in the process.) | Oklahoma City | United States | The Criterion | Die Spitz |
| October 6 | Lawrence | United States | On the Hill | Slayyyter; Die Spitz |
| October 7 | Sauget (Note: Promoted as St. Louis) | United States | Arsenal BG Ballpark | Vince Staples; Die Spitz |
| October 9 | Austin | United States | Zilker Park | —N/a |
| October 11 (Note: The performance on October 11, 2026 was part of the Form Festival Festival 2026) | Mayer | United States | Arcosanti | —N/a |
| October 14 | Ventura | United States | Ventura County Fairgrounds | Pennywise; Die Spitz |
| October 15 | North Las Vegas (Note: Promoted as Las Vegas) | United States | The Amp at Craig Ranch Regional Park | Vince Staples; Trash Talk; Febuary |
| October 18 | Santa Ana | United States | The Observatory Festival Grounds | Boy Harsher; Terror |
| October 24 | Washington | United States | Washington Monument | —N/a |
| November 14 (Note: The performance on November 14, 2026 was part of the Camp Flog Gnaw Carnival Festival 2026) | Los Angeles | United States | Dodger Stadium | —N/a |
