= Brendan Yates =

American singer & drummer (born 1990)

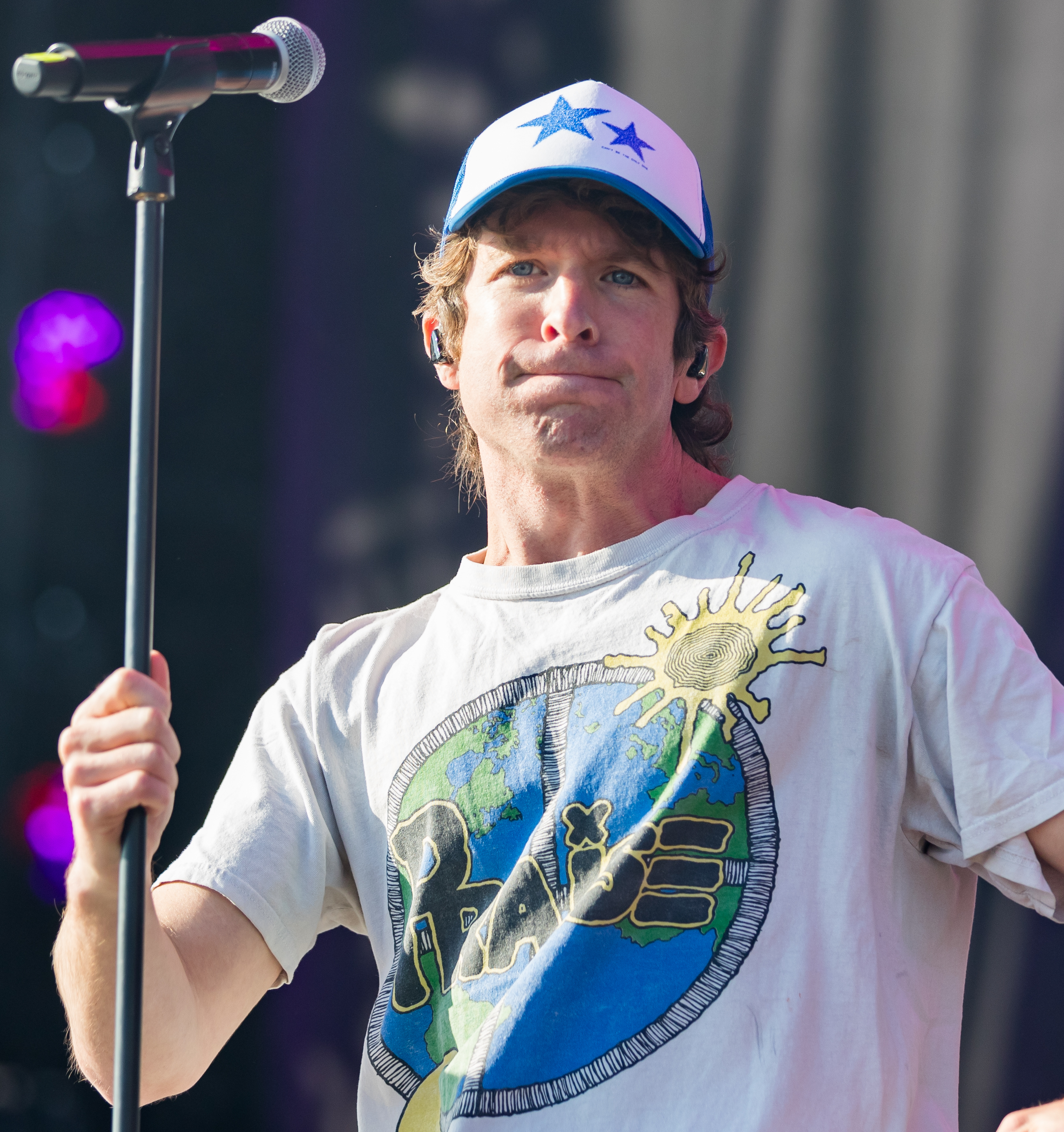
- Yates performing in 2023

Background information
- Born: February 20, 1990 (age 36); Baltimore, Maryland, U.S.
- Genres: Hardcore punk; melodic hardcore; alternative rock; pop rock
- Occupations: Singer; musician; songwriter
- Instruments: Vocals; drums; keyboards; guitar
- Years active: 2009-present
- Member of: Turnstile; Trapped Under Ice
- Formerly of: Diamond Youth; Angel Du$t

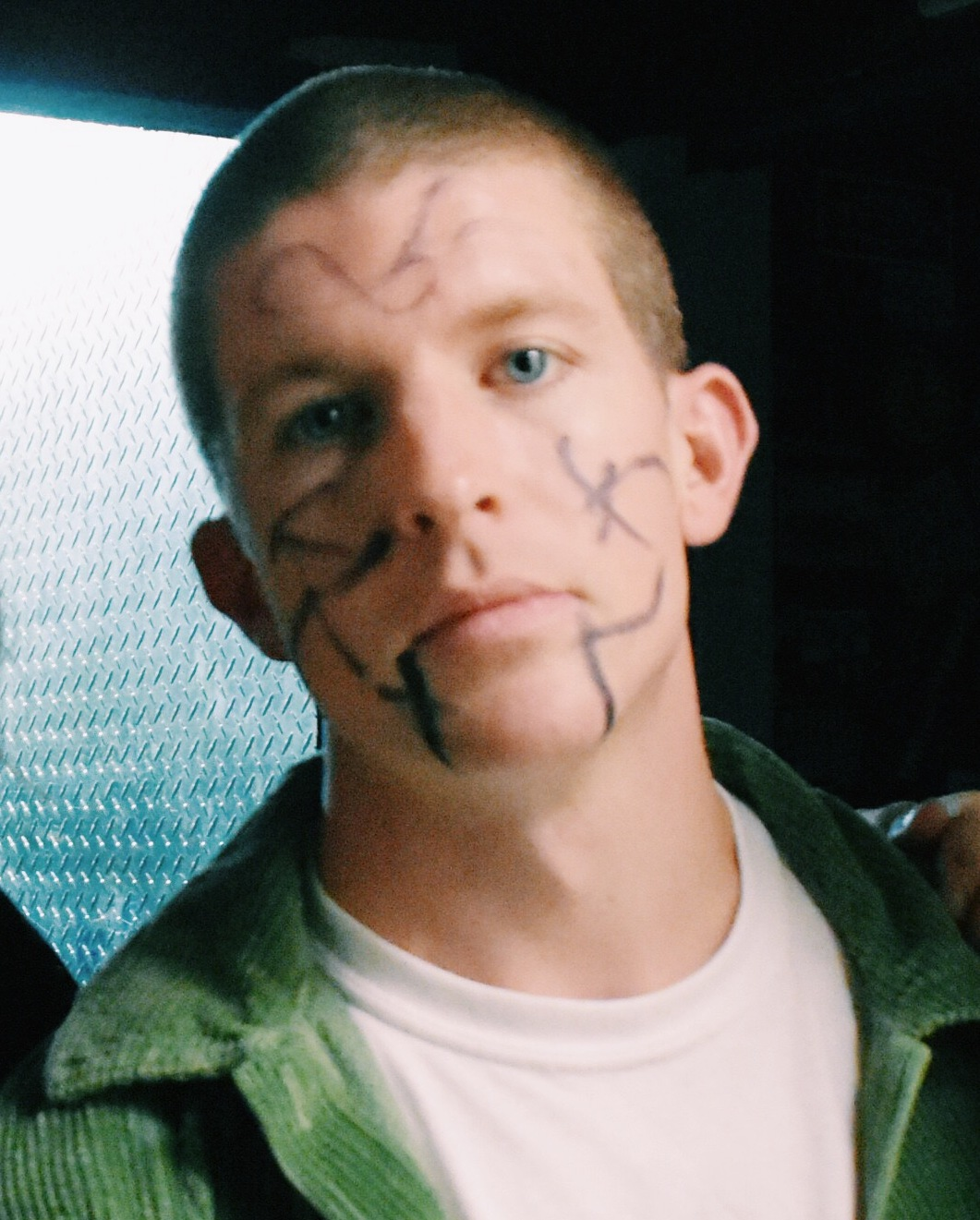
Yates in 2016

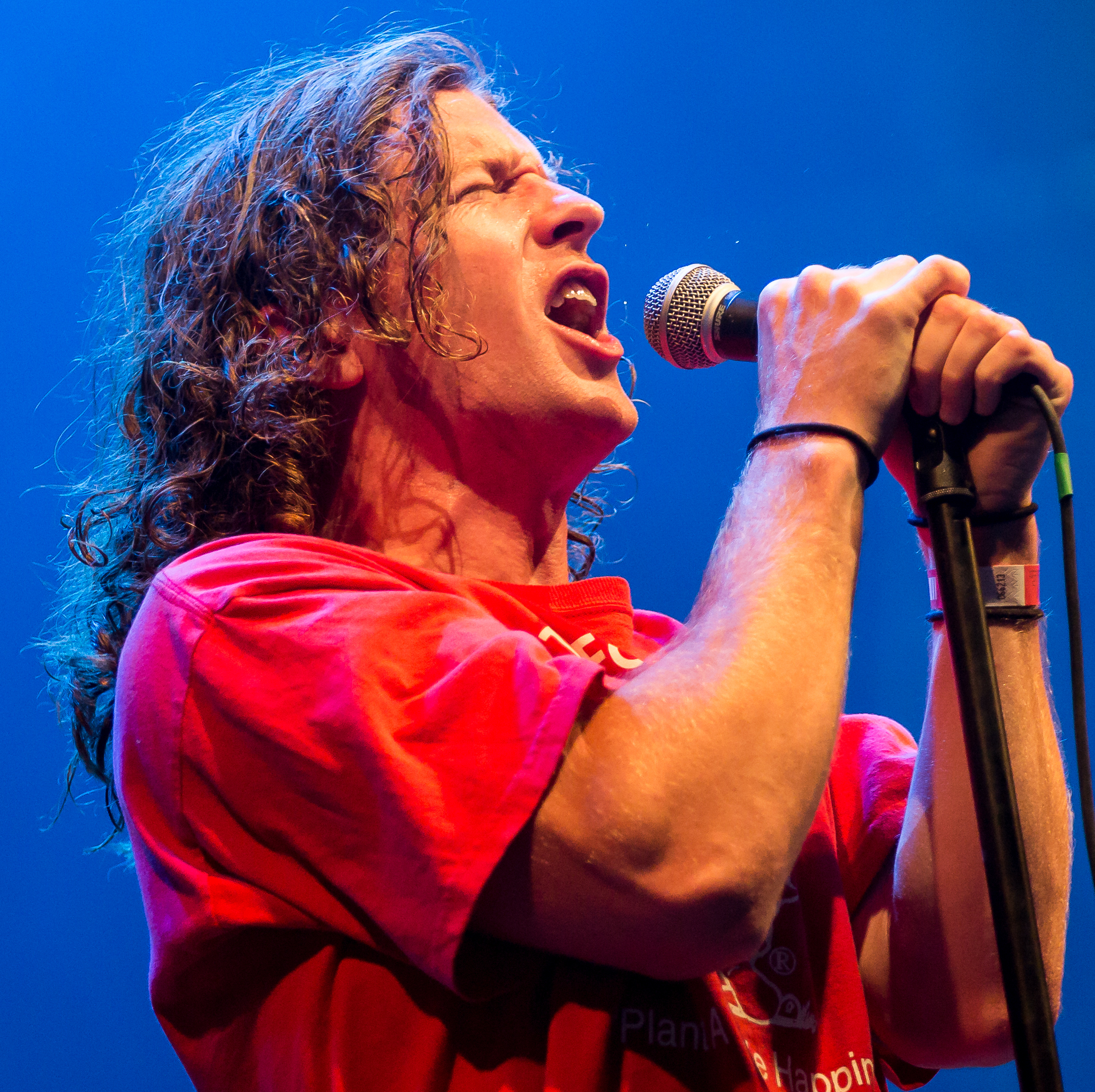
Yates performing at Ferropolis in 2019

Brendan Yates (born February 20, 1990) is an American singer, songwriter and musician who is the lead vocalist of the hardcore punk band Turnstile and drummer of Trapped Under Ice.

== Early life ==
Yates was born in Baltimore, Maryland. He grew up in Burtonsville and was involved in the hardcore punk scene and culture.

== Career ==
=== Diamond Youth ===
Brendan also played drums in Diamond Youth, which was a spinoff of Trapped Under Ice. As opposed to Trapped Under Ice, Diamond Youth was an alternative rock and indie rock band. They released 4 EPs (DMND, Don't Lose Your Cool, Orange, and Shake). Their debut studio album, Nothing Matters, released in 2015, after the 4 previous EPs. The band split later that year.

=== Turnstile ===
Yates is a founding member of Turnstile, which formed in 2010 out of the Baltimore hardcore scene, with Yates as lead vocalist.

In 2026, Turnstile founding guitarist Brady Ebert was arrested and charged with the attempted murder of Yates' father, William Yates. Ebert had been earlier fired from the band in 2022, with the band citing a "consistent pattern of harmful behavior".

=== Angel Du$t ===
Yates has also played with the melodic hardcore/rock band Angel Du$t, as their rhythm guitarist and a backing vocalist. The band, led by fellow Trapped Under Ice member Justice Tripp as lead vocalist, also included Turnstile member Daniel Fang, and Pat McCrory as founding members, with McCrory later joining Turnstile in 2016.

== Discography ==
=== Turnstile ===
- Nonstop Feeling (2015)
- Time & Space (2018)
- Glow On (2021)
- Never Enough (2025)
