= Turnstile (band) =

American rock band

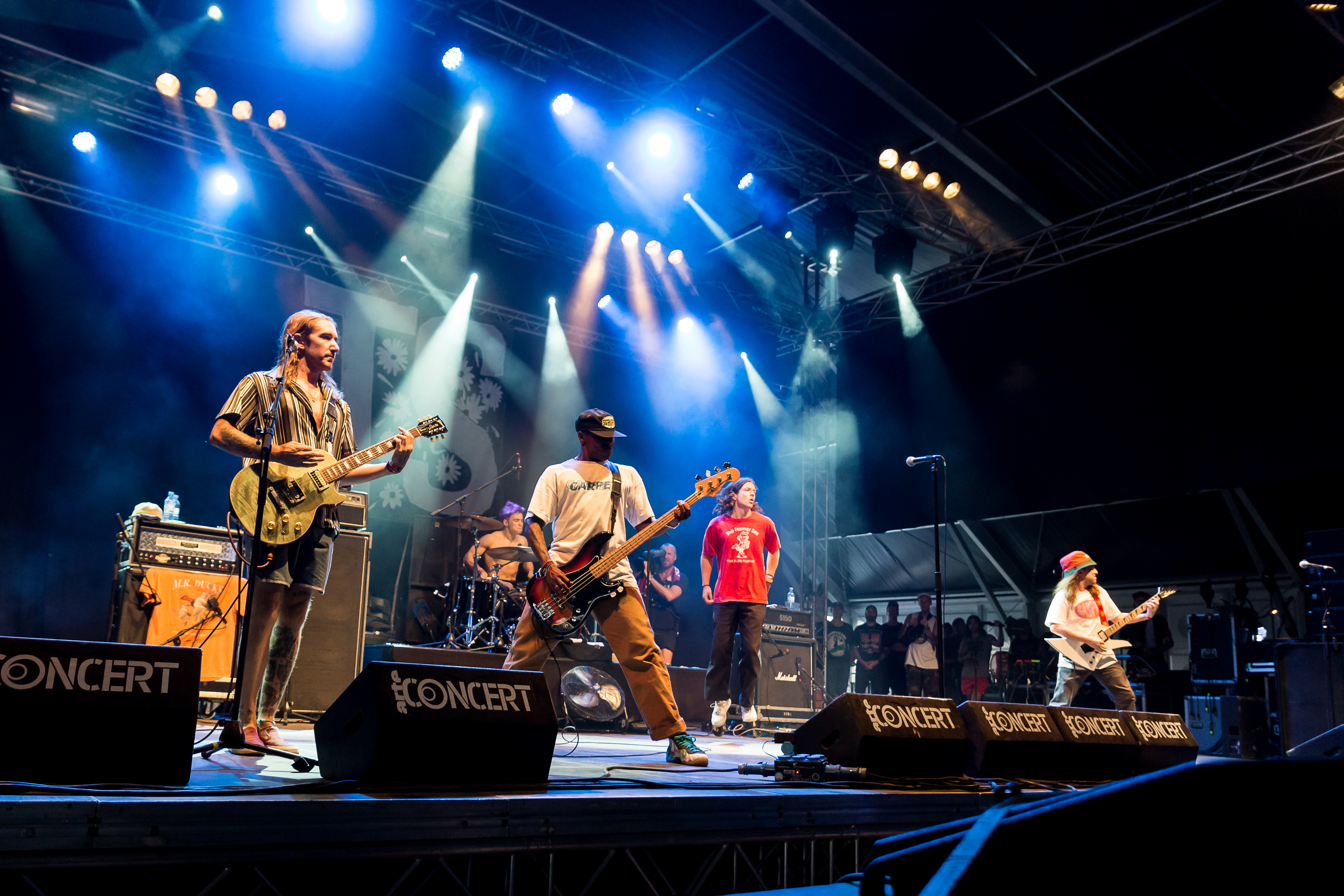
- Turnstile performing at Full Force at Ferropolis in Gräfenhainichen, Germany, June 2019

Background information
- Also known as: The Everything-You-Knows
- Origin: Baltimore, Maryland, U.S.
- Genres: Hardcore punk; melodic hardcore; alternative rock
- Years active: 2010–present
- Labels: Roadrunner; Reaper; Pop Wig
- Spinoffs: Angel Dust; Egg Men
- Spinoff of: Trapped Under Ice; Diamond Youth; One Step Too Many
- Members: Brendan Yates; Franz Lyons; Daniel Fang; Pat McCrory; Meg Mills
- Past members: Sean Cullen; Brady Ebert
- Website: turnstilehardcore.com

Turnstile is an American rock band from Baltimore, Maryland, formed in 2010. The band consists of lead vocalist Brendan Yates, guitarists Pat McCrory and Meg Mills, bassist Franz Lyons, and drummer Daniel Fang.

Originally a hardcore punk group, Turnstile's breakthrough third album Glow On was released in 2021, earning critical acclaim and three Grammy nominations. Their fourth album Never Enough was released in 2025 and charted in the top 10 of five countries, including the U.S. The album received five Grammy nominations, making Turnstile the first band to be nominated in the rock, alternative, and metal categories in the same year. The band won the Grammy Award for Best Metal Performance for their song "Birds" and Best Rock Album on February 1, 2026.

== History ==
=== 2010–2015: Early years and Nonstop Feeling ===
Turnstile was formed in 2010 and grew from Baltimore's hardcore scene. They released their debut EP, Pressure to Succeed, in 2011 and their second EP, Step 2 Rhythm, in 2013, both via Reaper Records. On January 13, 2015, Turnstile released their debut full-length album, Nonstop Feeling, also on Reaper Records. The album was recorded at Salad Days Studios with producer Brian McTernan. Supporting the release of the album, Turnstile went on both an East Coast and a West Coast tour with Superheaven, titled the Nonstop Feeling Tour. They also supported New Found Glory on their Spring 2015 tour. After the tour, their guitarist Sean Cullen stepped down, and a replacement was found in Pat McCrory of fellow Baltimore-based hardcore band Angel Dust.

=== 2016-2020: Move Thru Me, touring, and Share a View ===
On September 16, 2016, Turnstile released their third EP, titled Move Thru Me. The record charted at No. 14 on the Billboard Heatseekers Albums chart and No. 19 on the Hard Rock Albums chart. The band embarked on the Move Thru Me Tour across the U.S. with support from Angel Dust, Big Bite, Krimewatch, Fury, and Lock on select dates in the fall of 2016. The band began recording for their second album under Roadrunner Records in the fall of 2017, completing recording in early 2018. The record was produced by Will Yip at his Studio 4 recording studio. On February 23, 2018, the band released the album, titled Time & Space, their first release under a major label. The band traveled across the U.S. on the Time & Space Tour with support from Touché Amoré, Culture Abuse, and Razorbumps. A European leg followed with support from Fury, a South Korean and Southeast Asia leg, and a U.K. leg with support from Wicca Phase Springs Eternal and Big Cheese. Three of the album's tracks were re-worked with DJ and producer Mall Grab and released as an EP, titled Share a View, in January 2020.

=== 2021–2024: Glow On, Ebert's dismissal and touring ===
Turnstile released their fifth EP, Turnstile Love Connection, alongside an accompanying short film directed by Yates in June 2021. A week before the release of Glow On, the band performed a free show in Clifton Park, Baltimore collecting donations to benefit Healthcare for the Homeless on August 21, 2021. The album dropped on August 27, 2021 and it debuted at No. 30 on the Billboard 200. It received universal acclaim from critics and was No. 8 in Rolling Stone's Best 50 Albums of 2021 list. The band supported Suicideboys on tour from September to November 2021, and supported My Chemical Romance's North American Reunion Tour in August 2022.

On August 12, 2022, the press announced that the band had kicked out founding guitarist Brady Ebert, months before a headlining tour. Before then, Ebert had notably been absent from the band's tours, and had been replaced by Greg Cerwonka of Take Offense. Meg Mills, of Big Cheese and formerly Chubby and the Gang, was brought on as touring guitarist replacing Greg Cerwonka. Online publication Lambgoat claimed that the band's drummer, Daniel Fang, had filed a peace order against Ebert on August 4, 2022 but the case was dismissed on August 11 due to "no statutory basis of relief".

At the 65th Grammy Awards, held in February 2023, "Holiday" was nominated for Best Rock Performance, and "Blackout" was nominated for both Best Rock Song and Best Metal Performance. Turnstile continued to tour extensively throughout 2023, including supporting Blink-182 on the North American leg of their 2023 global tour. In August of the same year they released New Heart Designs, a joint EP with Canadian jazz band BadBadNotGood from Toronto, containing reworked versions of Turnstile's "Mystery", "Alien Love Call", and "Underwater Boi". In 2024, the band launched its own Converse shoes on 25 January and toured in Latin America (March 30 – April 16), Europe (June 14–28) and Asia (July 18 – August 2). They also played the No Values Festival on June 8, 2024, at Fairplex in Pomona, California.

=== 2025–present: Never Enough ===
In late March of 2025, a billboard promoting new music under the name Never Enough was spotted on Sunset Boulevard in Los Angeles teasing a release date of June 6, 2025 and confirming Meg Mills as an official member. On April 8, Turnstile released the lead single from the upcoming album of the same name, with a music video directed by band members Yates and McCrory. The band held a free benefit show in their hometown of Baltimore in May 2025, where they previewed the Never Enough record while raising money for Health Care for the Homeless. The band performed a record release show on June 5 in Brooklyn, New York at the Under the K Bridge venue.

Turnstile toured Europe in 2025 in promotion of Never Enough, with several festival appearances such as Primavera Sound, Outbreak Festival, and Glastonbury Festival. The band embarked on the Never Enough Tour through the United States and Europe in autumn and winter 2025, with support from Jane Remover and Speed on dates for North America and from Amyl and the Sniffers, Mannequin Pussy, and Blood Orange on select dates. The group extended the tour in the autumn of 2026 with support from Texas is the Reason, Haywire, Ceremony, HiTech, King's Command, Yves Tumor, Saya Gray, Pluto's Kiss, Thundercat, Angel Dust, Nourished by Time, Porches, Hatebreed, Cold World, Mall Grab, Collateral, Clipse, Julie, Fiddlehead, Agnostic Front, Die Spitz, Slayyyter, Vince Staples, Pennywise, Trash Talk, February, Boy Harsher, and Terror on select dates.

In April 2026, Ebert was charged with second-degree attempted murder and first-degree assault after allegedly intentionally hitting 79-year-old William Yates, frontman Brendan Yates' father, with a car. On indictment, Ebert was also charged with attempted first-degree murder, which carries a sentence of up to life in prison if convicted.

In August 2026, the band released their debut remix album, entitled Never Enough: Versions. The album features reworked versions of every song on Never Enough, and features artists such as Elton John, Four Tet, Hayley Williams, Dying Fetus, Alex G and Panda Bear.

On October 24, 2026, the band performed a free benefit concert at the Washington Monument which raised over $150,000 for humanitarian aid in Palestine, Sudan, and Lebanon. Organizers estimated an attendance of 60,000 people.

== Musical style and influences ==
Critics and journalists have categorized Turnstile's music as being hardcore punk, melodic hardcore, and alternative rock. In interviews, the members describe their own music as hardcore.

Ethan Stewart, a writer from PopMatters and former Revolver editor Eli Enis said the band is "pop-hardcore", alongside Angel Dust, Scowl and Higher Power. Stewart credited the band as building upon the alternative metal-meets-New York-style hardcore style of 1990s bands including Snapcase or Crown of Thornz, but says it additionally incorporates experimental influences including pop and funk music. Turnstile cite their influences as Cro-Mags, Rage Against the Machine, Inside Out, Bad Brains, Breakdown, Madball and Sade.

== Band members ==
=== Current members ===
- Brendan Yates – lead vocals, percussion (2010–present), piano, keyboards, synthesizer (2021–present)
- Daniel Fang – drums, programming, percussion (2010–present)
- "Freaky" Franz Lyons – bass, percussion, backing and occasional lead vocals (2010–present)
- Pat McCrory – lead guitar (2022–present), backing vocals (2016–present), rhythm guitar (2016–2025)
- Meg Mills – rhythm guitar, backing vocals (2025–present; touring musician 2023–2025)

=== Former members ===
- Sean "Coo" Cullen – rhythm guitar (2010–2016)
- Brady Ebert – lead guitar, backing vocals (2010–2022)

=== Former touring musicians ===
- Greg Cerwonka – lead and rhythm guitar, backing vocals (2022–2023)

== Discography ==
=== Studio albums ===
Title	Album details	Peak chart positions									
Title	Album details	US	AUS	AUT	BEL (FL)	CAN	GER	NZ	SPA	SWI	UK
Nonstop Feeling	Released: January 14, 2015; Label: Reaper Records; Formats: CD, digital download, vinyl	— (Note: Nonstop Feeling did not enter the US Billboard 200, but peaked at number 22 on the US Heatseekers Albums Chart.)	—	—	—	—	—	—	—	—	— (Note: Nonstop Feeling did not enter the UK Albums Chart, but peaked at number 32 on the UK Record Store Chart.)
Time & Space	Released: February 23, 2018; Label: Roadrunner Records; Formats: CD, digital download, vinyl	— (Note: Time & Space did not enter the US Billboard 200, but peaked at number one on the US Heatseekers Albums Chart.)	—	—	—	—	89	—	—	—	— (Note: Time & Space did not enter the UK Albums Chart, but peaked at number 38 on the UK Record Store Chart.)
Glow On	Released: August 27, 2021; Label: Roadrunner; Formats: CD, digital download, vinyl	30	82	75	93	—	9	—	98	30	62
Never Enough	Released: June 6, 2025; Label: Roadrunner; Formats: CD, cassette, digital download, vinyl	9	5	25	5	43	7	24	63	23	11
"—" denotes a recording that did not chart or was not released in that territory.

=== Remix albums ===
Title	Album details
Never Enough: Versions	Released: August 28, 2026; Label: Roadrunner; Formats: Streaming

=== EPs ===
Title	EP details	Peak chart positions			
Title	EP details	US Heat.	US Hard Rock	US Vinyl	UK Sales
Pressure to Succeed	Released: April 26, 2011; Label: Reaper; Formats: Digital download, 7" vinyl	—	—	—	—
Step 2 Rhythm	Released: February 7, 2013; Label: Reaper; Formats: Digital download, 7" vinyl	—	—	—	—
Move Thru Me	Released: September 16, 2016; Label: Pop Wig; Formats: Digital download, 7" vinyl	14	19	17	— (Note: Move Thru Me did not enter the UK Albums Chart, but peaked at number 27 on the UK Physical Singles Chart.)
Share a View (with Mall Grab)	Released: January 7, 2020; Label: Roadrunner; Formats: Digital download, cassette tape, 12" vinyl	—	—	—	—
Turnstile Love Connection	Released: June 27, 2021; Label: Roadrunner; Formats: Streaming, short film	N/A			
New Heart Designs (with BadBadNotGood)	Released: August 11, 2023; Label: Roadrunner; Formats: Streaming, 12" vinyl	—	—	—	86
"—" denotes a recording that did not chart.

=== Demos ===
Title	Album details
Demo	Released: Summer 2010; Label: Reaper; Formats: digital download

=== Bootlegs ===
Year	Album details
Live Series	Released: 2014; Label: Moshers Delight; Formats: Cassette, digital download

=== Singles ===
Title	Year	Peak chart positions									Album
Title	Year	US Alt.	US Hard Rock	US Main.	US Rock	BEL (FL)	CAN Main. Rock	CAN Mod. Rock	COL Ang. Air.	EST Air.	Album
"Come Back for More" / "Harder on You"	2016	—	—	—	—	—	—	—	—	—	Move Thru Me
"Come Back for More" / "Harder on You"	2016	—	—	—	—	—	—	—	—	—	Move Thru Me
"Real Thing"	2017	—	—	—	—	—	—	—	—	—	Time & Space
"Generator"	2017	—	—	—	—	—	—	—	—	—	Time & Space
"Moon"	2018	—	—	—	—	—	—	—	—	—	Time & Space
"I Don't Wanna Be Blind"	2018	—	—	—	—	—	—	—	—	—	Time & Space
"Mystery"	2021	8	23	16	— (Note: "Mystery" did not enter the Hot Rock & Alternative Songs chart, but peaked at number 12 on the Rock & Alternative Airplay chart.)	—	—	—	—	—	Glow On
"Alien Love Call" (featuring Blood Orange)	2021	—	—	—	—	—	—	—	—	—	Glow On
"Blackout"	2021	—	22	35	—	—	—	—	—	—	Glow On
"Fly Again"	2021	—	—	—	—	—	—	—	—	—	Glow On
"New Heart Design"	2022	—	—	—	—	—	—	—	—	—	Glow On
"Holiday"	2022	10	25	20	— (Note: "Holiday" did not enter the Hot Rock & Alternative Songs chart, but peaked at number 22 on the Rock & Alternative Airplay chart.)	—	—	—	—	—	Glow On
"Never Enough"	2025	1	7	—	42	—	20	11	15	178	Never Enough
"Seein' Stars" / "Birds"	2025	—	—	—	—	50	—	—	—	48	Never Enough
"Seein' Stars" / "Birds"	2025	—	23	—	—	—	—	—	—	—	Never Enough
"Look Out for Me"	2025	2	7	4	— (Note: "Look Out for Me" did not enter the Hot Rock & Alternative Songs chart, but peaked at number three on the Rock & Alternative Airplay chart.)	—	14	32	—	—	Never Enough
"—" denotes a recording that did not chart or was not released in that territory.

=== Other charted songs ===
Title	Year	Peak chart positions				Album
Title	Year	US Hard Rock	US Rock	EST Air.	NZ Hot	Album
"Sole"	2025	15	—	—	—	Never Enough
"I Care"	2025	—	49	93	30	Never Enough
"Dreaming"	2025	20	—	61	—	Never Enough
"Light Design"	2025	21	—	—	—	Never Enough
"Dull"	2025	13	—	—	—	Never Enough
"Sunshower"	2025	22	—	—	—	Never Enough
"—" denotes a recording that did not chart or was not released in that territory.

== Awards and nominations ==
Organization	Year	Category	Nominated work	Result	Ref.
Grammy Awards	2023	Best Metal Performance	"Blackout"	Nominated	
Grammy Awards	2023	Best Rock Song	"Blackout"	Nominated	
Grammy Awards	2023	Best Rock Performance	"Holiday"	Nominated	
Grammy Awards	2026	Best Rock Performance	"Never Enough"	Nominated	
Grammy Awards	2026	Best Rock Song	"Never Enough"	Nominated	
Grammy Awards	2026	Best Metal Performance	"Birds"	Won	
Grammy Awards	2026	Best Rock Album	Never Enough	Won	
Grammy Awards	2026	Best Alternative Music Performance	"Seein' Stars"	Nominated	
UK Music Video Awards	2025	Best Rock Video – International	"Never Enough"	Nominated	

== Tours ==
- On Tour There Is No Law (U.S.) — September 30–October 14, 2013
  - Support for Twitching Tongues (September 30–October 14) alongside Stigmata, Downpresser, and Angel Dust
- Spring 2014 Tour (U.S.) — February 5–15, 2015
  - Support from Diamond Youth, Turnover (February 5–12), Angel Dust, and Blind Justice
- Bane Farewell Tour (U.S.) — May 23–June 2, 2014
  - Support for Bane alongside Take Offense
- Set It Off 20th Anniversary Tour (U.S.) — December 5–14, 2014
  - Support for Madball alongside Death Before Dishonor, Take Offense, and Downpresser
- Nonstop Feeling East Coast Tour (U.S.) — February 12–22, 2015
  - Support from Superheaven, Freedom, True Love, Adventures (February 22), and Fiddlehead (February 22)
- Nonstop Feeling West Coast Tour (U.S.) — February 27–March 4, 2015
  - Support from Superheaven, Take Offense, Forced Order, and Seasons Change
- Sleep When I Die Tour (U.S.) — March 13–April 12, 2015
  - Support for New Found Glory alongside This Wild Life and Turnover
- The Life & Death Tour 2015 (U.S.) — August 6–31, 2015
  - Support for Bane alongside Forced Order, Mizery (August 9–28), Malfunction, Power Trip (August 24–30), Death Threat (August 7), Bitter End (August 29) and Crown of Thornz (August 14–16, August 26–28)
- Europe Tour 2015 (Europe) — November 18–30, 2015
  - Support from Forced Order
- Self-Titled Tour (U.K.) — December 1–12, 2015
  - Support for The Story So Far and Drug Church
- New Zealand 2016 (New Zealand) — January 7–9, 2016
  - Support from Out Cold, Hammer Time and Lookin' Up
- Australia 2016 (Australia) — January 13–24, 2016
  - Support from Born Free
- Spring 2016 Tour (U.S.) — April 6–May 1, 2016
  - Support for Basement alongside Defeater and Colleen Green
- European Summer 2016 (U.K. and Europe)
  - Support for Backtrack (June 20–23) alongside Higher Power (June 26–30)
- Spring 2017 Tour (U.S.) — May 13–21, 2017
  - Support for The Story So Far alongside Drug Church
  - Included appearances at Northern Invasion Fest and Rock on the Range
- Fall 2017 Tour (U.S.) — November 7–December 3, 2017
  - Support for The Story So Far alongside Drug Church
- The Good Nature Australian Tour (Australia) — March 5–13, 2018
  - Support for Turnover
- Time & Space Tour (U.S.) — April 9–May 7, 2018
  - Support from Touché Amoré, Culture Abuse, and Razorbumps
- Time & Space S. Korea and Southeast Asia Tour (South Korea and Asia) — June 30–July 8, 2018
- Time & Space Europe Tour (U.K. and Europe) — June 14–July 13, 2018
  - Support from Fury (June 14–19, June 21–27)
  - Included appearances at 2000 Trees Festival and Resurrection Fest
- Celebrating 20 Years of Bull_ (U.S.) — November 12–December 16, 2018
  - Support for Every Time I Die alongside Angel Dust and Vein
- Australia Tour 2019 (Australia) — January 12–19, 2019
  - Co-headlined alongside Citizen
- Spring 2019 Tour (U.S.) — April 5–May 12, 2019
  - Support for Turnover alongside Reptaliens
- Share a View in Europe 2020 (U.K. and Europe) — March 3–15, 2020
  - Support from Gag, One Step Closer, and Glitterer
- Glow On Tour (Aug 22 – Sep 26, 2021)
  - Support from Show Me the Body (August 28–30), Never Ending Game (August 28–30), Gulch (August 30), Lil Ugly Mane (September 2), Narrow Head (September 2), Hey Cowboy! (September 2), and Sexpill (September 2)
  - Included appearances at Firefly Festival, Louder Than Life Festival, Knotfest, and Furnace Fest
- North America (Sep 29 - Nov 17, 2021)
  - Supporting Suicideboys on the Grey Day 2021 tour
- Glow On Live in Europe (Jan 29 – Feb 5, 2022)
  - Support from Chubby and the Gang
- The Turnstile Love Connection Tour (Feb 22 – May 29, 2022)
  - Support from Citizen, Ceremony, Ekulu, Truth Cult, Coco & Clair Clair (February 23 and 24), Special Interest (May 22), and Beach Fossils (May 22)
- Glow On Live in Europe (Jun 19 – Aug 19, 2022)
- North America (Aug 21 – 26, 2022)
  - Supporting My Chemical Romance on the Reunion Tour
- The Turnstile Love Connection Tour (Oct 3 – Nov 21, 2022)
  - Support from Snail Mail and JPEGMafia (October 3–31)
- Australasia (Jan 29 - Feb 19, 2023)
  - Performed several dates of the 2023 Laneway Festival, alongside headlining shows supported by Speed
- North America (Feb 28 - May 27, 2023)
  - Supporting Blink-182 on World Tour 2023/2024 from May 4
- Europe (Jun 1 - 11 Jun 11, 2023)
- North America (Jun 14 - Jul 16, 2023)
  - Supporting Blink-182 on World Tour 2023/2024
- Europe (Aug 17 - 25, 2023)
- North America (Sep 15 - Nov 11, 2023)
- Latin America / Europe / Asia 2024 (Mar 30 - Aug 2, 2024)
- Europe / United Kingdom 2025 (Jun 7 - 29 2025)
- Never Enough Tour (2025)
