= Never Enough (Turnstile album) =

Studio album by Turnstile
- Released: June 6, 2025
- Genres: Hardcore punk; alternative rock
- Length: 45:14
- Label: Roadrunner
- Producer: Brendan Yates

Turnstile chronology
| New Heart Designs (2023) | Never Enough (2025) |

Turnstile studio album chronology
| Glow On (2021) | Never Enough (2025) | Never Enough: Versions (2026) |

Singles from Never Enough
- 1. "Never Enough" Released: April 8, 2025; 2. "Seein' Stars" / "Birds" Released: April 30, 2025; 3. "Look Out for Me" Released: May 20, 2025

Never Enough (stylised in all caps) is the fourth studio album by American rock band Turnstile, released via Roadrunner Records on June 6, 2025. It is their first album without founding member Brady Ebert following his 2022 departure, and their first to feature guitarist Meg Mills. (Note: Mills's involvement in the recording of Never Enough is uncertain, due to conflicting credits. According to initial sources, she did not perform on the album; however, she is credited with playing guitar on the album in both its physical and digital liner notes.) Ahead of the official release, on May 12, 2025 the band performed a free show in their hometown of Baltimore raising money for Healthcare for the Homeless. The album received critical acclaim and became the band's highest-charting album to date in several countries. The album won Best Rock Album at the 68th Annual Grammy Awards, and the single "Birds" won the award for Best Metal Performance.

== Promotion ==
Never Enough was initially promoted through a billboard on Sunset Boulevard in March 2025, teasing a release date of June 6 the same year and confirming Mills as an official member. On April 8, 2025, Turnstile released the lead single from the album, "Never Enough", along with a music video directed by band members Brendan Yates and Pat McCrory. On April 30, the band released a dual single, "Seein' Stars" / "Birds", with a music video also directed by Yates and McCrory.

Never Enough is accompanied by a visual album, which premiered at the 2025 Tribeca Festival and in theaters June 5, 2025. The trailer was released on May 7, 2025. In support of the album, the band embarked on the Never Enough Tour in Europe and North America from September 15 to October 19, 2025.

== Critical reception ==
Professional ratings
Aggregate scores
| Source | Rating |
|---|---|
| AnyDecentMusic? | 8.1/10 |
| Metacritic | 83/100 |
Review scores
| Source | Rating |
| AllMusic | 4.5/5 stars |
| The Arts Desk | 5/5 stars |
| The Guardian | 4/5 stars |
| Kerrang! | 5/5 |
| Louder Sound | 4.5/5 stars |
| NME | 5/5 stars |
| Paste | 7.8/10 |
| Pitchfork | 7.8/10 |
| Rolling Stone | 3.5/5 stars |
| The Skinny | 4/5 stars |

Never Enough received a score of 83 out of 100 on review aggregator Metacritic based on 19 critics' reviews, indicating "universal acclaim".

Kerrang!'s Luke Morton described the album as "cinematic in its scope and execution". He emphasizes the band's fearless experimentation, noting that "Never Enough is best digested whole, immersing oneself in the singular vision of a band who create without barriers or predetermined convention." The Guardian's Alexis Petridis highlighted its genre-defying approach: "There's so much else happening, a profusion of ideas so deftly handled that it never feels sprawling or indulgent." Petridis notes the band's seamless integration of diverse elements, from flute solos by Shabaka Hutchings to collaborations with artists like Dev Hynes and Hayley Williams, stating that "Turnstile effectively balances bold innovation with conciseness, reflecting their hardcore heritage while expanding their musical footprint."

Pitchfork's Nina Corcoran drew parallels to 1980s nostalgia, stating that tracks like "Light Design" merge Turnstile's rhythms with "The Police's pedalboards and cool-toned synths," and that "I Care" features drumrolls and gated reverb reminiscent of Stewart Copeland. Craig Angus of The Skinny compared the latter to the synth-pop bands OMD and Duran Duran, and declared, "If its predecessor [Glow On] took you on a rollercoaster ride, Never Enough is a window seat with plenty of space for reflection... There are glorious moments throughout."

== Accolades ==
=== Year-end lists ===
A "—" denotes the publication's list is in no particular order, and Never Enough did not rank numerically.

| Publication | Country | Accolade | Rank | Ref. |
|---|---|---|---|---|
| Billboard | US | The 50 Best Albums of 2025: Staff List | 10 | |
| Consequence | US | Top 50 Albums of 2025 | 18 | |
| Crack Magazine | UK | The Top 50 Albums of the Year | 19 | |
| Exclaim! | CA | Exclaim!'s 50 Best Albums of 2025 | 4 | |
| The Guardian | UK | The 50 best albums of 2025 | 15 | |
| NME | UK | The 50 best albums of 2025 | 8 | |
| Rolling Stone | US | The 50 Best Albums of 2025 | 31 | |
| Kerrang! | UK | The 50 best albums of 2025 | 1 | |

=== Grammy Awards and nominations ===
Grammy Awards and nominations for Never Enough
| Year | Nominee / work | Award | Result |
|---|---|---|---|
| 2026 | Never Enough | Best Rock Album | Won |
| 2026 | "Never Enough" | Best Rock Performance | Nominated |
| 2026 | "Birds" | Best Metal Performance | Won |
| 2026 | "Seein' Stars" | Best Alternative Music Performance | Nominated |

== Commercial performance ==
In the United States, Never Enough debuted at number nine on the Billboard 200, earning 38,000 album-equivalent units in its first week, including 27,500 in pure album sales. This marked Turnstile's highest-charting album in the country. The album also debuted at number one on the Top Hard Rock Albums chart, number two on the Top Rock & Alternative Albums chart, and number four on the Top Album Sales chart.

== Track listing ==
All tracks are written by Turnstile.

Never Enough track listing
| No. | Title | Length |
|---|---|---|
| 1. | "Never Enough" | 4:47 |
| 2. | "Sole" | 3:25 |
| 3. | "I Care" | 3:53 |
| 4. | "Dreaming" | 2:36 |
| 5. | "Light Design" | 2:10 |
| 6. | "Dull" | 2:19 |
| 7. | "Sunshower" | 3:40 |
| 8. | "Look Out for Me" | 6:44 |
| 9. | "Ceiling" | 1:13 |
| 10. | "Seein' Stars" | 3:07 |
| 11. | "Birds" | 2:26 |
| 12. | "Slowdive" | 3:33 |
| 13. | "Time Is Happening" | 2:07 |
| 14. | "Magic Man" | 3:14 |
| Total length: | | 45:14 |

== Personnel ==
Credits adapted from digital liner notes.

=== Turnstile ===
- Brendan Yates – vocals, synthesizer, keyboards, production, art direction
- Franz Lyons – bass
- Pat McCrory – guitar
- Daniel Fang – drums
- Meg Mills – guitar

=== Additional contributors ===
- Will Yip – engineering, additional production
- Jason Lader – engineering
- Adam Hawkins – mixing
- Chris Gehringer – mastering
- Tyler Beans – additional engineering
- Jay Preston – additional assistant engineering
- Justin Bartlett – additional assistant engineering
- Josh Fernandez – additional assistant engineering
- Devonté Hynes – cello on "Never Enough" and "Look Out for Me", additional vocals on "Seein' Stars"
- Kae Murphy – trumpet on "Dreaming"
- Leland Whitty – saxophone on "Dreaming"
- A. G. Cook – additional production on "Dull"
- Shabaka Hutchings – flute on "Sunshower"
- Maestro Harrell – additional vocals on "Look Out for Me"
- Tom-E – additional vocals on "Look Out for Me"
- Hayley Williams – additional vocals on "Seein' Stars"
- Faye Webster – backing vocals on "Time Is Happening"
- Liam Benzvi – backing vocals on "Time Is Happening"
- Ridge Rhine – art layout
- Atiba Jefferson – front and back cover photos
- Alexis Gross – insert photos

== Never Enough: Versions ==
A remix album of Never Enough, titled Never Enough: Versions, was released on August 28, 2026. The album features contributions from A. G. Cook, Alex G, Angel Dust, Blood Orange, Brandon Woody, Chanel Beads, Dan Deacon, Dying Fetus, Elton John, Faye Webster, Floating Points, Four Tet, Hayley Williams, Julien Baker, Kettama, Mustafa, Nourished by Time, Oklou, Panda Bear, Porches, Rod Lee, Shabaka, and Slayyyter.

== Charts ==
=== Weekly charts ===
Weekly chart performance for Never Enough
| Chart (2025–2026) | Peak position |
|---|---|
| Australian Albums (ARIA) | 5 |
| Austrian Albums (Ö3 Austria) | 25 |
| Belgian Albums (Ultratop Flanders) | 5 |
| Belgian Albums (Ultratop Wallonia) | 18 |
| Canadian Albums (Billboard) | 43 |
| Croatian International Albums (HDU) | 2 |
| Dutch Albums (Album Top 100) | 26 |
| French Albums (SNEP) | 60 |
| French Rock & Metal Albums (SNEP) | 4 |
| German Albums (Offizielle Top 100) | 7 |
| Greek Albums (IFPI) | 33 |
| Hungarian Albums (MAHASZ) | 7 |
| Irish Albums (IRMA) | 75 |
| New Zealand Albums (RMNZ) | 24 |
| Portuguese Albums (AFP) | 46 |
| Scottish Albums (Official Charts) | 8 |
| Spanish Albums (PROMUSICAE) | 63 |
| Swiss Albums (Schweizer Hitparade) | 25 |
| UK Albums (Official Charts) | 11 |
| UK Rock & Metal Albums (Official Charts) | 1 |
| US Billboard 200 | 9 |

=== Year-end charts ===
Year-end chart performance for Never Enough
| Chart (2025) | Position |
|---|---|
| Croatian International Albums (HDU) | 19 |
