= Never Enough (Turnstile song) =

Single by Turnstile

from the album Never Enough
- Released: April 5, 2025
- Genre: Grunge; punk rock; shoegaze
- Length: 4:47
- Label: Roadrunner
- Producer: Brendan Yates

Turnstile singles chronology
"Holiday" (2022)	"Never Enough" (2025)	"Seein' Stars / Birds" (2025)

Music video
- "Never Enough" on YouTube

"Never Enough" (stylized in all uppercase) is a song by American hardcore punk band Turnstile, released as the lead single of their fourth studio album, Never Enough (2025). The track was written by the band and produced by lead vocalist Brendan Yates. Its release was accompanied by a music video and coincided with the announcement of the album. "Never Enough" reached number one on the Billboard Alternative Airplay chart in August 2025.

== Credits and personnel ==
Credits are adapted from iTunes.

Musicians

- Daniel Fang – drums
- Franz Lyons – bass
- Meg Mills – guitars
- Pat McCrory – guitars
- Brendan Yates – lead vocals, keyboards, production

Music video

- Director: Brendan Yates & Pat McCrory
- Creative director: Ian Hurdle
- Production company: Vizionary
- Producer: Evan McGillivray
- Director of photography: Ian Hurdle
- Production manager: Jose Rojas
- 1st AD: Andrei Mijailov & Mitch Jones
- Post: Slips Studios
- Post creative director: Anthony Miralles
- Editor: Anthony Miralles
- Colorist: Cameron Marygold
- Management: James Vitalo

== Charts ==
=== Weekly charts ===
Weekly chart performance for "Never Enough"
Chart (2025–2026)	Peak position
Canada Mainstream Rock (Billboard Canada)	20
Canada Modern Rock (Billboard Canada)	11
Colombia Anglo Airplay (Monitor Latino)	15
Estonia Airplay (TopHit)	178
US Alternative Airplay (Billboard)	1
US Hot Hard Rock Songs (Billboard)	24
US Hot Rock & Alternative Songs (Billboard)	42
US Rock & Alternative Airplay (Billboard)	7

=== Year-end charts ===
Year-end chart performance for "Never Enough"
Chart (2025)	Position
Canada Modern Rock (Billboard)	50
US Rock & Alternative Airplay (Billboard)	37
