= Time & Space =

Studio album by Turnstile
- Released: February 23, 2018
- Recorded: 2017–2018
- Genre: Hardcore punk • heavy hardcore • post-hardcore
- Length: 25:15
- Label: Roadrunner
- Producer: Will Yip

Turnstile chronology
Move Thru Me (2016)	Time & Space (2018)	Share a View (2020)

Turnstile studio chronology
Nonstop Feeling (2015)	Time & Space (2018)	Glow On (2021)

Singles from Time & Space
- 1. "Real Thing" Released: November 7, 2017; 2. "Generator" Released: December 14, 2017; 3. "Moon" Released: January 11, 2018; 4. "I Don't Wanna Be Blind" Released: February 6, 2018

Time & Space is the second studio album and major label debut by the American punk rock band Turnstile. It was released on February 23, 2018, through Roadrunner – the band's debut on the label. It is the first studio album to feature rhythm guitarist Pat McCrory.

Upon its release, the album was met with critical acclaim by contemporary music critics, and debuted at number one on the US Billboard Heatseekers chart and number fifteen on the Top Hard Rock Albums chart, selling 2,800 copies in its first week. "I Don't Wanna Be Blind" would later be featured on the soundtrack for WWE 2K22 and “Real Thing” would later be featured on the soundtrack for Tony Hawk’s Pro Skater 3+4.

== Background ==
After the release of their debut album in 2015 the band signed to Roadrunner Records to record and release their second album. Speaking to Noisey, lead vocalist Brendan Yates spoke about the band's decision to sign to a major label: "It's been super cool. The coolest part about it, and the thing that makes me feel good about being in a band, is that the process was really natural. They expressed interest in putting out our last LP. I think we met them in 2014 but, at that point, it didn't feel natural", going on to say "Obviously, we've grown up on some Roadrunner records, and we've known what the label is based off records that have been inspiring to us, like Madball, Biohazard, and Life of Agony".

== Recording ==
The album was recorded in 2017/18 with producer Will Yip at his Studio 4 recording facility in Conshohocken, Pennsylvania. Speaking to SPIN in early 2018 Brendan Yates spoke about the band's vision for the album; "It's just the idea of disconnecting oneself from situations and letting go, separating yourself," going on to say "It's just a lot of reflection, in that sense: stepping back and looking at the position you're in, the relationships you're in…[it's about] getting outside of your mind—and out of your body—to see the clearing."

== Release ==
The album was released worldwide on February 23, 2018, through Roadrunner Records on CD, 12" vinyl and through online services. In the US the record peaked at number one on the Billboard Heatseekers Albums chart, number four on the US Vinyl Albums chart and fifteen on the Top Hard Rock Albums. In Europe the album charted on the UK Rock and Metal Albums chart at number twelve and number eight nine on the German Albums chart.

== Critical reception ==
Professional ratings
Aggregate scores
Source	Rating
AnyDecentMusic?	6.7/10
Metacritic	81/100
Review scores
Source	Rating
DIY	4/5 stars
Drowned in Sound	7/10
Exclaim!	8/10
The Guardian	3/5 stars
Kerrang!	5/5
Pitchfork	5.4/10
Punknews.org (Staff)	4.5/5
Q	4/5 stars
Rock Sound	8/10
Tiny Mix Tapes	3.5/5

The album was met with critical acclaim upon release, holding an aggregated score of 81 on Metacritic based on 12 reviews. Writing for The New York Times, Jon Caramanica gave out praise: "Time & Space" is its outstanding second album, just over 25 minutes long, and an urgent, clear and bruising statement of purpose", adding "this album also has moments of lightness, mild turns in complementary directions that add breathing room and complexity". Will Richards, writing for DIY, gave the album 4 stars and proclaimed "Turnstile have made a name as one of the most exciting hardcore bands on the planet. Second offering 'Time & Space' hammers the point home, and is a huge hammer-blow". Concluding the article: "Sneaking under the half-hour mark, 'Time & Space' is a comprehensive thrash that places Turnstile as the most inventive, forward-thinking band in hardcore".

Drowned in Sound judged the album a 7/10, with reviewer Adam Turner-Heffer calling the record "easily the most impressive sounding record of their relatively short careers so far, without taking the energy away from their raw power." he did however have a few criticisms; "If there is a major criticism to be lobbed at Time & Space however, is that its one-noted nature will make it difficult for anyone outside of genre fans to want to reach out over and encourage a crossover appeal".

Pitchfork offered up a mixed review, summarizing reviewer Sam Lefebvre wrote "The 'experimentation' on the Baltimore band's latest album is hesitant and unfocused. It's a punishingly familiar collision of yesteryear's crossover rock with textbook hardcore bluster". The Guardian also gave it a mixed review, with Dave Simpson commenting on the short length of certain album tracks; "Former Lauryn Hill backing singer Tanikka Charraé turns up on Bomb's funky hip-hop interlude, but again it's over in seconds, and one wonders what they could have achieved by being even bolder."

Kerrang! magazine praised the album highly on release, awarding it their full 5-K rating, and later named it the best album of 2018 in their year-end list.

=== Accolades ===
Accolades for Time & Space
Publication	Accolade	Rank
Alternative Press	Alternative Press' Top 50 Albums of 2018	N/A
The A.V. Club	The A.V. Club's Top Punk and Hardcore Albums of 2018	N/A
Billboard	Billboard's Top 50 Albums of 2018 – Mid-Year	N/A
Blare	Blare's Top 50 Albums of 2018	37
BrooklynVegan	BrooklynVegan's Top 50 Albums of 2018	8
Consequence of Sound	Consequence of Sound's Top 25 Metal and Hard Rock Albums	7
Exclaim!	Exclaim!'s Top 10 Metal and Hardcore Albums of 2018	10
Exclaim!	Exclaim!'s Top 31 Albums of 2018 – Mid-Year	31
Kerrang!	Kerrang!'s Top 50 Albums of 2018	1
Kerrang!	Kerrang!'s Top 75 Albums of the Decade (2010s)	23
GQ	GQ's Top Albums of the Decade (2010s)	N/A
Loudwire	Loudwire's Top 30 Hard Rock Albums of 2018	15
The New York Times	The New York Times' Top 28 Albums of 2018	13
NME	NME's Top 100 Albums of 2018	35
NME	NME's Top 25 Albums of 2018 – Mid-Year	9
Revolver	Revolver's Top 30 Albums of 2018	3
Rock Sound	Rock Sound's Top 50 Albums of 2018	33
Rolling Stone	Rolling Stone's Top 20 Metal Albums of 2018	9
Rolling Stone	Rolling Stone's Top 50 Albums of 2018 – Mid-Year	N/A
Stereogum	Stereogum's Top 50 Albums of 2018 – Mid-Year	37
Uproxx	Uproxx' Top 50 Albums of 2018 – Mid-Year	16

== Track listing ==
All tracks are written by Turnstile.

No.	Title	Length
1.	"Real Thing"	1:56
2.	"Big Smile"	1:29
3.	"Generator"	3:14
4.	"Bomb"	0:24
5.	"I Don't Wanna Be Blind"	2:04
6.	"High Pressure"	1:56
7.	"(Lost Another) Piece of My World"	1:51
8.	"Can't Get Away"	3:02
9.	"Moon"	1:53
10.	"Come Back for More/H.O.Y."	2:55
11.	"Right to Be"	2:05
12.	"Disco"	0:46
13.	"Time + Space"	1:40
Total length:		25:15

== Charts ==
Chart (2018)	Peak position
German Albums (Offizielle Top 100)	89
UK Rock & Metal Albums (Official Charts)	12
US Heatseekers Albums (Billboard)	1
US Top Hard Rock Albums (Billboard)	15
US Top Album Sales (Billboard)	67
US Vinyl Albums (Billboard)	4

== Release history ==
Country	Date	Format	Label	Catalog no.
Worldwide	February 23, 2018	CD; DL	Roadrunner Records	B078X9BG9K
Worldwide	February 23, 2018	LP; DL	Roadrunner Records	B078Y34FYY

== Personnel ==
Personnel per booklet.

Turnstile

- Brendan Yates – lead vocals
- Franz Lyons – bass, percussion, backing vocals; lead vocals (on "Moon")
- Brady Ebert – guitars
- Pat McCrory – guitars
- Daniel Fang – drums, percussion, backing vocals

Production

- Will Yip – production, sound engineer, mixing, programming
- Diplo – additional production - track 11
- Vince Ratti – mixing
- Ryan Smith – mastering
- Justin Anstotz – assistant engineer

Additional musicians

- Arthur Rizk – guitars
- Luke O'Reilly – piano
- Justice Tripp – backing vocals
- Tanikka Meyers – backing vocals
- Christina Halliday – backing vocals
- Jeff Caffey – backing vocals
