= Nonstop Feeling =

Studio album by Turnstile
- Released: January 13, 2015
- Recorded: 2014
- Genre: Hardcore punk
- Length: 27:34
- Label: Reaper

Turnstile chronology
| Step 2 Rhythm (2013) | Nonstop Feeling (2015) | Move Thru Me (2016) |

Turnstile studio chronology
| Nonstop Feeling (2015) | Time & Space (2018) |

Nonstop Feeling is the debut studio album by American hardcore punk band Turnstile. It was released on January 13, 2015, through Reaper Records. The album was reissued on 12" vinyl on September 23, 2016, through Roadrunner Records when the band signed to the label.

Nonstop Feeling sold 1,100 copies in its first week.

== Track listing ==
All tracks are written by Turnstile.

| No. | Title | Length |
|---|---|---|
| 1. | "Gravity" | 3:10 |
| 2. | "Drop" | 1:36 |
| 3. | "Fazed Out" | 2:52 |
| 4. | "Can't Deny It" | 2:44 |
| 5. | "Bleach Temple" (Instrumental) | 1:54 |
| 6. | "Bad Wave" | 2:16 |
| 7. | "Blue by You" | 1:18 |
| 8. | "Out of Rage" | 3:11 |
| 9. | "Bring It Back" | 2:20 |
| 10. | "Addicted" | 1:13 |
| 11. | "Love Lasso" (Instrumental) | 1:48 |
| 12. | "Stress" | 3:12 |
| Total length: | | 27:34 |

== Charts ==
| Chart (2015) | Peak position |
|---|---|
| US Heatseekers Albums (Billboard) | 22 |

| Chart (2025) | Peak position |
|---|---|
| Greek Albums (IFPI) | 83 |

== Release history ==
| Country | Date | Format | Label | Catalog no. |
|---|---|---|---|---|
| Worldwide | January 13, 2015 | CD; DL; LP | Reaper Records | RR72 |
| United States | September 23, 2016 | CD; LP | Roadrunner Records | 1686-174801 |
| United States | 2016 | CASS | Moshers Delight Records | MDR-24 |

== Personnel ==
Personnel per booklet.

Turnstile

- Brendan Yates – lead vocals
- Franz Lyons – bass
- Brady Ebert – guitars
- Sean Cullen – guitars
- Daniel Fang – drums, percussion

Additional musicians

- Greg Cerwonka – solo guitar (track 3)
- Justice Tripp – backing vocals (track 10)
- Adam Mercer – organ (track 11)

Production

- Brian McTernan – recording, production, sound engineer
- Will Beasley – recording, production (assistant), sound engineer
- Paul Leavitt – mastering
- Jillian Yoffe – artwork, layout, backing vocals
- Evan Wivell – layout, backing vocals
- Matt Caldwell – photography
- Kate Frese – photography
- Kencredible – photography
- Anne Kohler – photography
- Nic Samayoa – photography
- Danielle Parsons – photography
- Todd Pollock – photography
- Jesus Martinez – photography
- Justin Gilman – others
