= Diamond Youth =

American rock band

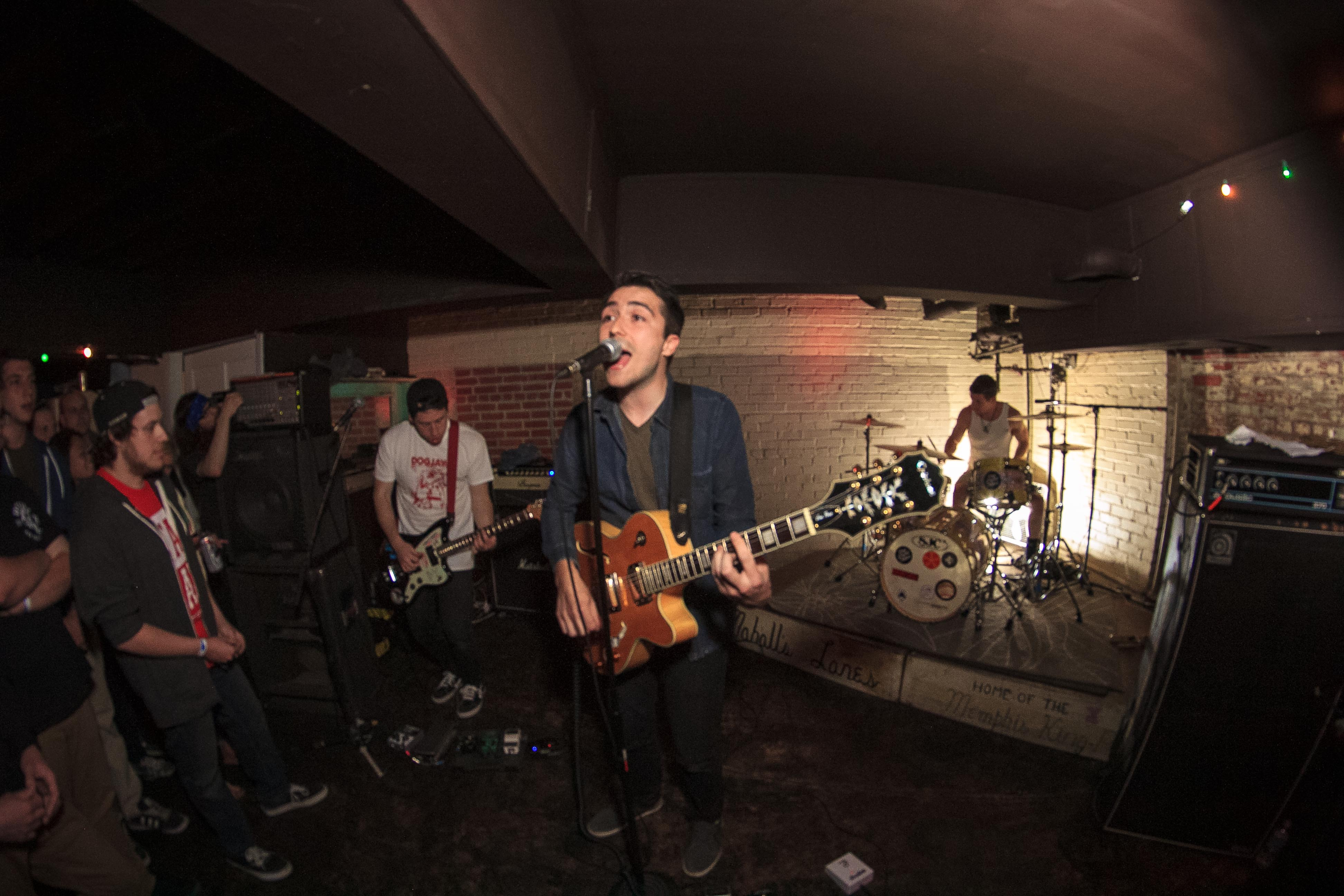

Background information
- Origin: Baltimore, Maryland, U.S.
- Genres: Alternative rock, indie rock, power pop, punk rock
- Years active: 2010–2015
- Labels: Photobooth, Topshelf
- Spinoffs: Turnstile, Angel Dust
- Spinoff of: Trapped Under Ice
- Past members: Justin Gilman; Sam Trapkin; Daniel Fang; Brendan Yates
- Website: dmnd.bandcamp.com

Diamond Youth was an American alternative rock band from Baltimore, Maryland, with members from Chicago, Illinois and Richmond, Virginia.

== History ==
Diamond Youth began in 2010, under the name Diamond, with the release of a 7" on Photobooth Records titled DMND. In 2011, Diamond Youth released an EP titled Don't Lose Your Cool on Alliance Trax and Fita Records. In December, the band supported Four Year Strong on their brief holiday tour dubbed It's a Wonderful Gig Life.

In 2013, Diamond Youth released their third EP titled Orange on Topshelf Records. In March, they embarked on a two-week tour with Turnover and PJ Bond. In November and December, the band went on tour with Citizen, Polar Bear Club and Sainthood Reps. In February 2014, Diamond Youth released their fourth EP titled Shake on Topshelf Records. In April, the group supported I Am the Avalanche on their headlining US tour. In July, the group embarked on a UK tour with Citizen and Headroom.

In March 2015, Diamond Youth announced plans to release a full-length album. On May 19, 2015, Diamond Youth released their first full-length album titled Nothing Matters on Topshelf Records. They split later that year, with Fang and Yates moving on to play in Turnstile.

In 2015, Justin Gilman formed a new project, Palladino, who toured Europe with Turnover in 2017.

In summer 2024, Justin Gilman formed an alt-doom project called We Read Minds who has released two singles, with talks of a full length and live performances on the way.

== Band members ==
- Justin Gilman – vocals, guitar (2010–2015)
- Sam Trapkin – guitar (2010–2015)
- Daniel Fang – bass (2010–2015)
- Brendan Yates – drums (2010–2015)
- Ian Hurdle – drums (2015)
- Grayson Wallace – bass (2015)

== Discography ==
Studio albums

- Nothing Matters (2015, Topshelf)

EPs

- DMND (2010, Photobooth)
- Don't Lose Your Cool (2011, Alliance Trax + Fita)
- Orange (2013, Topshelf)
- Shake (2014, Topshelf)

Singles

- "Nothing Matters" (2015)
