= Mystery (Turnstile song) =

Single by Turnstile

from the album Glow On
- Released: May 26, 2021
- Genre: Melodic hardcore; alternative rock; shoegaze
- Length: 2:45
- Label: Roadrunner
- Songwriters: Brendan Yates; Franz Lyons; Daniel Fang; Brady Ebert; Pat McCrory
- Producer: Mike Elizondo

Turnstile singles chronology
"I Don't Wanna Be Blind" (2018)	"Mystery" (2021)	"Alien Love Call" (2021)

Music video
- "Mystery" on YouTube

"Mystery" (stylized in all uppercase) is a song by American post-hardcore band Turnstile. The song is the lead single off of their third album, Glow On and was released on May 26, 2021. Reaching number eight in the Billboard Alternative Airplay charts and sixteen in the Billboard Mainstream Rock charts, it is the first single by the band to chart.

== Accolades ==
A "—" denotes the publication's list is in no particular order, and "Mystery" did not rank numerically.

Publication	Country	Accolade	Rank	Ref.
Fader	US	The 20 best rock songs right now	18	
Loudwire	US	The Best Rock Songs of 2021 (So Far)	—	
Pitchfork	US	The 100 Best Songs of 2021	68	

== Charts ==
Chart (2022)	Peak position
US Alternative Airplay (Billboard)	8
US Mainstream Rock (Billboard)	16

== Release history ==
Release dates and formats for "Mystery"
Region	Date	Format(s)	Label(s)	Ref.
United States	February 8, 2022	Alternative radio	Roadrunner	
