= Febuary (band) =

American screamo band

- Origin: Las Vegas, Nevada, U.S.
- Genres: Screamo
- Years active: 2023–2024; 2024–present
- Labels: Zegema Beach; Milk Crate
- Members: Rila Ogawa; Abby Walker; Airon Gauuf; Italy Jones
- Past members: Steph Webb; Dylan Samuel

Febuary is an American screamo band from Las Vegas, Nevada. They are one of the forefront and most commercially successful bands in the 2020s wave of the screamo genre, being amongst the first bands in the genre to play the major festival Coachella. They have released a full-length album and an EP.

Formed in 2023, their founding lineup consisted of Rila Ogawa (guitar, vocals), Steph Webb (bass, vocals) and Abby Walker (drums). After their first show, they were additionally joined by Airon Gauuf (guitar, vocals). They released their debut album February in 2024. Following its release, Steph Webb departed, replaced by Dylan Samuel. Within months, they had disbanded. Febuary reunited at the end of 2024, rejoined by Webb. They released the EP Run Like a Girl in 2025, after which Webb departed again, replaced by Italy Jones.

== History ==
Febuary was formed in 2023 in Las Vegas by Rila Ogawa (guitar, vocals), Steph Webb (bass, vocals) and Abby Walker (drums). Webb coined the name "Febuary" because her birthday was in February and, when pronouncing the month, she does not enunciate its first R. At their first show, their friend Airon Gauuf was impressed by their music and asked to join. He became an additional guitarist and vocalist.

They released their debut album February on April 20, 2024. In the following months, they undertook various support slots on tours across the United States. By April 29, Webb had departed from the group, replaced by Dylan Samuel. By August, they had disbanded. During this time, they began to gain significant attention through videos posted on the app TikTok.

By July 2025, Febuary had reunited, releasing the EP Run Like A Girl on July 6, 2025. One this EP, they were rejoined by Webb, however soon she departed from the band again. That month, Webb accused Febuary on social media of kicking her out for "not being emo enough". She alleged she wrote the song "I Hope Everyone Remembers What You Were", which was included on Run Like A Girl, however the remaining members had changed the lyrics to be a diss track against her. She released her original version of the song on Soundcloud, under the name "I hope everyone knows what I was too." The band responded with a statement alleging that Webb had wanted to change from bassist to guitarist, and the other members had disagreed. They also stated that the "not being emo enough" claim was a misquote, and instead a reference to how, following their disbandment, Webb had claimed she never liked screamo. Bass duties were subsequently taken on by Italy Jones.

On October 31, 2025, Ogawa was featured on the song "Dead Stars" by In Loving Memory. Between March 12 and 15, 2026, they toured the U.S. supporting Angel Dust. They performed at Coachella in April 2026. They will perform at Outbreak Festival in June 2026. Between October 7 and November 13, they will tour North America supporting Basement, alongside Momma, High Vis, Big Boy and First Day Back.

== Musical style ==
Critics have categorised Febuary's music as screamo. They incorporate elements of post-rock and sometimes sass.

Their music is raw and has a depressive mood. They make use of two lead vocalists, using both screamed vocals and spoken word. Their songs are based around dynamics, contrasting melancholic soft sections with whispered vocals against loud sections. They merge screamo instrumental sections with ones that are slower, brooding and post-rock-inspired. Their recordings often include parts generally cut out of conventional recordings, such as heavy breathing and guitar pickup buzz. Some songs include blast beats. Idioteq writer Karol Kamiński said their music "channels urgency, pain, and resilience into every second — a raw portrait of defiance and identity in a scene still crawling out of its boy-club past"

They have cited influences including Suis La Lune, Lazarus Plot, Foxtails, I Hate Sex, Crochet, Mineral, Tiny Moving Parts, second-wave emo and hardcore punk.

Febuary are a part of the "thriving" 2020s wave of screamo, being one of its forefront acts and amongst its most commercially successful. They were one of the first screamo band to play Coachella. Stereogum writer Danielle Chelosky called their song "No Way..." an "instant emo classic" and credited their 2025 EP Run Like A Girl wuith establishing summer 2025 as "Screamo summer". That year, Brooklyn Vegan editor Andrew Sacher called them "one of the most exciting new screamo bands".

== Members ==
Current

- Rila Ogawa – guitar, vocals (2023–2024; 2024–present)
- Abby Walker – drums (2023–2024; 2024–present)
- Airon Gauuf – guitar, vocals (2023–2024; 2024–present)
- Italy Jones – bass (2025–present)

Former

- Steph Webb – bass, vocals (2023–2024; 2024–2025)
- Dylan Samuel – bass (2024)

== Discography ==
Albums

- February (2024)

EPs

- Run Like a Girl (2025)
