= Glow On =

2021 album by Turnstile

Studio album by Turnstile
- Released: August 27, 2021
- Recorded: July–August 2020
- Studio: Phantom Studios (Gallatin, Tennessee)
- Genres: Hardcore punk; melodic hardcore; alternative rock
- Length: 34:51
- Label: Roadrunner
- Producer: Mike Elizondo

Turnstile chronology
Turnstile Love Connection (2021)	Glow On (2021)	New Heart Designs (2023)

Turnstile studio chronology
Time & Space (2018)	Glow On (2021)	Never Enough (2025)

Singles from Glow On
- 1. "Mystery" Released: May 26, 2021; 2. "Alien Love Call" Released: July 14, 2021; 3. "Blackout" Released: July 28, 2021; 4. "Fly Again" Released: August 11, 2021; 5. "Holiday" Released: 2022

Glow On (stylized in all caps) is the third studio album by the American rock band Turnstile, released on August 27, 2021, via Roadrunner Records. It is the band's last album to feature founding guitarist Brady Ebert, who departed from the band in August 2022.

The album was recorded in summer 2020 at Phantom Studios in Gallatin, Tennessee. It was recorded by American producer Mike Elizondo, and marks as the band's first release to include a featured artist with a guest appearance from British singer/songwriter and producer Blood Orange.

Glow On was preceded by the band's fifth EP, Turnstile Love Connection, released June 27, 2021, which previewed four songs (including lead single, "Mystery") from the album set to an accompanying short film directed by frontman and lead vocalist, Yates. The follow-up singles, "Alien Love Call" featuring Blood Orange, "Blackout" and "Fly Again" were released July and August 2021 respectively.

Glow On sold 15,600 album-equivalent units in its first week to debut at number 30 on the US Billboard 200, becoming the band's first album to chart there, and was praised by music critics, and named the best album of 2021 by Spin and the Pittsburgh Post-Gazette. Tracks "Holiday" and "Blackout" earned nominations at the 65th Grammy Awards.

== Composition ==
Glow On has been praised for making hardcore "genre-fluid" and showing "just how innovative [the genre] could become". PopMatters writer Ethan Stewart credited the album as being at the forefront of a wave of 2020s hardcore bands that built upon the 1990s alternative metal-meets-New York-style hardcore style of Snapcase or Crown of Thornz, but additionally incorporated experimental influences such as pop and funk music. Metal Hammer credited the album as expanding 1990s melodic hardcore. To balance out the hardcore sounds, they also dig into "melodic" alt-rock songs. Alternative pop, grunge, indie rock, post-punk, psychedelia, rap rock, R&B, shoegaze and soul sounds also appear throughout. Chris Richards of The Washington Post noted that the album's sound could be compared to that of Jane's Addiction.

Glow On is also noted for its "cleanly-produced" takes on pop music. A "newly-polished" dream pop style shows as well, yielding a sound for the album that is cast in "overt hues of pink".

"Don't Play" mixes samba into punk rock while "No Surprise" is "hazy" emo pop. With its drums, cowbells and layered handclaps, "Dance-Off" journeys into "heavy" funk.

== Critical reception ==
Professional ratings
Aggregate scores
Source	Rating
AnyDecentMusic?	8.5/10
Metacritic	92/100
Review scores
Source	Rating
AllMusic	4.5/5 stars
Clash	8/10
Consequence	A+
DIY	5/5 stars
Exclaim!	9/10
Kerrang!	5/5
The Line of Best Fit	9/10
NME	5/5 stars
Paste	8.4/10
Pitchfork	8.4/10

Glow On received praise from music critics. On Metacritic, it holds a score of 92 out of 100, based on thirteen reviews.

Laviea Thomas for Clash called it "a riveting return" for the quintet. Australian Guitar Magazine called the album "a true masterclass in the art of heavy music", with writer Matt Doria adding, "the sheer depth and dynamism of its musicality cannot be understated, nor Turnstile’s passion in sculpting it". Paste referred to its appeal, writing, "GLOW ON isn’t just one of the best hardcore albums of the year; it’s one of the best albums of the year in general." Reviewing the album for AllMusic, James Christopher Monger described it as both "vital and respective" and claimed it to be "a violent, late-summer storm" that "pummels the power grid but mercifully leaves the lights on".

== Accolades ==
=== Year-end lists ===
A "—" denotes the publication's list is in no particular order, and Glow On did not rank numerically.

Publication	Country	Accolade	Rank	Ref.
AllMusic	US	AllMusic Best of 2021	—	
BBC	UK	The 21 Best Albums of 2021	21	
Billboard	US	The 50 Best Albums of 2021: Staff List	27	
Consequence	US	Top 50 Albums of 2021	4	
Consequence	US	Top 30 Metal and Hard Rock Albums of 2021	3	
Crack Magazine	UK	The Top 50 Albums of the Year	17	
The Economist	UK	The best albums of 2021	—	
Esquire	US	The Best Albums of 2021	—	
Exclaim!	CA	Exclaim!'s 50 Best Albums of 2021	17	
The Fader	US	The 50 best albums of 2021	14	
The Guardian	UK	The 50 best albums of 2021	18	
Les Inrockuptibles	FR	Carole Boinet's Top 10 Albums of 2021	10	
Les Inrockuptibles	FR	Cyril Camu's Top 10 Albums of 2021	2	
Les Inrockuptibles	FR	Théo Dubreuil's Top 10 Albums of 2021	2	
Kerrang!	UK	The 50 best albums of 2021	4	
Loudwire	US	The 45 Best Rock + Metal Albums of 2021	3	
Loudwire	US	The Best Hard Rock Album of Each Year Since 1970	1	
Men's Health	US	The 15 Best Albums of 2021	3	
NME	UK	The 50 best albums of 2021	9	
NPR	US	The 50 Best Albums of 2021	24	
Paste	US	The 50 Best Albums of 2021	2	
Pitchfork	US	The 50 Best Albums of 2021	6	
Pitchfork	US	The 31 Best Rock Albums of 2021	—	
Pittsburgh Post-Gazette	US	The 10 best albums of 2021	1	
PopMatters	US	The 75 Best Albums of 2021	56	
The Quietus	UK	Quietus Albums Of The Year 2021	93	
Revolver	US	25 Best Albums of 2021	3	
The Ringer	US	The Best Albums of 2021	3	
Rolling Stone	US	The 50 Best Albums of 2021	8	
Spin	US	The 30 Best Albums of 2021	1	
Uproxx	US	The Best Albums Of 2021	—	
The Washington Post	US	Best music of 2021	4	

== Track listing ==
All tracks are written by Turnstile, except where noted.

No.	Title	Writer(s)	Length
1.	"Mystery"		2:35
2.	"Blackout"		2:53
3.	"Don't Play"		2:13
4.	"Underwater Boi"	Turnstile; Justice Tripp	3:04
5.	"Holiday"		2:52
6.	"Humanoid / Shake It Up"		1:09
7.	"Endless"	Turnstile; Sam Trapkin	1:58
8.	"Fly Again"		2:31
9.	"Alien Love Call" (featuring Blood Orange)	Turnstile; Devonté Hynes	2:56
10.	"Wild Wrld"		2:54
11.	"Dance-Off"		2:09
12.	"New Heart Design"		2:27
13.	"T.L.C. (Turnstile Love Connection)"		1:42
14.	"No Surprise"		0:45
15.	"Lonely Dezires" (featuring Blood Orange)		2:43
Total length:			34:51

Notes

- All tracks are stylized in all caps.

== Personnel ==
Credits adapted from the liner notes of Glow On and Tidal.

Turnstile

- Brendan Yates – vocals (tracks 1–13, 15), co-production (all tracks), art direction
- Franz Lyons – bass (all tracks), vocals (tracks 6, 14)
- Brady Ebert – guitar (all tracks)
- Pat McCrory – guitar (all tracks)
- Daniel Fang – drums (tracks 1–13, 15)

Additional personnel

- Dev Hynes – vocals (tracks 9, 15), additional vocals (track 7)
- Julien Baker – additional vocals (track 4)
- Mike Elizondo – production (all tracks), drum programming (1–7, 10–13) synthesizer (tracks 1, 9–15)
- Adam Hawkins – mixing (all tracks)
- Lawson White – engineering (all tracks)
- Erica Block – assistant engineering (all tracks)
- Zachary Stokes – assistant engineering (all tracks)
- Chris Gehringer – mastering
- Alexis Jamet – cover, design
- Dewey Saunders – art direction
- Jimmy Fontaine – band photos

== Charts ==
Chart performance for Glow On
Chart (2021–2026)	Peak position
Australian Albums (ARIA)	82
Austrian Albums (Ö3 Austria)	75
Belgian Albums (Ultratop Flanders)	93
Belgian Albums (Ultratop Wallonia)	108
German Albums (Offizielle Top 100)	9
Hungarian Albums (MAHASZ)	25
Portuguese Albums (AFP)	167
Scottish Albums (Official Charts)	22
Spanish Albums (Promusicae)	98
Swiss Albums (Schweizer Hitparade)	30
UK Albums (Official Charts)	62
UK Rock & Metal Albums (Official Charts)	2
US Billboard 200	30
