= Blackout (Turnstile song) =

Single by Turnstile

from the album Glow On
- Released: July 28, 2021
- Genre: Melodic hardcore; hardcore punk; alternative rock
- Length: 2:53
- Label: Roadrunner
- Songwriters: Brendan Yates; Franz Lyons; Daniel Fang; Brady Ebert; Pat McCrory
- Producer: Mike Elizondo

Turnstile singles chronology
| "Alien Love Call" (2021) | "Blackout" (2021) | "Fly Again" (2021) |

Music video
- "Blackout" on YouTube

"Blackout" (stylized in all uppercase) is a song by American post-hardcore band Turnstile. The song is the third single off of their third album, Glow On and was released on July 28, 2021. The song charted on both the Mainstream Rock and Hot Hard Rock Songs charts.

== Composition ==
The song has been described as a mixture of melodic hardcore and hardcore punk, with elements of the song reminiscent of bands like Bad Brains and Snapcase.

== Release and promotion ==
=== Music video ===
The music video for "Blackout" came out on July 28, 2021 on YouTube. The animated music video for "Blackout" was self-directed by Turnstile, with animation led by Alexis Jamet and Logan Triplett. The visual aesthetic relies on stark, monochrome imagery, featuring static-animated silhouettes of the band performing in a surreal, glitch-inspired environment. Original art assets were created by Alexis Jamet and Juan Carreras, while creative direction was overseen by Turnstile vocalist Brendan Yates and collaborator Anthony Miralles. Its minimalist yet kinetic style mirrors the song’s frenetic energy, blending hardcore punk rawness with abstract, almost hallucinatory visuals.

== Critical reception ==
"Blackout" became one of Turnstile’s most acclaimed songs, praised for its genre-blurring energy and helping solidify Glow On as a breakthrough album in alternative and hardcore music. The song was the second single, after "Mystery" to chart and the track gained significant traction through streaming and live performances, becoming a fan favorite and a staple of the band’s setlists.

The song was widely celebrated by critics, with Pitchfork naming it "a hardcore anthem with an undeniable groove" and ranking it among the best tracks of 2021. Kerrang! called it "outrageously fun," while Rolling Stone highlighted its "infectious rhythm and anthemic chorus" as key to Glow On’s crossover appeal.

== Chart performance ==
"Blackout" became Turnstile's second ever song to chart, reaching number 22 in the Billboard Hot Hard Rock Songs and number 35 in the Billboard Mainstream Rock chart. Furthermore the song became a streaming hit, accumulating millions of plays on both Spotify, Apple Music and YouTube.

== Charts ==
| Chart (2021) | Peak position |
|---|---|
| US Hot Hard Rock Songs (Billboard) | 22 |
| US Mainstream Rock (Billboard) | 35 |
