= Angel Dust (American band) =

American rock band

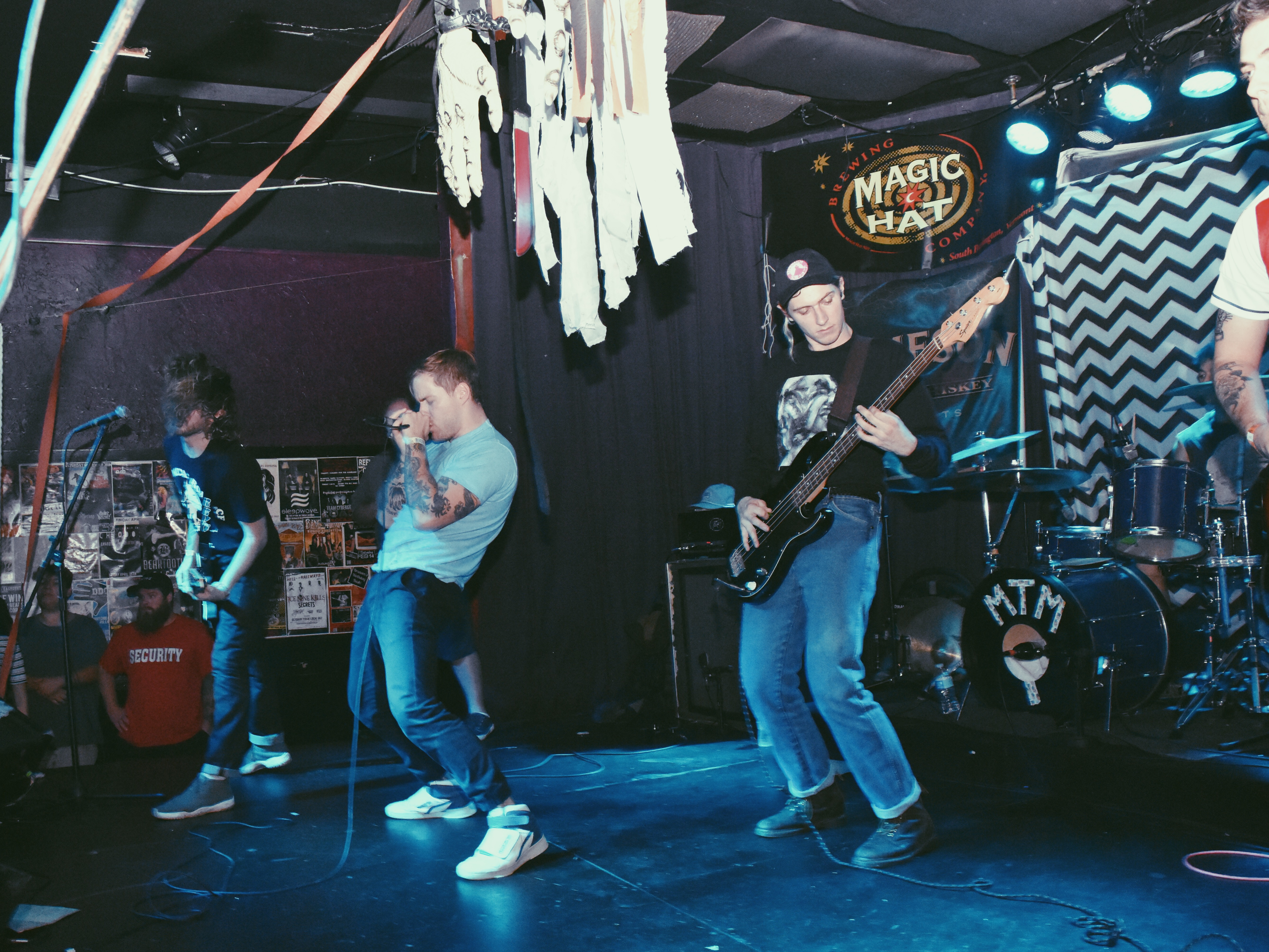
- Angel Dust in 2016

Background information
- Origin: Baltimore, Maryland, U.S.
- Genres: Pop rock; hardcore punk; melodic hardcore; punk rock (early)
- Years active: 2013–present
- Labels: Reaper, Clay Pasternack, Flatspot, Pop Wig, Run for Cover, Roadrunner
- Spinoff of: Turnstile, Trapped Under Ice, Diamond Youth
- Members: Justice Tripp; Steve Marino; Zechariah Ghosttribe; Jim Carroll; Nick Lewis
- Past members: Jeff Caffey; Zach Roloff; Michael Quick; Daniel Fang; Brendan Yates; Pat McCrory; Tommy Cantwell; Daniel Star

Angel Dust (stylized as Angel Du$t) is an American rock group formed in Baltimore, Maryland in 2013. Originally made up of members of Turnstile and Trapped Under Ice, the band has undergone multiple line-up changes, with lead vocalist Justice Tripp being the band's sole constant member. Alongside Tripp, the band currently includes Steve Marino (rhythm guitar, backing vocals), Jim Carroll (lead guitar), Zechariah Ghostribe (bass) and Nick Lewis (drums).

The band has released six studio albums to date, with their most recent, COLD 2 THE TOUCH, released in February 2026. The band were previously signed to Roadrunner Records between 2018 and 2025; they are currently signed to Run for Cover Records. In 2019, Billboard noted them as one of the most important bands in broadening the scope of what hardcore punk is. Kerrang! included their 2019 album Pretty Buff as one of their "25 Best Albums of 2019" and Loudwire named it one of the 50 best metal albums of 2019.

== History ==
=== 2013–2016: early years, A.D., and Rock the Fuck on Forever ===
Angel Du$t was formed in 2013 by vocalist/songwriter Justice Tripp of Trapped Under Ice, guitarist Michael Quick, bassist Nicholas Heitman, drummer Daniel Fang of Turnstile, and guitarist Pat McCrory — who would also later go on to join Turnstile. The band released their demo Xtra Raw on April 8, 2013, via React! Records. In September/October 2013, the band supported Twitching Tongues on their On Tour There Is No Law US tour alongside Downpresser and select support from Turnstile and Stigmata.

In February 2014, the band supported Turnstile on their US headlining tour alongside Diamond Youth, Turnover, and Blind Justice. On June 10, 2014, the band released their debut album A.D. via React! and Reaper Records. Quick would depart the band the following year, converting the band into a four-piece. On May 20, 2016, the band released their second album Rock the Fuck on Forever via Pop Wig Records — an independent label owned by Tripp, Fang, and Brendan Yates. In October and November 2016, the band supported Turnstile on their Move Thru Me tour in the US alongside Big Bite and select support from Krimewatch, Fury, and Lock.

=== 2017–2020: Pretty Buff ===
In 2017, the band saw the departure of founding bassist Nicholas Heitman. He was replaced by Odd Man Out's Jeff Caffey. That same year, Yates joined the band as their new rhythm guitarist. On March 15, 2019, the band released their third album Pretty Buff via Roadrunner Records. This album brought a large stylistic change, shifting away from hardcore/punk music and more towards acoustic power pop, inspired by bands such as The Lemonheads. Most of the lyrical content was written about the passing of Tripp's dog, Spike. in June 2019, the band embarked on the second US leg of the Pretty Buff tour with support from Gouge Away and Glitterer. In 2020, the band released the EP Lil House, which featured songs that would later appear on the band's fourth album.

=== 2021–2024: Yak and Brand New Soul ===
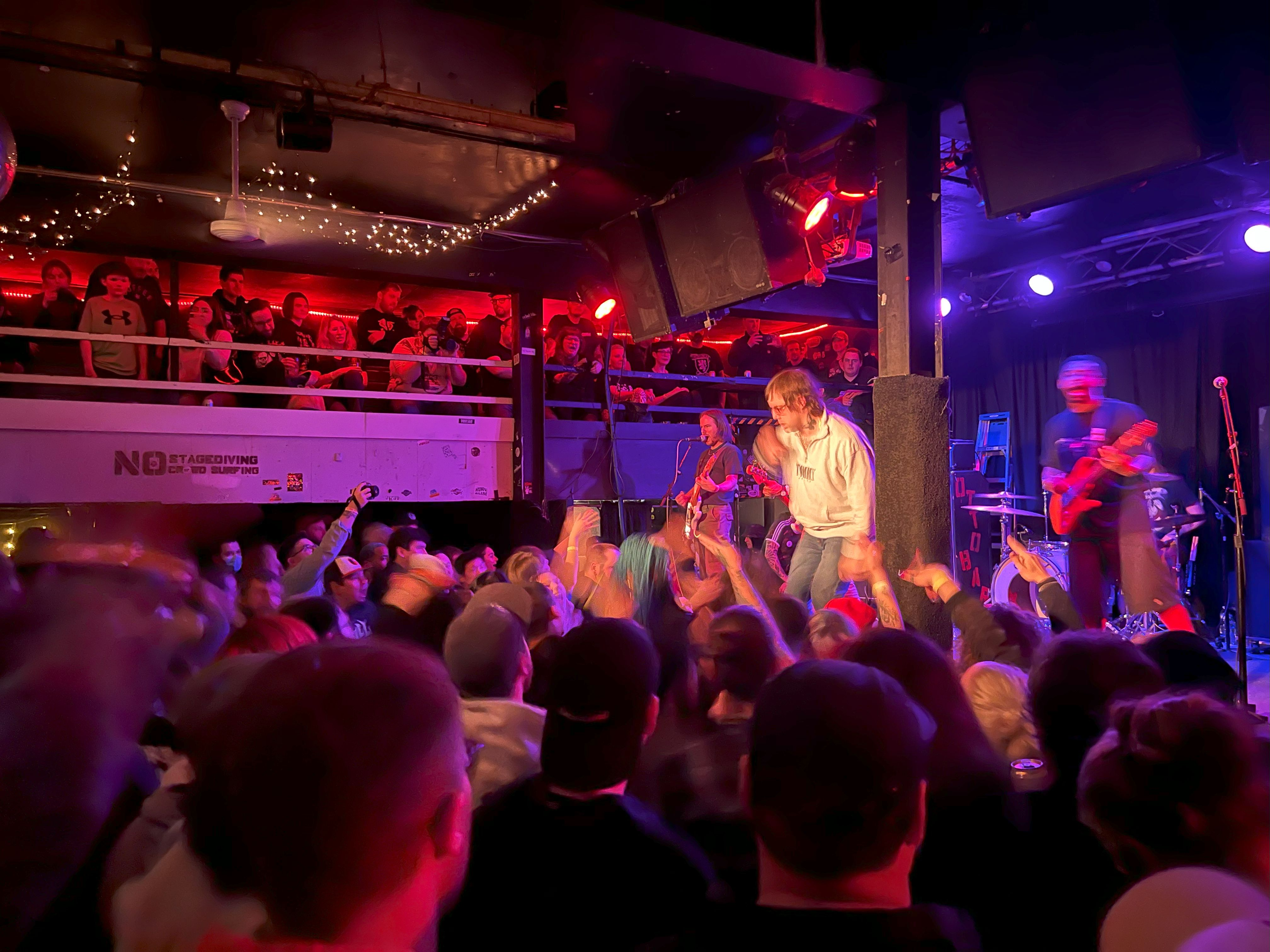
Angel Dust performing at the Ottobar in Baltimore, 2023

In September 2021, the band supported Mannequin Pussy on their US tour alongside Pinkshift. The following month, on October 22, the band released their fourth album Yak: A Collection of Truck Songs via Roadrunner Records. The album included the song "Dancing on the Radio", which featured Tim Armstrong of Rancid — marking the band's first ever track to include a listed feature. The album marked the band's final release with Yates, who departed from the band to focus on Turnstile.

The band toured extensively throughout 2022. This included support slots for PUP on their Thank Fucking God US tour and Movements on their debut US tour, as well as a co-headlining UK tour with Drug Church. The band continued to tour with Drug Church into 2023, with a North American tour alongside Fiddlehead taking place in February.

In May 2023, the band shared two new songs: "Very Aggressive", featuring Mat Kerekes of Citizen, and "Love Slam". In July, the band shared details of their fifth studio album Brand New Soul, as well as sharing a new single titled "Space Jam". With the album's announcement came Tripp officially launching a new line-up of the band, including several new members that had previously served as touring substitutes while McCrory, Fang and Yates were busy with Turnstile: rhythm guitarist Steve Marino, bassist Zechariah Ghosttribe, drummer Tommy Cantwell and lead guitarist Daniel Star. In a new interview with Stereogum, Tripp confirmed that while both Fang and McCrory had made some contributions to the album and were still involved with the band to a degree, they too had largely shifted out of the Angel Dust camp in order to focus full-time on Turnstile.

=== 2025–present: Cold 2 The Touch ===
In 2025, the band announced its signing to Run For Cover Records with the release of a double A-side single, "The Beat" and "The Knife". Two new members also joined at this time: guitarist Jim Carroll — also of American Nightmare and The Hope Conspiracy — and drummer Nick Lewis. They later announced their sixth studio album Cold 2 The Touch, which was released on February 13, 2026.

== Musical style ==
The band has been categorised as soft rock, pop rock, hardcore punk and melodic hardcore. Their music often incorporates elements of surf rock, grunge, alternative rock and pop.

Their 2013 demo Xtra Raw was described by Kerrang! as a "scrappy, lo-fi bundle of punk", while their subsequent material was more melodic. Revolver magazine described the band's music as a "curve ball", due to its relationship to the hardcore scene, despite also including "heartfelt saxophone", "strummy acoustic guitar[s]" and "an overwhelming amount of positivity", and in another article as "about as catchy and fun as catchy and fun get". In an article for Clash, writer Robin Murray described their music as "between a rough-around-the-edges Lemonheads with Elvis Costello vocal melodies".

Many of the tracks on the band's 2019 album Pretty Buff were written about the death of Tripp's dog.

They cited influences including the Lemonheads, the Replacements, the Feelies, Bad Brains, Violent Femmes and Greg Sage. Vocalist Justice Tripp has cited his main influences as James Ismean of Fury of Five and Iggy Pop of the Stooges.

== Members ==
Current members

- Justice Tripp – lead vocals (2013–present), acoustic guitar (2019–2023)
- Steve Marino – rhythm guitar, backing vocals (2023–present), bass (2021–2023, touring)
- Zechariah Ghostribe – bass (2023–present)
- Jim Carroll – lead guitar (2025–present; touring 2024–2025)
- Nick Lewis – drums (2025–present; touring 2024–2025)

Former members

- Michael "Cheddar" Quick – rhythm guitar (2013–2015)
- Brendan Yates – rhythm guitar, backing vocals (2017–2021)
- Pat McCrory – lead guitar, backing vocals (2013–2023)
- Daniel Star – lead guitar, backing vocals (2023–2025)
- Nicholas Heitman – bass (2013–2017)
- Jeff Caffey – bass (2017–2020)
- Daniel Fang – drums, percussion (2013–2023)
- Tommy Cantwell – drums (2023–2025; touring 2022–2023)

Former touring musicians

- Kora Puckett – guitar (2021)
- Allen Trainer – drums (2021)
- Matthew Berry – bass (2016), rhythm guitar (2021)
- Taylor Madison – rhythm guitar (2022)

Timeline

== Discography ==
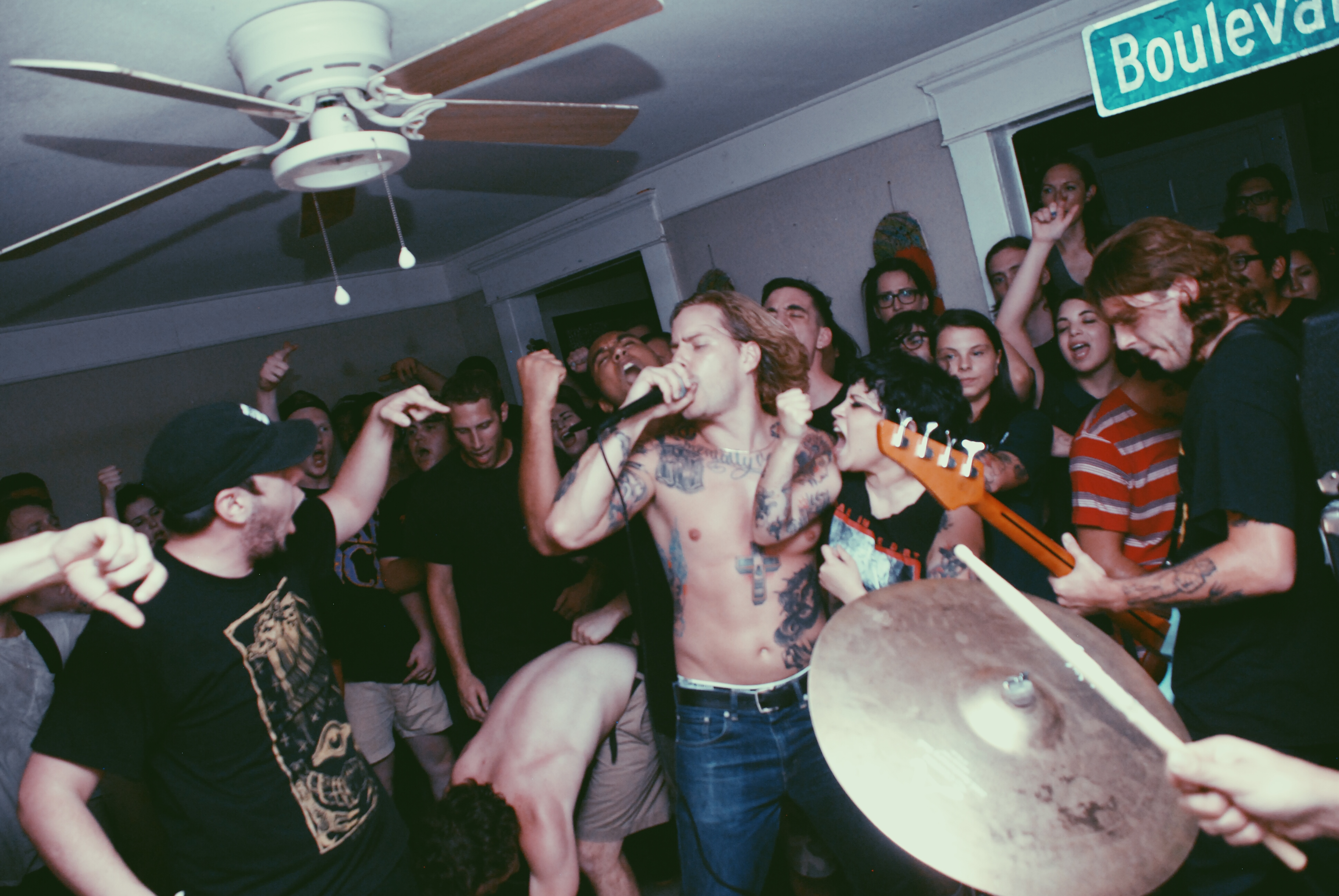
Angel Dust in 2014

Studio albums

Year	Album details
2014	A.D.: Released: 10 June 2014; Label: React! Records/Reaper Records; Formats: CD, digital download, 12" vinyl
2016	Rock the Fuck on Forever: Released: 20 May 2016; Label: Pop Wig Records; Formats: CD, digital download, 12" vinyl, streaming
2019	Pretty Buff: Released: 15 March 2019; Label: Roadrunner Records; Formats: CD, digital download, 12" vinyl, streaming
2021	YAK: A Collection of Truck Songs: Released 22 October 2021; Label: Roadrunner Records; Formats: CD, digital download, 12" vinyl, streaming
2023	Brand New Soul: Released: 9 September 2023; Label: Pop Wig Records; Formats: CD, digital download, 12" vinyl, streaming
2026	Cold 2 The Touch: Released: 13 February 2026; Label: Run for Cover; Formats: CD, digital download, 12" vinyl, streaming

EPs

- Lil House (2020)
- Bigger House (2021)

Demos

- Xtra Raw (2013)

== Accolades ==
Nominated work	Year	Award	Result
Angel Dust	2019	Kerrang! Awards - Best International Breakthrough Act	Nominated
