= Twitching Tongues =

American metal band

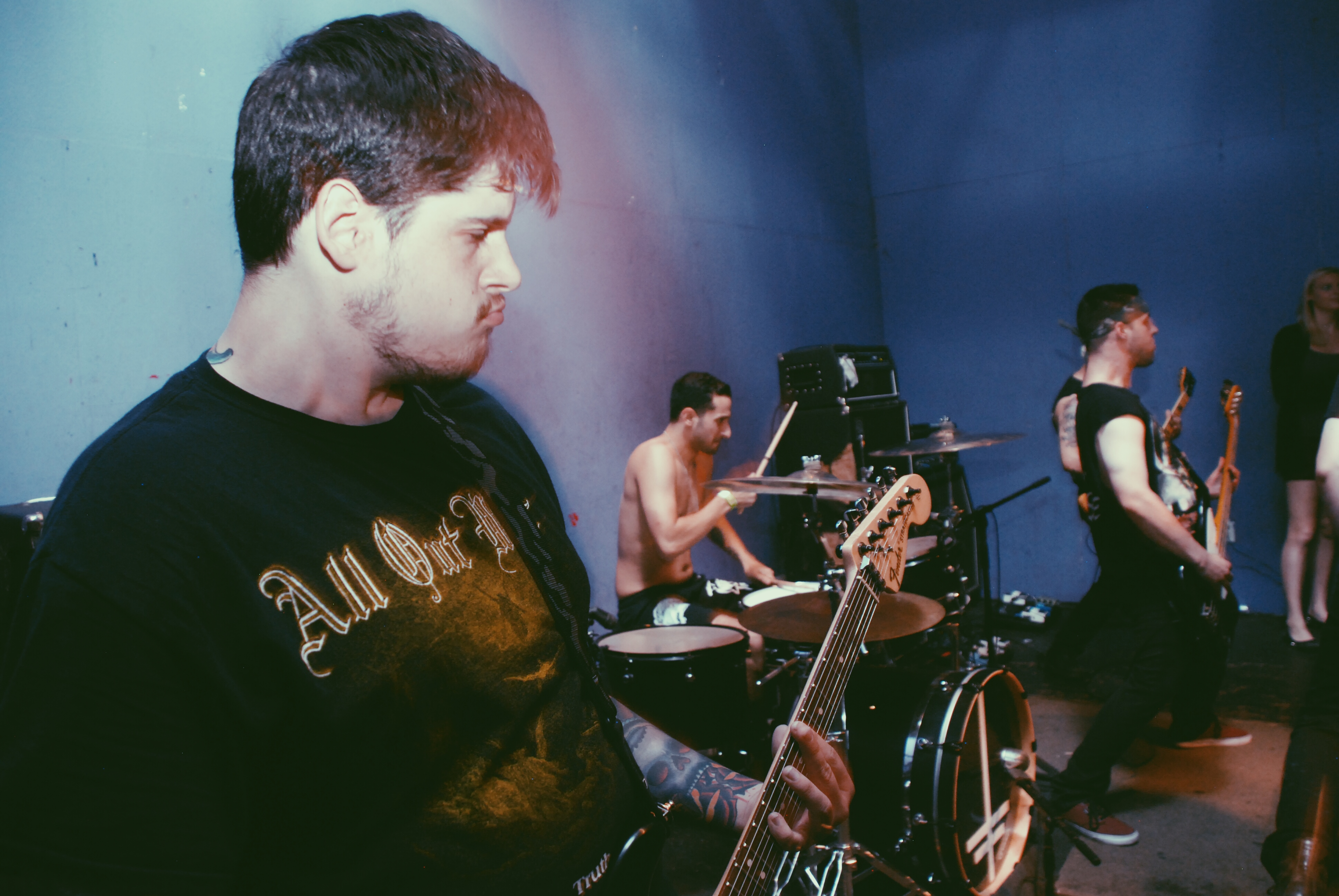
- Twitching Tongues performing in 2014

Background information
- Also known as: Twitchfits
- Origin: Los Angeles, California, U.S.
- Genres: Sludge metal; metalcore; groove metal
- Years active: 2009–present
- Labels: Closed Casket Activities; Metal Blade; I Scream
- Spinoffs: God's Hate
- Spinoff of: Ruckus
- Members: Colin Young; Taylor Young; Sean Martin; Alec Faber; Michael Cesario
- Past members: Cayle Sain; Anthonie Gonzalez; Lee Orozco; Kyle Thomas; Keith Paull
- Website: twitchingtongues.com

Twitching Tongues is an American heavy metal band from California, founded in 2009. The band has released four albums: Sleep Therapy in 2012, In Love There Is No Law in 2013, Disharmony in 2015, and Gaining Purpose Through Passionate Hatred in 2018. They have also released two EPs – 2011's I & I (Insane and Inhumane) and 2012's Preacher Man.

== History ==
The band was founded in Los Angeles in 2009 by brothers Colin and Taylor Young. In 2012, their first album, Sleep Therapy, was released, followed by In Love There Is No Law the next year. Their 2015 album, Disharmony, was positively reviewed by NPR's Lars Gotrich, who wrote that Twitching Tongues has "been particularly adept at the moody mosh." The album also received a favorable reception from Vice's John Hill, who opined that "hardcore is at its best when it takes risks", using the band's song "Asylum Avenue" as an example.

Twitching Tongues toured internationally after the release of their earliest pair of albums, sometimes alongside other metal bands such as Harm's Way. In a 2018 Revolver interview, frontman Colin Young said that Peter Steele had been a formative influence on his music and the band's work.

After being on hiatus for a couple of years, Twitching Tongues in April 2023 re-released a newly re-mixed and remastered version of their debut album, Sleep Therapy, and started playing live shows again.

For Halloween 2023, the band released an EP with Misfits cover songs called Twitchfits Vol.1, also playing a nine-song set of Misfits songs in San Fernando Valley on October 28. For the occasion the band was billed as Twitchfits.

Drummer Cayle Sain died in December 2023, at the age of 31. He was replaced by original drummer Mike Cesario.

The band released Twitchfits Vol. 2 on October 24, 2024; a 10-song album with Misfits covers.

On October 21, 2025 the band released Twitchfits Vol. 3; a 5-song Misfits cover EP. The release was again followed by an annual Halloween cover show at 1720 in Los Angeles, California. On November 8, 2025 the band joined Coheed And Cambria on the "S.S. Never Surrender" cruise; sailing from Miami, FL to Cozumel, Mexico and playing 3 shows on board over a span of 5 days.

== Musical style and influences ==
Critics rarely categorise Twitching Tongues' music under established music genres: New Noise magazine writer Sean Gonzalez stated that "Trying to confine Twitching Tongue's sound to a specific genre is like pulling your own teeth, it's hard and no one really enjoys the outcome", while Metal Injection stated that "Every stylistic shift that is seemingly laced through this web of genres shouts originality." In the cases where they have been categorised, critics have called them groove metal, metalcore and sludge metal. They incorporate elements of doom metal, hardcore punk, alternative metal, traditional heavy metal and gothic rock.

They have cited influences including Agents of Man, Sam Black Church, Type O Negative, Carnivore, Bolt Thrower, Candlemass, Merauder, Only Living Witness, Cave In, Crowbar and Coheed and Cambria.

== Members ==
Current

- Colin Young – vocals (2009–present)
- Taylor Young – guitar, vocals (2009–present)
- Michael Cesario – drums (2009–2015, 2023–present)
- Sean Martin – guitar (2015–present)
- Alec Faber – bass (2016–present)

Former

- Keith Paull – bass (2009–2012)
- Lee Orozco – guitar (2012–2015)
- Kyle Thomas – bass (2012–2015)
- Cayle Sain – drums (2015–2023; his death)
- Anthonie Gonzalez – bass (2015–2016)

Timeline

== Discography ==
=== Studio albums ===
- Sleep Therapy (2012, I Scream)
- In Love There Is No Law (2013, Closed Casket Activities)
- Disharmony (2015, Metal Blade)
- Gaining Purpose Through Passionate Hatred (2018, Metal Blade)

=== EPs ===
- I & I (Insane and Inhumane) (2011, Photobooth Records)
- Preacher Man (2012, Closed Casket Activities)
- Disharmony Zero (2018, Metal Blade)
- Twitchfits Vol. 1 (2023, Closed Casket Activities)
- Twitchfits Vol. 2 (2024, Closed Casket Activities)
- Twitchfits Vol. 3 (2025, Closed Casket Activities)
