= Justice Tripp =

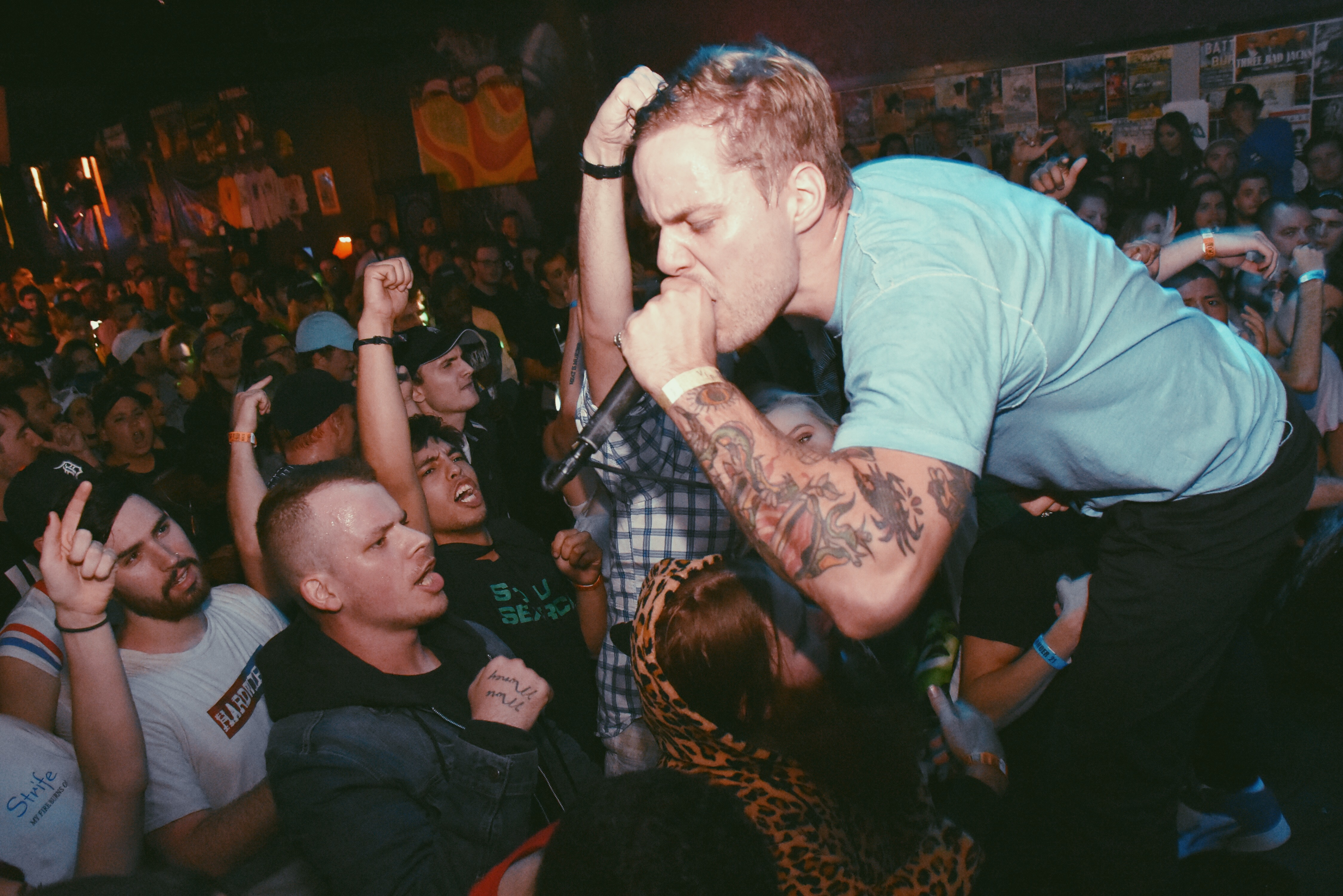
- Tripp performing live in 2016 with Angel Dust

Background information
- Also known as: Cold Mega; Jurtice
- Born: March 11, 1986 (age 40)
- Origin: Baltimore, Maryland, U.S.
- Genres: Hardcore punk; power pop; bedroom pop
- Instruments: Vocals, guitar
- Years active: 2004–present
- Label: Pop Wig
- Member of: Angel Dust; Trapped Under Ice; Warfare
- Formerly of: Nick Fury; Sai Nam

Justice Tripp (born March 11, 1986) is an American musician who is notably the vocalist of hardcore punk band Trapped Under Ice and rock band Angel Dust. He additionally performs solo bedroom pop under the stage name Cold Mega, plays guitar in Warfare and was previously vocalist of Sai Nam and guitarist in Nick Fury. He has featured on songs by notable groups including Pulling Teeth, Gideon and Pain of Truth, and is a co-founder of independent record label Pop Wig Records, which has released music by bands including Turnstile and Iron Reagan.

== Early life ==
Tripp was born on March 11, 1986 to first-generation Polish immigrants to the United States. He was raised in Essex, Maryland, by his single mother who worked as a hairdresser. His uncle and step father were both bikers, who introduced him to rock and roll and heavy metal at a young age, his uncle buying him his first guitar. Tripp was introduced to punk rock after his older brother gifted him a number of CDs that he had obtained while stealing a car. He formed his first band, in which he played guitar, at ten years old. He attended his first hardcore punk show at thirteen at Baltimore venue the Sidebar, where Hatebreed, Death Threat and Out To Win performed. Around 2004, Tripp began playing in youth crew band Nick Fury (or Nick X Fury), which around 2006 would feature future Trapped Under Ice guitarist Sam Trapkin. That year, Tripp and Trapkin began writing material for a Nick Fury which would never be released, and by that summer they began to form Trapped Under Ice.

== Career ==
=== Trapped Under Ice ===
Trapped Under Ice was formed in 2007 by Justice Tripp and Sam Trapkin on guitars, with Anton Rough on vocals. By the time of recording their demo tape later that year, the band's lineup had revolved to Justice Tripp on vocalist, Sam Trapkin and Daniel Klipa on guitars, Eric Mach on bass and Ben Esparanza on drums. The band re-popularised the tough guy hardcore aesthetic and beatdown hardcore sound by incorporated polished production, danceable rhythms, and more melodic and experimental aspects into the genre. The band's Chad Gilbert-produced second album Big Kiss Goodnight (2011) was one of the most influential hardcore albums of its time, with Stereogum writer Tom Breiham stating in a 2023 article that "it's been years since we've gotten a new Trapped Under Ice song, but that band's influence looms large over the entire hardcore landscape today." In 2013, the band announced they would disbanding following their set at This is Hardcore festival.

The band reformed in 2015, playing their first reunion show at Back To School Jam on September 12. The band released their third studio album Heatwave in 2017, which saw the band expand their sound to embrace some of the more unorthodox influences for hardcore that Tripp has been experimenting with as a part of Angel Dust.

=== Sai Nam ===
Sai Nam was a hardcore band formed in 2011 by guitarist Mike Dijan of 1980s New York hardcore band Breakdown and drummer Lou Medina of 1990s metalcore band All Out War. The pair reached out to producer Dean Baltulonis for advice on finding a vocalist, who, having recently worked with Trapped Under Ice, recommended Tripp. Medina and Dijan approached Tripp later that week when Trapped Under Ice headlined the Santos House Party venue in New York City. Tripp accepted and the trio soon entered Wild Arctic Recording Studio to record with Baltulonis producing. The band played its first live show in December 2011, supporting the Cro-Mags. Their sole album Crush was released in May 2012 through Reaper Records. Between March 8 and 10, 2013, they toured the United States supporting Incendiary

=== Angel Dust ===
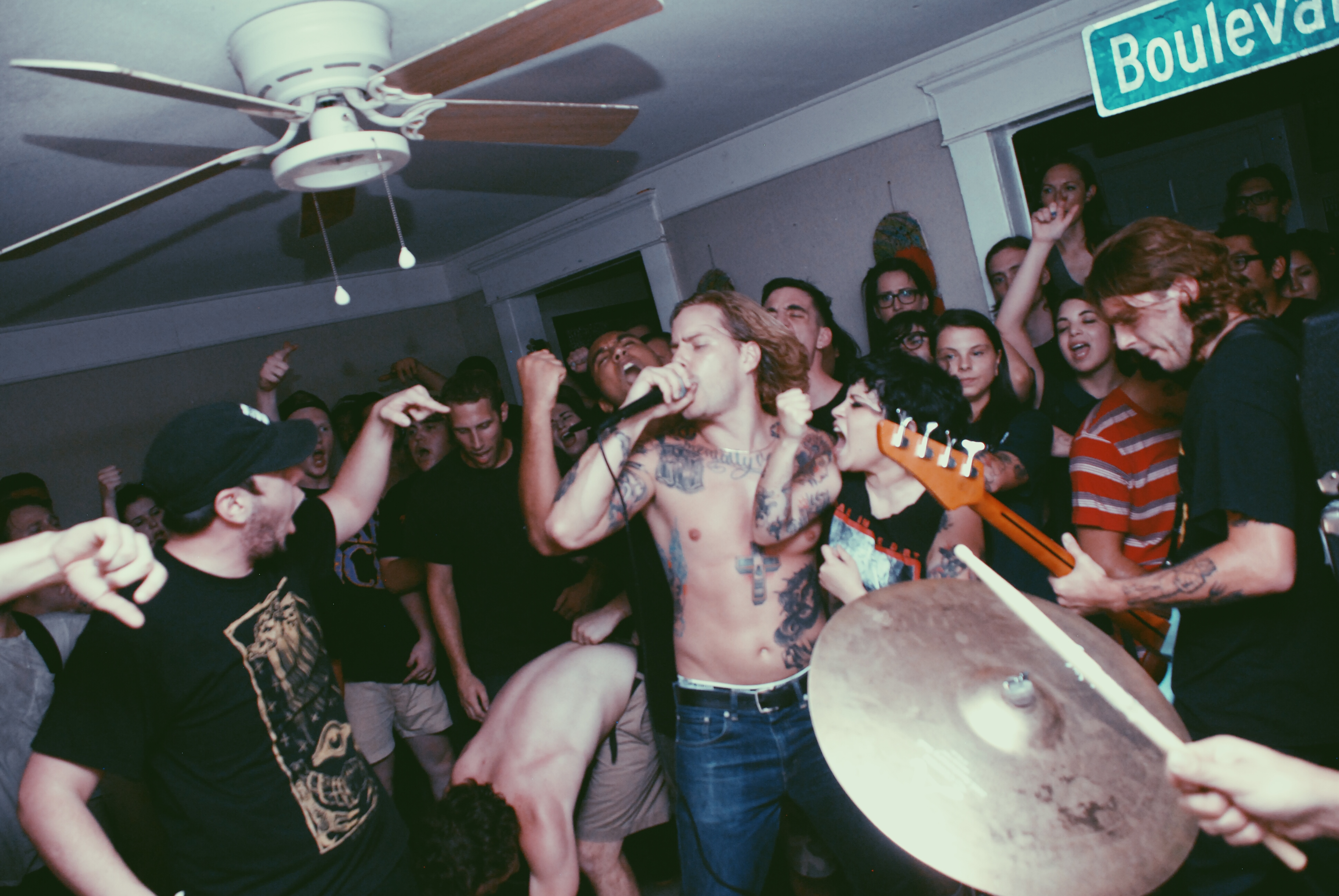
Tripp (center) performing live with Angel Dust in 2014

In 2013, as Trapped Under Ice were in the process of disbanding, Tripp began writing music with a less serious tone than his previous band. Tripp originally intended to only play guitar, with Nicholas Heitman taking on vocal duties. However, Heitman instead opted to play bass, and Tripp took on vocal duties. The first solidified lineup of the band was Tripp on vocals, Michael Quick and Pat McCrory on guitar, Nicholas Heitman on bass and Daniel Fang on drums. While Angel Dust's music is rooted in hardcore, it takes a more experimental approach, embracing influences from hip hop, funk and pop music, making it increasingly border power pop. Their debut album A.D. was released in 2014.

=== Warfare ===
Warfare was founding by Sam Yarmuth, owner of Triple B Records, and founding Trash Talk drummer Sam Bossom in 2016. The duo recorded their demo the same year in California with Madison Woodward of Fury engineering and playing bass. By the time the demo was released, Tripp had joined the band on guitar alongside Ryan Boone of Firewalker. The band's sound is primarily influenced by early, fast New York hardcore like Youth of Today, Warzone and the Abused. They released their Demo 2016 on January 27, 2016. The band's debut album Declaration was released on November 14, 2018. On November 16, 2021, they released a split EP with Boston hardcore band Restraining Order. Their second full-length album Doomsday was released on March 11, 2022.

=== Other projects and collaborations ===
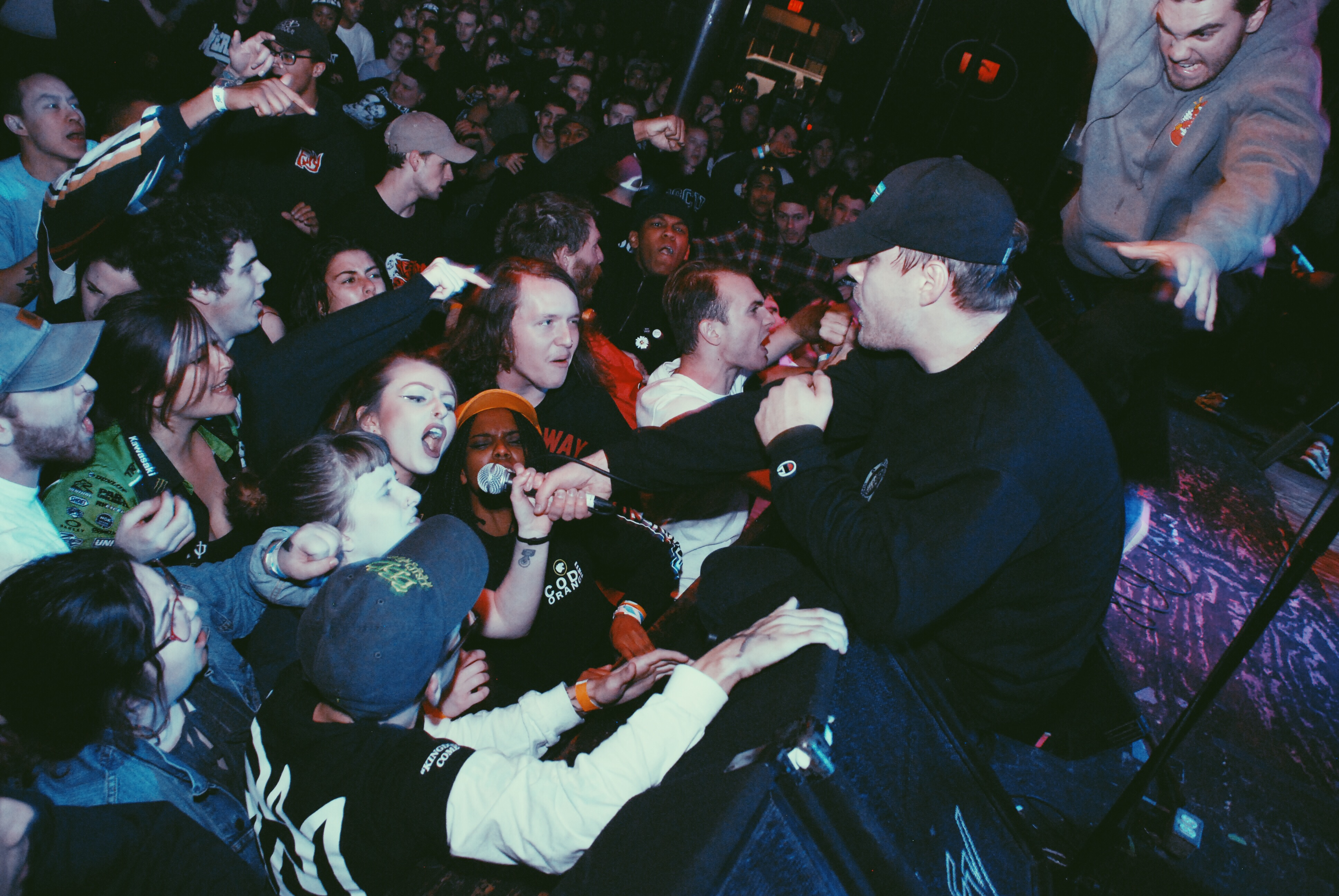
Tripp performing live with Angel Dust in 2016

Tripp was featured on the song "Evaporate" by Atlanta hardcore band Foundation, which was released as a part of their album Hang Your Head on December 1, 2009. Pulling Teeth released their album Funerary on June 17, 2011, which included the song "From Birth" featuring Tripp. On July 3, 2012, he was featured on the song "Maternity" by Gideon, from their album Milestone. On September 18, 2012, Pennsylvania hardcore band Agitator released the song "Concrete Opinions", featuring Tripp.

In 2016, Tripp founded independent record label Pop Wig Records alongside Brendan Yates and Daniel Fang of Angel Dust and Turnstile. The label went on to release material by Iron Reagan, Truth Cult, Mary Jane Dunphe, Razorbumps and Bib.

Tripp was featured on the song "Love and Hate" by Suburban Scum, released on March 11, 2016. On May 15, 2020, the two track single Regional Jurtice Center was released, a collaboration between Tripp and Seattle powerviolence project Regional Justice Center. On June 15, 2020, Tripp was featured on the song "New Wage Slavery" by Baltimore hardcore band End It. Tripp provided backing vocals for the Touché Amoré song "Lament" from their October 9, 2020 album Lament.

On June 3, 2022, Tripp announced his bedroom pop solo-project Cold Mega and surprise released his self-titled debut album. On September 13, 2022, he released "Swingin' The Dog".

Tripp, alongside Sam Trapkin, featured on the song "Never Die", released by Never Ending Game, which was released on March 22, 2023. Tripp featured on the song "Too Late" by Pain of Truth, which was released on September 9, 2023, as a part of their Not Through Blood. Tripp provided guitars and saxophone for the Nicole Dollanganger album Married In Mount Airy (2023). On May 14, 2024, Candy released the single "You Will Never Get Me", featuring Tripp on guest vocals. Tripp was featured on the Firewalker song "Hell Bent", which was released on June 28, 2024.

== Personal life ==
Tripp followed a straight edge lifestyle from his teens into his thirties. Due to his anxiety disorder, which prescription drugs did not help, he eventually began consuming cannabidiol, which in turn led to him frequently using cannabis. In 2022, he was hospitalised due to symptoms of a stroke, which the doctors later determined was a mental breakdown, in response he was recommended to smoke cannabis. In a 2023 interview with Norman Brannon, Tripp stated "I like smoking pot. I smoke kind of a lot".

He is diagnosed with celiac disease, lactose intolerance and irritable bowel syndrome.

== Discography ==
With Trapped Under Ice

- Secrets of the World (Reaper Records, 2009)
- Big Kiss Goodnight (Reaper Records, 2011)
- Heatwave (Pop Wig Records, 2017)

With Sai Nam

- Crush (Reaper Records, 2012)

With Angel Dust

- A.D. (React! Records/Reaper Records, 2014)
- Rock the Fuck on Forever (Pop Wig Records, 2016)
- Pretty Buff (Roadrunner Records, 2019)
- YAK: A Collection of Truck Songs (Roadrunner Records, 2021)
- Brand New Soul (Pop Wig Records, 2023)
- Cold 2 The Touch (Run For Cover Records, 2026)

With Warfare

- Declaration (Triple B Records, 2018)
- Doomsday (Triple B Records, 2022)

As Cold Mega

- Cold Mega (Let's Pretend Records, 2022)

=== As a featured artist ===
- Foundation – "Evaporate" (2009)
- Pulling Teeth – "From Birth" (2011)
- Gideon – "Maternity" (2012)
- Agitator – "Concrete Opinions" (2012)
- Suburban Scum – "Love and Hate" (2016)
- Regional Justice Center – Regional Jurtice Center (2020)
- End It – "New Wage Slavery" (2020)
- Lil Ugly Mane – "Floorboards" (2022)
- Never Ending Game – "Never Die" (2023)
- Pain of Truth – "Too Late" (2023)
- Candy – "You Will Never Get Me" (2024)
- Firewalker – "Hell Bent" (2024)
- Missing Link — “See Ya Later” (2024)
