= Proof =

Proof most often refers to:

- Proof (truth), argument or sufficient evidence for the truth of a proposition
- Alcohol proof, a measure of an alcoholic drink's strength

Proof may also refer to:

== Mathematics and formal logic ==
- Formal proof, a construct in proof theory
- Mathematical proof, a convincing demonstration that some mathematical statement is necessarily true
- Proof complexity, computational resources required to prove statements
- Proof procedure, method for producing proofs in proof theory
- Proof theory, a branch of mathematical logic that represents proofs as formal mathematical objects
- Statistical proof, demonstration of degree of certainty for a hypothesis

== Law and philosophy ==
- Evidence, information which tends to determine or demonstrate the truth of a proposition
- Evidence (law), tested evidence or a legal proof
- Legal burden of proof, duty to establish the truth of facts in a trial
- Philosophic burden of proof, obligation on a party in a dispute to provide sufficient warrant for their position
- Probate, the judicial process whereby a will is "proved" in a court of law and accepted as valid

== Manufacturing and printing ==
- Artist's proof, a single print taken during the printmaking process
- Galley proof, a preliminary version of a publication
- Prepress proof, a facsimile of press artwork for job verification
- Proof coinage, coins once made as a test, but now specially struck for collectors
- Proof of concept, demonstration that a concept has practical potential
- Proof test, stress test of structures such as vessels and weapons
- Proofreading, reviewing a manuscript for errors or improvements

== People ==
- Proof (rapper) (1973–2006), American rapper and member of D12

== Places ==
- Proof School, San Francisco, California, USA; a secondary school

== Arts and entertainment and media ==
=== Film ===
- Proof, a 1980 student film by Kevin Reynolds, expanded to Fandango
- Proof (1991 film), an Australian film by Jocelyn Moorhouse
- Proof (2005 film), a film by John Madden, based on the 2000 play by David Auburn
- The Proof, a 2026 upcoming Tamil film

=== Television ===
- Proof (2004 TV series), an Irish drama/thriller
- Proof (2015 TV series), an American medical/supernatural drama
- "Proof" (Devious Maids), a television episode
- "The Proof", an episode of Season 1 of The Forest Rangers, 1963
- "The Proof", an episode of Ika-6 na Utos, 2017
- "The Proof", an episode of Maddim Sir, 2020
- "The Proof", an episode of Season 2 of Penny on M.A.R.S., 2019
- "The Proof", an episode of Chapter 2 of Roohaniyat, 2022

=== Literature ===
- Proof (comics), a comic series from Image Comics
- "Proof", a 1942 science fiction short story by Hal Clement
- PROOF!, a magazine published by Lynne McTaggart
- Proof, print magazine of online platform The Justice Gap
- The Proof, a novel by Agota Kristof published in 1988

=== Music ===
==== Albums and records ====
- Proof, an album by Emily Elbert, 2010
- Proof, an EP by Colour Coding, 2012
- Proof (album), an anthology album by BTS, 2022

==== Songs and singles ====
- "Proof" (I Am Kloot song), 2003
- "Proof" (Paul Simon song), 1991
- "Proof"/"No Vain", a single by Mell, 2007
- "Proof", a song by Angela, 2004
- "Proof", a song by Chris Brown from Royalty, 2015
- "Proof", a song by Coldplay, a B-side of the single "Speed of Sound", 2005
- "Proof", a song by Happy Rhodes from Many Worlds Are Born Tonight, 1998
- "Proof", a song by Paramore from Paramore, 2013
- "The Proof", a song by Jill Tracy from Diabolical Streak, 1999
- "The Proof", a song from the soundtrack of Godzilla: Final Wars, 2004
- "The Proof", a song by High Flight Society from the album Lights Come Down, 2011
- "The Proof", a song by Jet Trouble, 2018
- The Proof, a mixtape by Reason, 2016

== Other arts and media ==
- Proof (play), a 2000 play by David Auburn
- The Proof, a podcast founded by Simon Hill (nutritionist)

== See also ==
- Proofing (disambiguation)
- Provability (disambiguation)
- Homeopathic proving, a homeopathic procedure
- Proof Positive (disambiguation)
- Living Proof (disambiguation)
- Fool proof (disambiguation)
- 100 Proof (disambiguation)
