= Gulch (disambiguation) =

A gulch is a deep V-shaped valley formed by erosion.

Gulch or The Gulch may also refer to:

- Gulch (band), an American hardcore punk band
- Gulch (horse), a thoroughbred horse
- Gulch (Ninjago), character from Ninjago
- The Gulch (Atlanta), a district in Atlanta, Georgia
- The Gulch (Nashville), a neighborhood in Nashville, Tennessee
