= Iain Duncan Smith as Work and Pensions Secretary =

UK Government appointment from 2010 to 2016

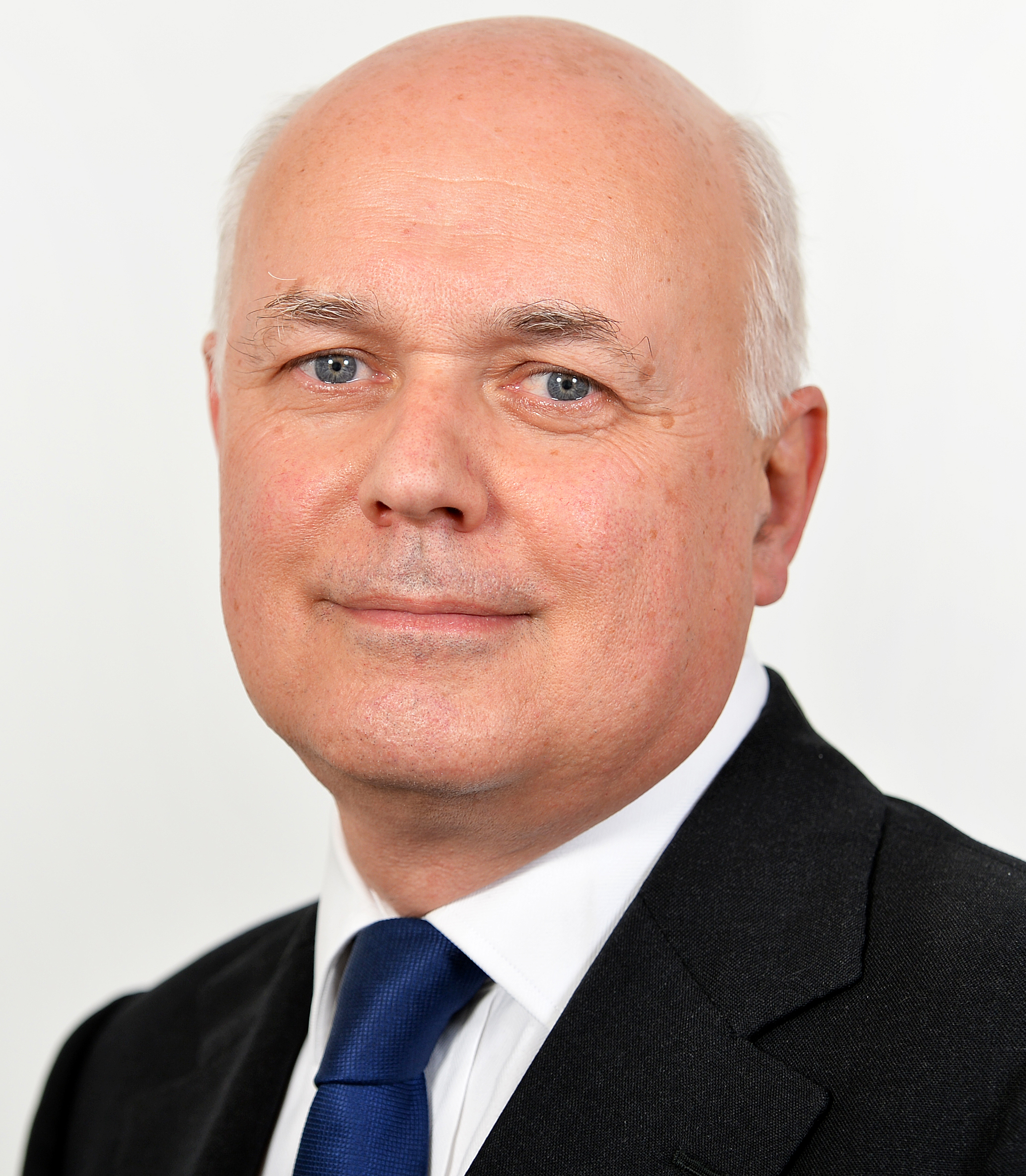
- Iain Duncan Smith in his 2015 official portrait
- Iain Duncan Smith's tenure as Work and Pensions Secretary; 12 May 2010 – 18 March 2016
- Party: Conservative
- Election: 2010, 2015
- Nominated by: David Cameron
- Appointed by: Elizabeth II

Iain Duncan Smith served as Secretary of State for Work and Pensions from 2010 to 2016. A member and previous leader of the Conservative Party, Duncan Smith was appointed to the cabinet by Prime Minister David Cameron following the 2010 general election and the formation of the coalition government between the Conservatives and the Liberal Democrats. He was reappointed after the Conservatives won a majority in the 2015 general election but resigned in March 2016 in opposition to disability benefit cuts.

Under Duncan Smith, the Department for Work and Pensions (DWP) rolled out Universal Credit and a new Work Programme, as well as implemented a real terms cut in benefits and increased the number of benefit eligibility tests being carried out. During his time as Work and Pensions Secretary, the DWP was criticised for rises in food poverty and people being forced to use foodbanks and he himself was criticised for breaking the Code of Practice for Official Statistics.

== Views ==
Outlining the scale of unemployment following the 2008 financial crisis and previous Labour government, Duncan Smith said almost five million people were on unemployment benefits, 1.4 million of whom had been receiving support for nine or more of the last 10 years. In addition, 1.4 million under-25s were neither working nor in full-time education. He said; "This picture is set against a backdrop of 13 years of continuously increasing expenditure, which has outstripped inflation...Worse than the growing expense though, is the fact that the money is not even making the impact we want it to...A system that was originally designed to support the poorest in society is now trapping them in the very condition it was supposed to alleviate."

== Pension age ==
In June 2010, Duncan Smith said the government would encourage people to work for longer by making it illegal for companies to force staff to give up work at 65, and by bringing forward the planned rises in the age for claiming the state pension. Duncan Smith told The Daily Telegraph pension reforms were intended to "reinvigorate retirement". "People are living longer and healthier lives than ever, and the last thing we want is to lose their skills and experience from the workplace due to an arbitrary age limit," he said. "Now is absolutely the right time to live up to our responsibility to reform our outdated pension system and to take action where the previous government failed to do so. If Britain is to have a stable, affordable pension system, people need to work longer, but we will reward their hard work with a decent state pension that will enable them to enjoy quality of life in their retirement."

== Universal Credit ==
In July 2010, Duncan Smith announced a far more radical series of reforms intended to simplify the benefits and tax credits scheme into a single payment to be known as Universal Credit. A major aim of welfare reform was to ensure that low earners would always be better off in employment. "After years of piecemeal reform the current welfare system is complex and unfair," said Duncan Smith, citing examples of people under the existing system who would see very little incremental income from increasing their working hours due to withdrawal of other benefits. Outlining the scheme in more detail in November 2010, Duncan Smith promised "targeted work activity for those who need to get used to the habits of work" and sanctions, including the possible removal of benefits for up to three years for those who refused to work. He said welfare reform would benefit all those who "play by the rules" and ensure "work always pays more" by easing the rate at which benefits are withdrawn as income rises.

The next phase of welfare reform announced by Duncan Smith in late 2011 required benefits claimants with part-time incomes below a certain threshold to search for additional work or risk losing access to their benefits. "We are already requiring people on out of work benefits to do more to prepare for and look for work," he said. "Now we are looking to change the rules for those who are in-work and claiming benefits, so that once they have overcome their barriers and got into work, in time they can reduce their dependency or come off benefits altogether." He said that benefits were not a route out of child poverty but hundreds of thousands of children could be lifted out of child poverty if one of their parents were to work at least a 35-hour week at the national minimum wage.

Duncan Smith argued a proposed £26,000-a-year benefits cap would not lead to a rise in homelessness or child poverty. "The reality is that with £26,000 a year, it’s very difficult to believe that families will be plunged into poverty – children or adults," he told BBC Radio 4's Today programme. "Capping at average earnings of £35,000 before tax and £26,000 after, actually means that we are going to work with families make sure that they will find a way out." He added there would need to be "discretionary measures". Duncan Smith led the government's legislation in the House of Commons in January 2013 to cap most benefit increases at 1%, a real terms cut. In April 2013, he said he could live on £53 per week as Work and Pensions Secretary, after a benefits claimant told the BBC he had £53 per week after housing costs.

In September 2013, Duncan Smith's department cancelled a week of "celebrations" to mark the impact of enhanced benefit sanctions. General secretary of the Public and Commercial Services Union (PCS) Mark Serwotka commented: "It is distasteful in the extreme and grossly offensive that the DWP would even consider talking about celebrating cutting people's benefits." In the same month, the department was subject to an "excoriating" National Audit Office report, in which it was accused of having "weak management, ineffective control and poor governance; a fortress mentality, a "good news" reporting culture, a lack of transparency, inadequate financial control, and ineffective oversight" as well as wasting £34 million on inadequate computer systems.

The Department for Work and Pensions had said that 1 million people would be placed on the new Universal Credit benefits system by April 2014, yet by October 2014 only 15,000 were assigned to UC. Duncan Smith said that a final delivery date would not be set for this, declaring "Arbitrary dates and deadlines are the enemy of secure delivery." In 2014, it was reported that his department was employing debt collectors to retrieve overpaid benefits, the overpayment purely down to calculation mistakes by HMRC.

== Work Programme ==
In June 2011, Duncan Smith announced earlier welfare-to-work programs would be replaced with a single Work Programme, which included incentives for private sector service providers to help the unemployed find long term employment. Further developments included the requirement for some long term recipients of Job Seekers Allowance to undertake unpaid full-time work placements with private companies. After the "workfare" element of this programmed was successfully challenged in the courts, Duncan Smith sought to re-establish the legality of the scheme through emergency and retrospective legislation. Legal experts were said to be "outraged" that the bill applied retrospectively, breaking a key standard of British law. In 2014, the High Court ruled the retrospective nature of the legislation interfered with the "right to a fair trial" under Article 6 of the European Convention on Human Rights.

== Winter fuel payments ==
In April 2013, Duncan Smith called for wealthier people to voluntarily return winter fuel payments, given to all pensioners regardless of wealth, to help reduce the strain on public finances. This suggestion prompted media comment, with some wealthier pensioners stating they had already tried to return their payments, for this same reason, but had this offer refused by the government because there was no mechanism in place to receive returned payments.

== Use of statistics ==
In July 2013, Duncan Smith was found by Andrew Dilnot, then Head of the UK Statistics Authority, to have broken their Code of Practice for Official Statistics for his and the DWP's use of figures in support of government policies. Dilnot also stated, following an earlier complaint about the handling of statistics by Duncan Smith's department, he had previously been told, "that senior DWP officials had reiterated to their staff the seriousness of their obligations under the Code of Practice and that departmental procedures would be reviewed".

Duncan Smith's defended his department, saying: "You cannot absolutely prove those two things are connected – you cannot disprove what I said. I believe this to be right." This led Jonathan Portes, director of the National Institute of Economic and Social Research and former chief economist at the Cabinet Office, to accuse the Conservative Party of going beyond spin and the normal political practice of cherry picking of figures to the act of actually "making things up" with respect to the impact of government policy on employment and other matters.

On World Food Day in October 2013, foodbank provider The Trussell Trust called for an inquiry to investigate the trebling in numbers of people using their foodbanks in the past year and the rise in UK hunger and food poverty which they described as reaching "scandalous" levels. Oxfam commented: "These figures lay bare the shocking scale of destitution, hardship and hunger in the UK. It is completely unacceptable that in the seventh wealthiest nation on the planet, the number of people turning to foodbanks has tripled." According to the BBC, the number of people given three days food by the Trussell Trust increased from 40,000 in 2009–10 to 913,000 by 2013–14. A letter signed by 27 bishops earlier in 2014 blamed "cutbacks and failures in the benefits system" for driving people to foodbanks.

== Disability benefits policy ==
The Guardian reported Duncan Smith's department announced on the 2012 United Nations' International Day of Persons with Disabilities forced work for disabled people who received welfare benefits, in order to "Improve disabled people's chances of getting work by mandatory employment". From this United Nations appointed day onwards, people with disabilities and illnesses ranging from cancer to paralysis to mental health would be forced by the UK government to work for free or else they could risk being stripped of up to 70% of their welfare benefits.

In September 2013, leaked documents showed that Duncan Smith was looking at "how to make it harder for sick and disabled people to claim benefits". Duncan Smith was advised that it would be illegal to introduce secondary legislation, which does not require parliament's approval, in order to give job centre staff more powers to make those who were claiming Employment and Support Allowance undertake more tests to prove that they were making a serious effort to come off benefits and find a job. The powers being discussed also included "forcing sick and disabled people to take up offers of work." DWP staff would also have the power to strip claimants with serious, but time-limited health conditions, of benefits if they refuse the offer of work.

In June 2015, a judge ruled that there had been a "breach of duty on the part of the secretary of state to act without unreasonable delay in determination of the claimant's claims for PIP," the replacement for Disability Living Allowance. One of the claimants, an ME sufferer with visual impairment was twice required to travel to attend an assessment, a request which the judge described as irrational.

On 3 July 2015, a group of over "70 leading Catholics" wrote to Duncan Smith asking him to rewrite his policies to make them more in line with Catholic and Christian values. The writers stated that whilst they believed he wanted to improve lives, they believed his policies were having the opposite effect and they asked him to rethink and abandon further damaging cuts.

In August 2015, he was criticised after the DWP admitted publishing fake testimonies of claimants enjoying their benefits cuts. Later the same month, publication of statistics showed 2,380 people died in a 3-year period shortly after a work capability assessment declared them fit for work leading Jeremy Corbyn to call for Duncan Smith's resignation. At his party's conference in October 2015, Duncan Smith said in a speech about the sick and disabled "we won't lift you out of poverty by simply transferring taxpayers' money to you. With our help, you'll work your way out of poverty," and criticised the current system which he said "makes doctors ask a simplistic question: are you too sick to work at all? If the answer is yes, they’re signed off work – perhaps for ever."

== Party relationship ==
In the September 2012 Cabinet reshuffle, Duncan Smith was offered the job as Secretary of State for Justice replacing Kenneth Clarke, but declined, and remained in his post at the DWP. Duncan Smith dismissed allegations in Matthew d'Ancona's 2013 book In It Together that Chancellor George Osborne had referred to him as "not clever enough", which were also denied by Osborne. Duncan Smith said that similar claims had been made of Winston Churchill and Margaret Thatcher.

== Ministerial resignation ==
On 18 March 2016, Duncan Smith unexpectedly resigned from David Cameron's Cabinet. He stated he was unable to accept the government's planned cuts to disability benefits. He broadened this position, in a following interview on The Andrew Marr Show, launching an attack on the "government's austerity programme for balancing the books on the backs of the poor and vulnerable", describing this as divisive and "deeply unfair", and adding: "It is in danger of drifting in a direction that divides society rather than unites it." Duncan Smith had opposed Cameron over the 2016 EU membership referendum but sources close to Duncan Smith said his resignation was not about Europe. Nadine Dorries MP tweeted Duncan Smith had sought her out and "personally begged" her to vote for the planned cuts.

== See also ==
- Premiership of David Cameron
