= Jill Tracy =

American musician

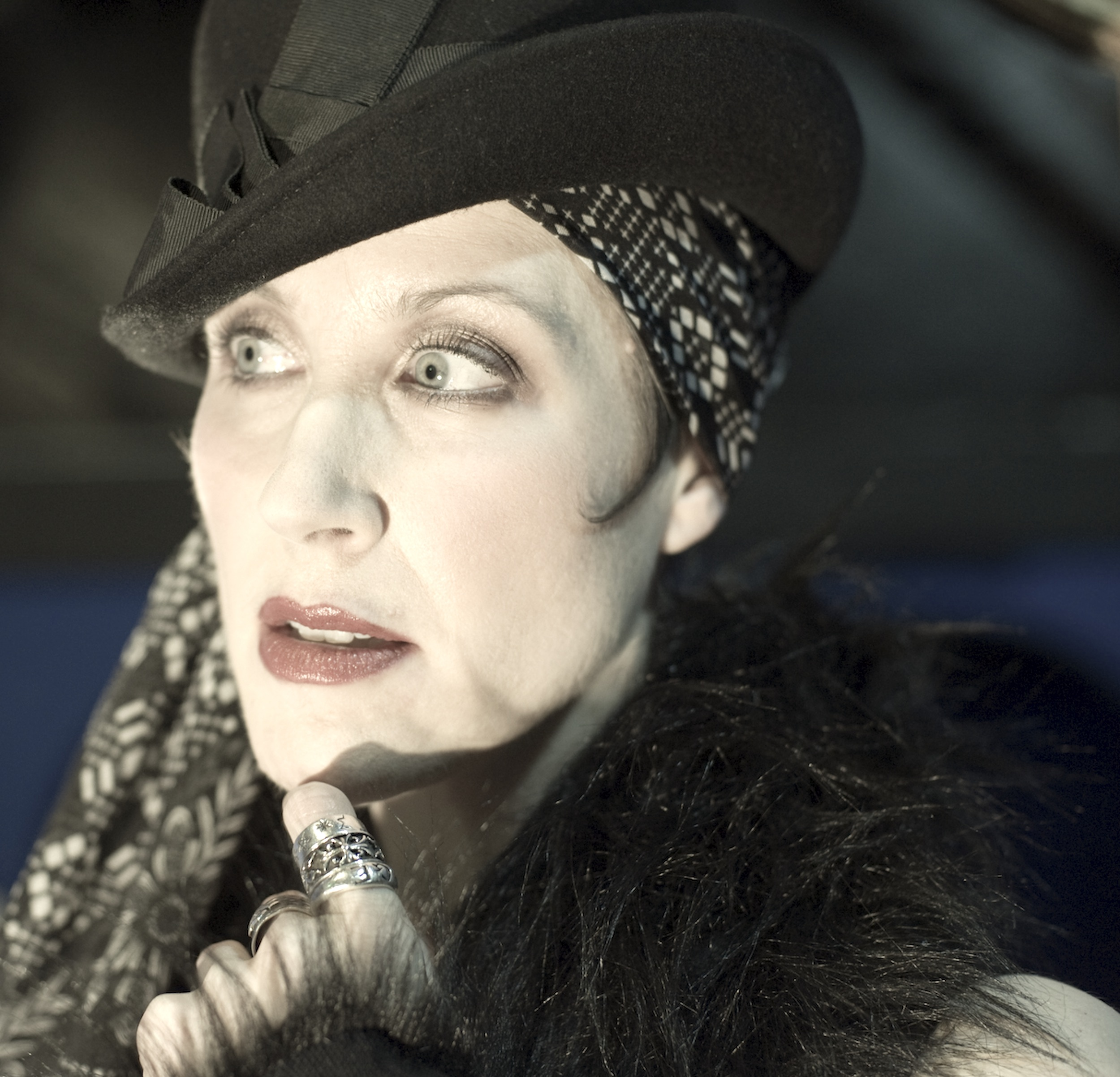
- Jill Tracy in 2010

Background information
- Genres: Contemporary classical, gothic rock, dark cabaret, alternative rock, dark ambient
- Occupations: singer-songwriter, composer, pianist, storyteller, writer
- Instruments: piano, voice
- Years active: 1995–present
- Website: www.JILLTRACY.com

Jill Tracy is a composer, singer, pianist, storyteller and "musical evocateur" based in San Francisco.

Jill Tracy is listed in San Francisco Magazine's Top 100 Creative Forces in the Bay Area, has been awarded "Best of the Bay" by the San Francisco Bay Guardian, and has been nominated for two California Music Awards and SF Weekly Music Awards.

She has been hailed a "bad-ass icon" by SFist and "a femme fatale for the thinking man" by the San Francisco Chronicle, which is a moniker that is now frequently used to describe her.

== Career ==
Following her 1996 solo debut CD Quintessentially Unreal, Tracy released Diabolical Streak (1999), her first studio album featuring The Malcontent Orchestra. The song "Evil Night Together" was awarded the SIBL international Grand Prize for songwriting. The album was listed among the "Top 10 Neo-Cabaret albums of all time" in Shift magazine. "Evil Night Together" has been featured on the CBS show NCIS, the feature film "Dr. Jekyll and Mr. Hyde" (2008), and Showtime chose the tune to promote the final season of Dexter (2013) in a promo entitled "The Final Symphony."

"The Fine Art of Poisoning," also from Diabolical Streak, became an animated short film in 2003, a collaboration with Bay Area animator Bill Domonkos. "The Fine Art of Poisoning" has garnered film festival awards internationally, including Best Experimental Film in the 2003 New Orleans Film Festival and the 2003 Empire Film Festival in Buffalo, NY, as well as Best Music Video in both the 2003 Cineme – Chicago International Animation Festival and the Seattle International Film Festival.

FEARnet licensed "The Fine Art of Poisoning" in 2012 as part of their permanent short film collection.

Jill Tracy and The Malcontent Orchestra's original score to F.W. Murnau’s 1922 silent vampire classic Nosferatu debuted live at San Francisco's Foreign Cinema in 1999 and toured Northern California theatres during Halloween season for five consecutive years. This led to the 2002 CD release Into the Land of Phantoms, selections from the Nosferatu score.

Jill Tracy released her fourth album, The Bittersweet Constrain, in 2008, produced by Alex Nahas. The remixed instrumental arrangements were released as a follow-up album, Beneath: the Bittersweet Constrain (2011). The surreal sepia portraits of Jill Tracy on the album are by outsider photographer Michael Garlington. Nature and taxidermy imagery are featured in the album artwork. Photos of Jill Tracy having a tea party in a garden with taxidermied animals, including birds, dogs, a two-headed calf, and a monkey were shot in the backyard of taxidermist and collector Tia Resleure.

From 2000 to 2015, Jill Tracy performed as "Belle of the Ball," headlining the popular Edwardian Ball, an annual costumed event in San Francisco and Los Angeles in homage to artist Edward Gorey.

Since 2015, she has been a headlining performer in the annual Flower Piano Festival, which draws 60,000 people a year to San Francisco Botanical Garden in Golden Gate Park.

She began collaborating and performing with David J (Bauhaus, Love and Rockets) in 2009, releasing two singles in 2010. Accompanying him on piano during live concerts, she developed a post-classical cinematic version of "Bela Lugosi's Dead," and composed a 2-minute solo piano intro which gradually revealed the rhythm of the classic tune as the band joined in. This was released as "Bela Lugosi's Dead (Undead is Forever)" by "David J (with Jill Tracy)" in 2013. "We recorded practically in pitch darkness," Jill says of the session, which was captured live in a single take. "That's why there is such a gorgeous, seductive urgency to the piece: the band could only hear… and feel… and react."

In 2019, she was invited by Bauhaus frontman Peter Murphy to be the opening act for his historical San Francisco and New York City residencies, as well as several of his shows on the Ruby Tour, celebrating 40 Years of Bauhaus (with bassist David J). She got to perform with the band, performing her original piano arrangements on "Bela Lugosi’s Dead," as well as "Who Killed Mr. Moonlight."

=== Location-based projects and the Sonic Séance ===
In 2007, he began collaborating with Atlanta-based violinist Paul Mercer. The duo performs "The Musical Séance," a touring show featuring piano and violin duets. The performances are based on stories and objects provided by the audience.

Jill Tracy is known for researching and composing alone at a piano in mysterious locales. Using the history, energy, frequency, resonant tones, and emotion of an environment to uncover spontaneous music. She calls these projects "The Sonic Séance," her own singular approach of "musical excavation" or "sonic archeology." These projects are done both with and without an audience. She has composed music at Victoria, B.C.'s landmark 1890 Craigdarroch Castle, San Francisco Conservatory of Flowers, abandoned asylums, mansions, cemeteries, and has worked with the San Francisco Botanical Garden since 2015 presenting her Sonic Séance live at night to audiences inside the Ancient Redwood Grove and the Garden of Fragrance, among others.

Jill Tracy is the first musician in history to receive a grant from the renowned Mütter Museum in Philadelphia (Francis C. Wood Institute), the nation's foremost collection of medical oddities. She is creating a musical work inspired by the Mütter collection, and her experiences after-dark inside the museum. She spent nights alone composing music amidst the Mütter's vast collection of skeletons and specimens—which include the conjoined livers and a plaster death cast of the bodies of renowned "Siamese Twins" Chang and Eng, Einstein's brain, Harry Eastlack "The Ossified Man," books bound in human skin, and The Mermaid Baby. This in-progress project (which began in 2012) is called "The Teratology Lullabies."

She was invited by San Francisco's historical Presidio Trust to research its archives and tour abandoned military buildings (dating back to 1776) with old records of supernatural occurrence. She interviewed over 50 Presidio employees, revealing their first-hand ghostly encounters spanning decades. This became her acclaimed stage show "Legends of the Presidio Ghosts," which premiered in the famed Presidio Officers Club Ballroom, featuring music composed on-site inspired her discoveries. For the past three years, it has developed into a nighttime lantern walking tour for visitors, as Jill Tracy guides them to the haunted locations, shares their stories, and performs a Sonic Séance live.

The Secret Music of Lily Dale was released in 2022.

== Discography ==
=== Albums ===
- Quintessentially Unreal (1996)
- Diabolical Streak (1999)
- Into the Land of Phantoms (2002)
- The Bittersweet Constrain (2008)
- BENEATH: The Bittersweet Constrain (2011)
- Silver Smoke, Star of Night (Christmas album 2012)
- A Medicine for Madness: The 2020 Isolation Piano Recordings (2020)
- The Secret Music of Lily Dale (2022)

=== EPs and singles ===
- Under the Fate of the Blue Moon (single 2011)
- Lament for the Queen of Disks (single 2014)
- Evocations of the Moon (4 track EP 2020)
- Seclusion 22 / Whispers Behind the Glass (2 track EP 2020)
- The Dark Day (3 track EP 2020)
- Elegy for a Solitary Year (single 2020)

=== Compilations ===
- "Meantime" on Market Street, Best of Café du Nord (live) (2000)
- "Evil Night Together" on SIBL (Songs Inspired by Literature) Artists for Literacy (2002)
- "Evil Night Together" on Projekt's A Dark Cabaret (2005)
- "Torture" on The Sepiachord Companion (2009)
- "In Between Shades" on Projekt's A Dark Cabaret 2 (2011)
- "Coventry Carol" on Projekt's Ornamental (2012)
- "Totenmesse (The Colour of the Flame)" on Songs of Decadence: A Soundtrack to the Writings of Stanisław Przybyszewski (2013)

=== Collaborations ===
- "Blood Sucker Blues / Tidal Wave Of Blood" by David J. + Shok (2010)
- "Bela Lugosi's Dead (Undead is Forever)" with David J. (2013)

== Films ==
- In the Wake (2001) Jill Tracy narrates the film, the song "Extraordinary" is featured in the score.
- The Fine Art of Poisoning (2003) short film collaboration/music video project with animator Bill Domonkos.
- Heavy Put Away (2003) appears as nightclub singer, performed piano score, "Evil Night Together" is the film's end title song. (FOX Searchlight)
- Ice Cream Ants (2006) stars as the sinister Mona, performed/composed title song "Pulling Your Insides Out." (director: Jeremy Carr)
- The Black Dahlia (2007) composed/performed the song "Pulling Your Insides Out."
- NERVOUS96 (2011) Jill Tracy and violinist Paul Mercer scored this surreal short from filmmaker Bill Domonkos
- Other Madnesses (2015) Jill Tracy composed/performed the end title song "Dreamland," a haunting, melancholy remake of the 1904 tune "All Aboard For Dreamland." (director: Jeremy Carr)
- Dark Tryst (2023) Jill Tracy's music scores this animated short film from horror author Bradley Harper.

== TV ==
- Dr. Jekyll and Mr. Hyde (Ion Network) – features Jill Tracy's song "Evil Night Together".
- Jekyll (BBC) – features "Evil Night Together".
- NCIS (CBS-TV) Episode "Ravenous" – features "Evil Night Together".
- The History Detectives (PBS)- features Jill Tracy's song "The Fine Art of Poisoning."
- Showtime Networks chose "Evil Night Together" to promote the final season (8) of Dexter, "The Final Symphony".

== Written works ==
- The Keeper of the Shop- published in Morbid Curiosity Magazine No. 6
- The Next Best Thing to Stevie Nicks- published in Morbid Curiosity Magazine No. 8
- The Keeper of the Shop- published in anthology Morbid Curiosity Cures the Blues (Scribner 2009)
- At Louche Ends- Jill Tracy writes foreword for Maria Alexander poetry collection (Burning Effigy Press 2011)
