= W. G. G. Duncan Smith =

British flying ace (1914–1996)

Group Captain Wilfrid Duncan Smith DSO & Bar DFC & Two Bars AE
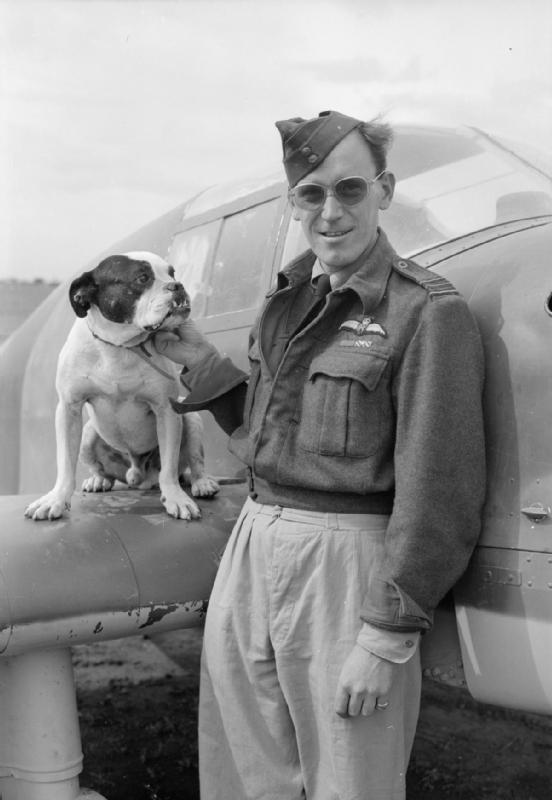
- Wing Commander Smith with "Bonzo", an RAF squadron bulldog mascot in Italy, 1943
- Born: 28 May 1914; Madras, Madras Presidency, British India
- Died: 11 December 1996 (aged 82)
- Relatives: Iain Duncan Smith (son)
- Military career
- Allegiance: United Kingdom
- Branch: Royal Air Force
- Service years: 1936–1960
- Rank: Group Captain
- Nickname: Smithy
- Service number: 85684
- Commands: No. 64 Squadron RAF
- Conflicts: Second World War; Malayan Emergency
- Awards: Distinguished Service Order & Bar; Distinguished Flying Cross & Two Bars; Air Efficiency Award

Wilfrid George Gerald Duncan Smith (28 May 1914 – 11 December 1996) was a flying ace of the Second World War in the Royal Air Force. He was the father of Iain Duncan Smith, a Member of Parliament and Leader of the Conservative Party.

== Early life ==
Duncan Smith was born in Madras, India (now Chennai) on 28 May 1914, the son of a Mysore Post Office Superintendent, Wilfrid Arthur Smith and Anna Cecilia Smith (née Duncan). He was educated at Nairn and Morrison's Academy, Crieff, in Scotland, where he joined his school's Officers' Training Corps. Returning to India in 1933, he became a coffee and tea planter, but in 1936 returned to Britain to work as a mechanical engineer, and then was a salesman for Great Western Motors in Reading. With war looming, he joined the Royal Air Force Volunteer Reserve (RAFVR).

== Second World War ==
A sergeant at the start of the Second World War, Duncan Smith was commissioned as a pilot officer (on probation) on 29 September 1940. Serving with No. 7 Operational Training Unit at the outbreak of war, Duncan Smith was posted to the Spitfire-equipped No. 611 Squadron RAF at RAF Hornchurch in October 1940. He was awarded a Distinguished Flying Cross (DFC) in June 1941, and went to No. 603 Squadron RAF in August 1941 as a Flight Commander. Duncan Smith was due for a rest but had to remain operational, leading his squadron while bringing their new squadron leader up to speed. He was promoted to flying officer (war-substantive) on 29 September. On 20 November he was taken ill, passing out after returning from a convoy patrol. Duncan Smith spent some time in hospital with double pneumonia (affecting both lungs), the symptoms of which he had assumed was only the result of exhaustion from a long operational tour.

Upon recovery in January 1942, Duncan Smith rejoined the Hornchurch Wing, now flying the improved Spitfire Mk.IX. In March 1942 he was promoted to acting squadron leader and given command of No. 64 Squadron RAF. He was promoted to flight lieutenant (war-substantive) on 27 June.

During the ill-fated Dieppe Raid on 19 August, Duncan Smith was shot down by an enemy fighter but rescued from the English Channel with injuries and eardrum pain. In August he became an acting wing commander (flying) at RAF North Weald. In November he was rested from operations with a posting to take charge of the Tactics Branch at Fighter Command, his input leading to the formation of the Fighter Command School of Tactics at RAF Charmy Down. He was promoted to squadron leader (war-substantive) on 30 November.

While Duncan Smith's non-operational tour was recognised as very productive, he began to seek a return to operations, and he was sent to Malta to command the 244th Fighter Wing. During this time he flew in support of the Allied landings on Sicily. On 12 July his Mark IX Spitfire was badly damaged in combat, but this episode ended well when he landed at Safi airfield on Malta with his aircraft riddled with cannon shells in fuselage, elevator and rudder:

My Spitfire was in a mess. Cannon shells had blasted a couple of large holes in the side. One had burst against the radio and armour behind my seat. Another, having made a hole the size of a football, had torn the control wires to shreds. The elevator was hanging by one thread of frayed wire and my rigger neatly snapped this with a sharp blow from his fingers. "You will not be needing that any more," he grinned at me. "It all looks very untidy – doesn't it?" Another cannon shell had torn big pieces out of the elevator and rudder surfaces.

Potential victors could be Experten Feldwebel Heinrich Steis from 4./JG 27 or Oberfeldwebel Günther "Hupatz" Seeger of 7./JG 53. On 2 September 1943, just before the invasion of Italy, Duncan Smith ran out of fuel when a switch between fuel tanks failed. He was forced to bail out into the sea, injuring his kneecap in the process. He was rescued after more than six hours adrift. He was very lucky for a second time; while he was being dragged to the Air Sea Rescue Services Supermarine Walrus by a rope, the Walrus was severely shot up by an enemy fighter:

The Walrus was badly holed below the water and a cannon shell had pierced the wing tank, but luckily, though petrol spewed all over the place, the old bus did not catch fire. The blow I felt was from a bullet that tore through the collar of my Mae West grazing my neck before smacking into the Walrus. We got down at Milazzon safely, after a brilliant landing by the pilot, and I was whisked off to the American field hospital close by. There they were very kind and after fixing up my leg and dressing the neck wound tried to keep me for the night, but I managed to talk the doctor into letting me return to Lentini. The Walrus Air Sea Rescue aircraft was a total wreck having been damaged in too many vital parts.

The sad end to the story, other than Duncan Smith losing his footwear in the sea, was news that his comrade Dick Charrington had been shot down and killed during this rescue mission by an enemy fighter. Charrington may have been shot down by Unteroffizier Alfred Scharl of 2./JG 53 who was credited with a kill at 17:20 2 September 1943, 15 km north of Tropea at low altitude. The identity of the German pilot who severely damaged the Walrus is not known. After all those sunburns, injuries, wounds and the return of his ear pain from 19 August 1942, Duncan Smith was considered unfit for action. As an acting group captain, he then took charge of 324 Wing, finally leaving in March 1945.

Duncan Smith was credited with 17 enemy aircraft shot down, two shared destroyed, six probables, two shared probables and eight damaged in aerial combat. He was awarded the Distinguished Service Order and Bar and the DFC and Bar in recognition of his bravery.

He was the author of Spitfire into Battle (1981), an account of aerial combat in the Supermarine Spitfire.

== Post war ==
On 3 December 1946, Duncan Smith was promoted to the temporary rank of squadron leader in the RAFVR (seniority from 1 November 1946), receiving promotion to the substantive rank of flight lieutenant in the RAFVR on 1 November 1947 (seniority from 1 December 1942). On 22 March 1948, he was appointed to a permanent RAF commission in the rank of squadron leader, with seniority from the same date. He received a second Bar to his DFC for service in the Malayan Emergency in 1952, and was promoted to wing commander on 1 January 1953. He retired on 24 November 1960, retaining the rank of group captain.

== Personal life ==
Duncan Smith was given his mother's maiden name (Duncan) as a middle name—a fairly conventional practice of the Edwardian period—but his father's name was "Smith", not "Duncan Smith" and, in Second World War RAF records, Duncan Smith himself is always listed as W. G. G. D. Smith, not W.G.G. Duncan Smith. It is not known precisely when he started using his mother's maiden name as part of his surname but he decided to pass the name to his children. Whether this makes the current family surname "Duncan Smith" or still "Smith" is a moot point.

His second wife, Pamela Summers (whom he married in 1946) was a ballet dancer who was born in Nanking, China where her father was a commissioner in the Chinese Postal Service. Her maternal grandmother was Ellen Oshey Matsumuro, a Japanese woman whose father was a Japanese artist. Their son Iain Duncan Smith is a politician who was leader of the Conservative Party from September 2001 to November 2003 and Secretary of State for Work and Pensions in the Coalition government of 2010. In his office hangs a portrait of Adam Duncan, the admiral who defeated the Dutch Navy at the Battle of Camperdown in 1797. It is, however, very unlikely that W. G. G. D. Smith's mother was a legitimate descendant of Admiral Duncan.

== Honours and awards ==
- 22 July 1941 – Pilot Officer Wilfrid George Gerald Duncan Smith (85684), No. 611 Squadron is appointed a Distinguished Flying Cross:

This officer has participated in many operational flights over enemy territory and has always displayed the utmost keenness to engage the enemy. During recent operations, Pilot Officer Smith has destroyed at least three hostile aircraft.

- 26 December 1941 – Acting Flight Lieutenant W.G.G.D. Smith DFC (85684), No. 603 Squadron is awarded Bar to Distinguished Flying Cross:

During 1941, this officer has carried out 190 operational patrols, 98 of which have been over enemy territory. By his skill, coolness and strong sense of duty, Flight Lieutenant Smith has set a splendid example to all. He has always devoted himself unselfishly to the success of his squadron thereby contributing materially to its achievements. Flight Lieutenant Smith has destroyed at least 5 enemy aircraft.

- 11 September 1942 – Squadron Leader W.G.G.D. Smith DFC (85684), No. 64 Squadron is awarded the Distinguished Service Order:

Since being awarded a Bar to the Distinguished Flying Cross, this officer has completed a great number of sorties. He is a brilliant pilot and a fine leader whose skill has proved a source of inspiration to all. Squadron Leader Smith has destroyed 10 and probably destroyed several other enemy aircraft.

- 20 March 1945 – Acting Group Captain W.G.G.D. Smith DSO, DFC (85684) is awarded a Bar to the Distinguished Service Order:
- He was awarded the Air Efficiency Award (AE) for 10 years of service in the Royal Air Force Volunteer Reserve.

== Sources ==
- Price, Dr. Alfred. Spitfire Mark V Aces 1941 – 1945. London: Osprey Publishing, 1997. ISBN 978-1-85532-635-4.
- Price, Dr. Alfred. Spitfire Mark I/II Aces 1939 – 41. London: Osprey Publishing, 1996. ISBN 978-1-85532-627-9
