= Proofing =

Proofing may refer to:

- Proofing (armour), the testing of armour for its defensive ability
- Proofing (baking technique), a rest period during the fermentation of bread dough
- Proofing (prepress), a concept in print production
- Proof testing, a form of stress test to demonstrate the fitness of a load-bearing structure

== See also ==
- Proof (disambiguation)
- The Proof (disambiguation)
- Bulletproofing, provision for resisting fired bullets
- Fireproofing, provision for resisting fire
- Waterproofing, provision for resisting water
