= Drain (punk band) =

American hardcore punk band

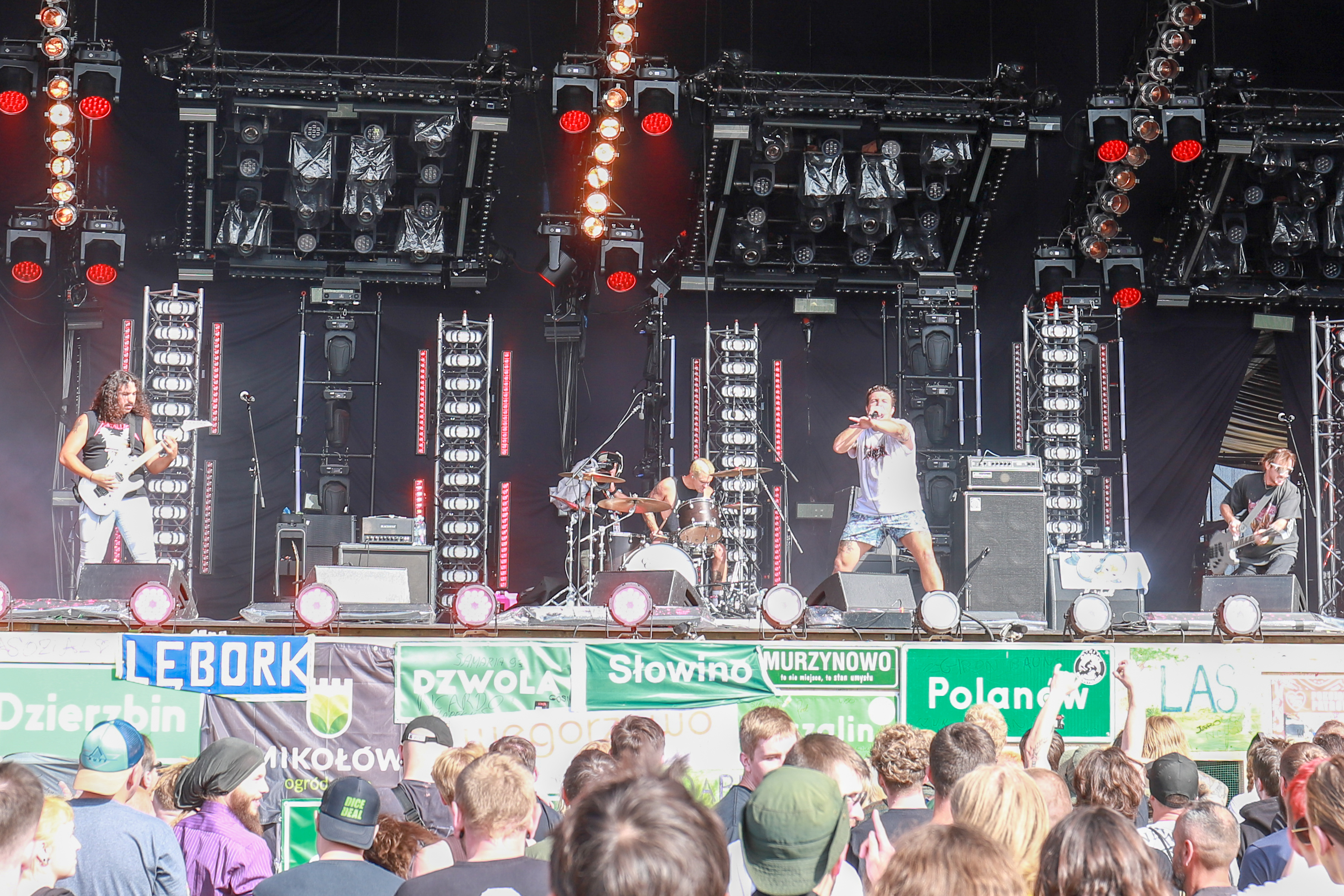
- Drain performing at Pol'and'Rock Festival in 2023

Background information
- Origin: Santa Cruz, California, U.S.
- Genres: Hardcore punk; crossover thrash
- Years active: 2014–present
- Labels: Epitaph; Revelation; Wide Eyed Noise
- Spinoffs: Gulch, Dead Heat
- Members: Sammy Ciaramitaro; Tim Flegal; Cody Chavez; Greg Cerwonka
- Past members: Aric Gibson; Patrick Delaney; Josh Nunes; Parker McClellan; Justin Rhode; Mike Durrett; AJ Hoenings; Sam Jameson
- Website: drain831.com

Drain, stylized as DRAIN, is an American hardcore punk band formed in Santa Cruz, California, in 2014. Beginning without a set musical style, the 2015 hiring of vocalist Sammy Ciaramitaro and bassist-turned-guitarist Cody Chavez led the band to embrace a crossover thrash sound. They have released two demos, two EPs and three full-length albums. The New York Times credited Drain as a driving force of American hardcore's "renaissance" in the early 2020s.

== History ==
Drain was formed in 2014, by drummer Tim Flegal and a number of other students at the University of California, Santa Cruz who played a variety of different music styles. This lineup had fractured by 2015, leading to Sammy Ciaramitaro and Cody Chavez joining the band on vocals and bass, respectively. This introduction led to the band's sound becoming increasingly indebted to hardcore punk. Soon after, Chavez instead became the band's guitarist. In 2016, they released their debut EP Over Thinking, which was followed the next year by the Time Enough at Last EP. The band performed at Sound and Fury festival 2019, which caught the attention of Revelation Records, who soon signed the band. On February 10, 2020 they announced their debut full-length album California Cursed, and released the single "Sick One". The album was subsequently released on April 10, 2020. On June 19, 2021, the band performed at a guerrilla-style show which around 2000 people attended in San Jose alongside Sunami, Gulch, Scowl, Xibalba and Maya Over Eyes. On August 25, 2021, they released the single "Watch You Burn". At the beginning of 2023, they toured Australia supporting Comeback Kid. On February 7, 2023, they announced the release of their second album Living Proof and released the single "Evil Finds Light". The following day the released a music video for the single. From May 25 to June 24, they headlined a US tour. Between August 3 and 19, they headlined a European tour.

In June 2025, Drain announced a new album, ...Is Your Friend, which released on November 7, 2025. On the same year, Living Proof was featured on the soundtrack of the sports video game Tony Hawk’s Pro Skater 3+4.

== Musical style ==
Critics have categorized Drain's music as hardcore punk, crossover thrash and metalcore; they frequently blend elements of punk rock and thrash metal. Tom Breiham of Stereogum described their style as "old-school California fight music, with a generous whiff of ’80s thrash-metal". Exclaim! writer Connor Atkinson, meanwhile, opined that "the band's sound is both old and new—the tough street grit of New York hardcore paired with the tasteful gloss of '80s thrash metal". Bandcamp Daily writer David Anthony deemed the band "surf-thrash". The band have cited several 1980s thrash acts as influences: Dark Angel, Exhorder, Slayer, Vio-lence and Testament. Other influences include California hardcore groups such as Black Flag and Blast. Drain embraces a more positive and upbeat image than many of their hardcore contemporaries, with Kerrang! attributing this to vocalist Sammy Ciaramitaro's "non-threatening look and...Golden Retriever energy".

== Members ==
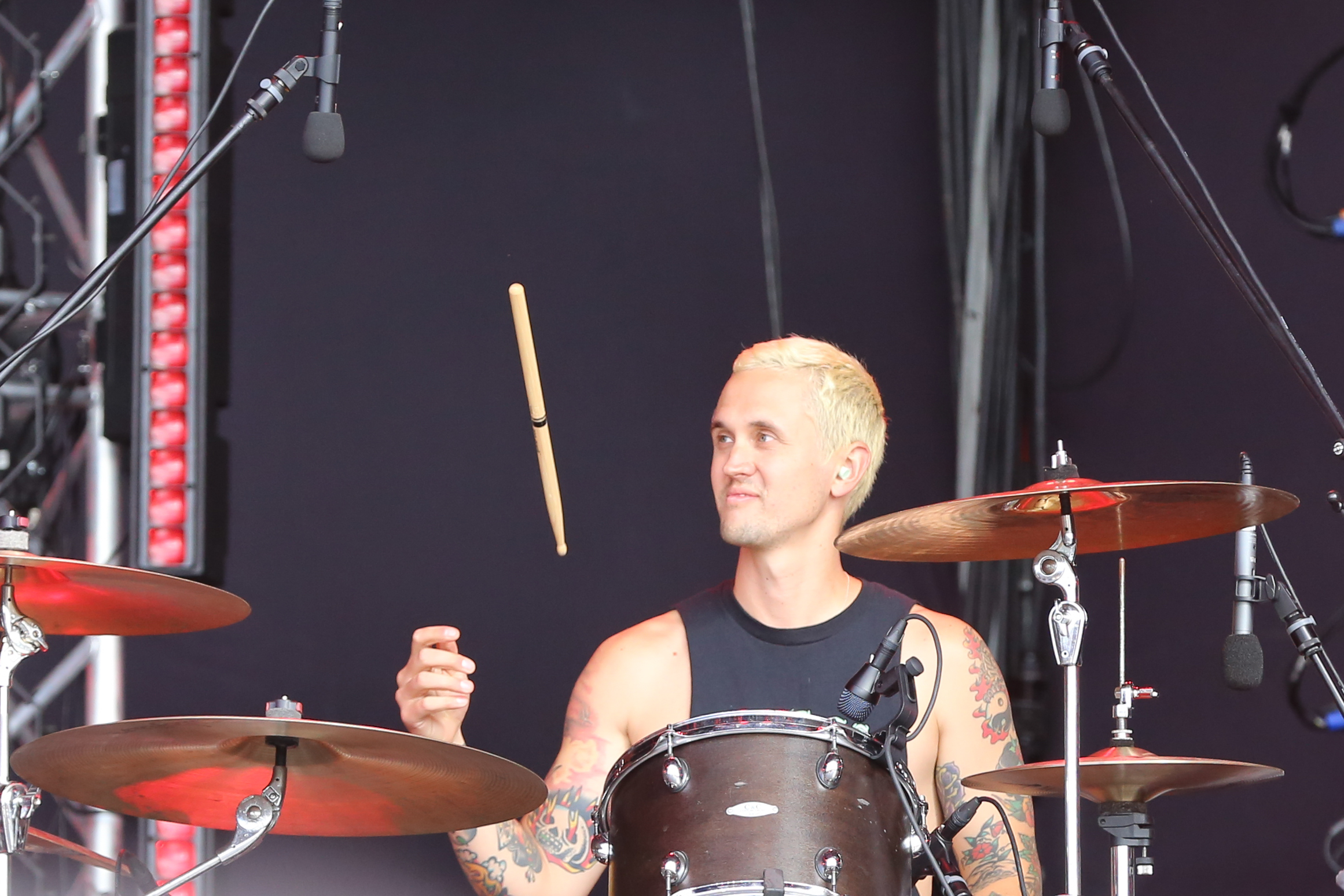
Tim Flegal

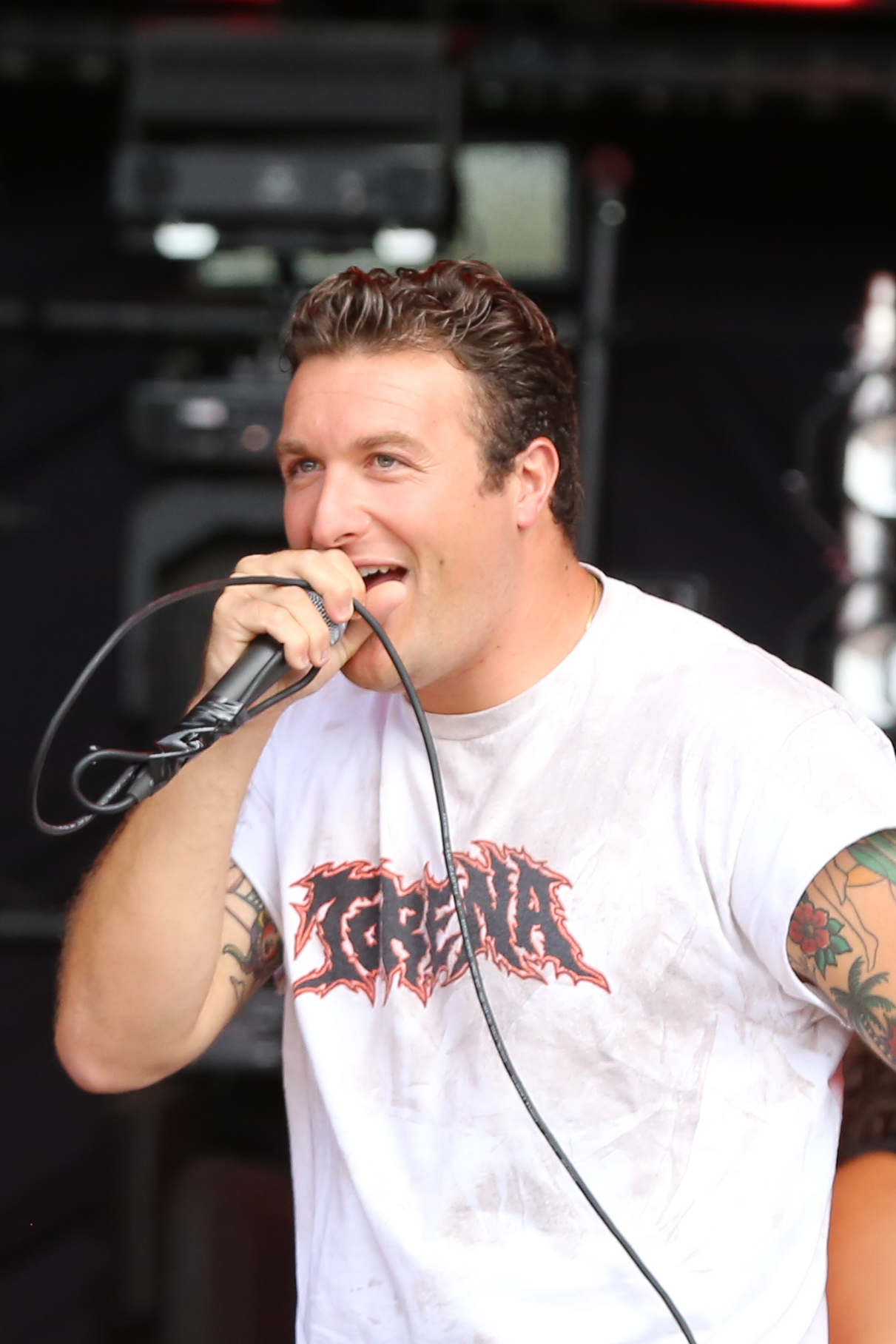
Sammy Ciaramitaro

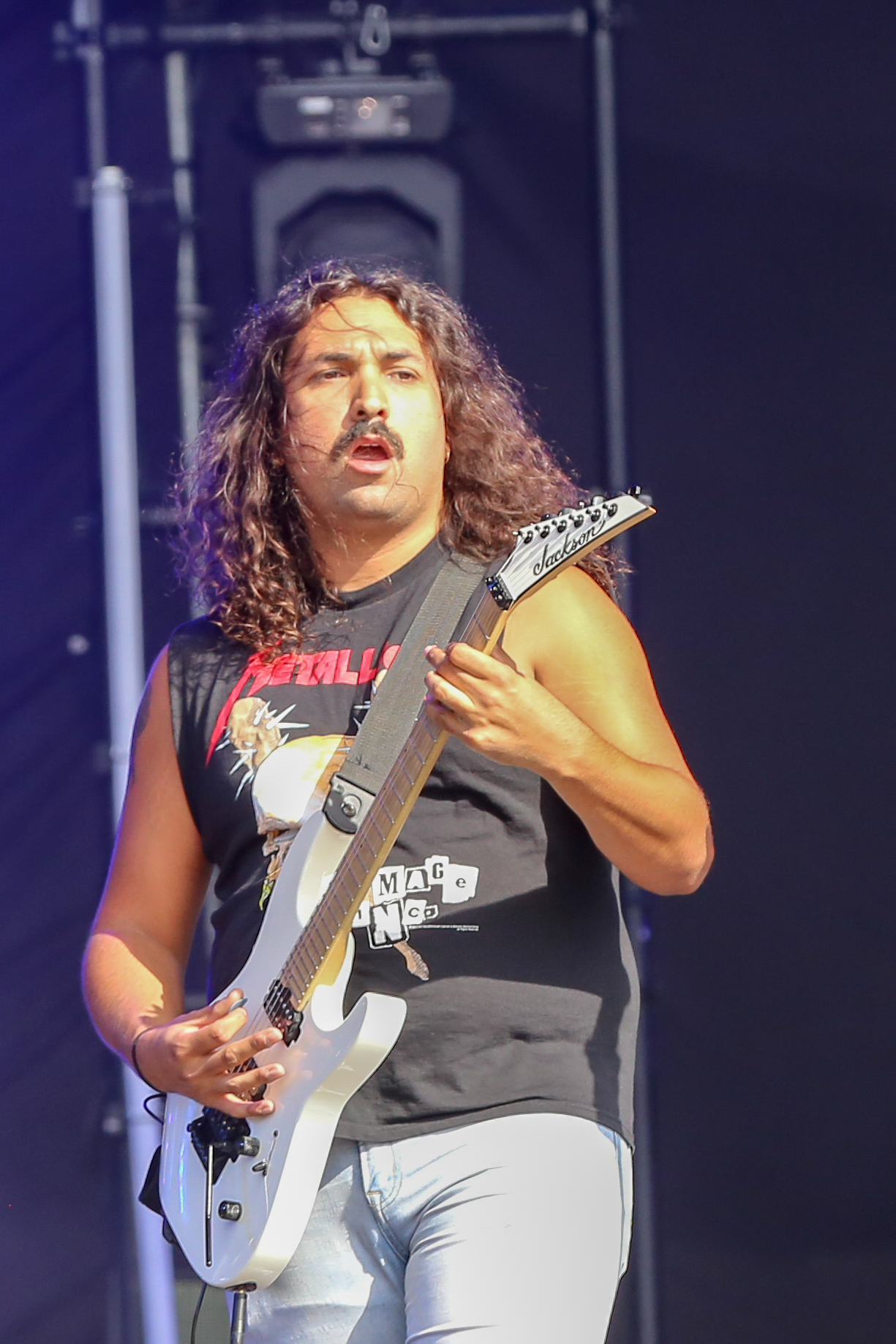
Cody Chavez
- Tim Flegal – drums (2014–present)
- Sammy Ciaramitaro – vocals (2015–present)
- Cody Chavez – guitars (2016–present), bass (2016)
- Greg Cerwonka – bass (2026-present, touring 2025–2026)

Former

- Aric Gibson – bass (2014–2016)
- Patrick Delaney – guitars (2014–2016)
- Josh Nunes – guitars (2014–2016)
- Parker McClellan – guitars (2016–2017)
- Justin Rhode – bass (2016–2020)
- Mike "Durt" Durrett – bass (2020–2022)
- AJ Hoenings – bass (2022)
- Sam Jameson – bass (2023–2025)

Timeline

== Discography ==
Albums

- California Cursed (2020)
- Living Proof (2023)
- ...Is Your Friend (2025)

EPs

- Over Thinking (2016)
- Time Enough at Last (2017)

Demos

- Demo '15 (2015)
- Swan Songs (2015)

Singles

- Watch You Burn (2021)
