= Provable =

Provability or provable (and disprovability or disprovable) may refer to:

- Provability logic, a modal logic
- Provable prime, an integer that has been calculated to be prime
- Provable security, computer system security that can be proved
- Provably correct, correctness of an algorithm that can be proved
- Provably total, function that can be proven to be computable

== See also ==
- Proof (disambiguation)
- Proof theory, a branch of mathematical logic
- Recursively enumerable set, also known as provable set
- Falsifiability
