= Foolproof =

Foolproof may refer to:

- Foolproof or idiot-proof, an assurance, meaning a device that can't be damaged by improper use
- Foolproof (film), a 2003 Canadian heist film
- "Foolproof" (Desert Dolphins song), 1996
- "Foolproof" (Hayden James, Gorgon City and Nat Dunn song), 2021
- FoolProof, a financial education initiative
- Foolproof (book), a 2023 book by Sander van der Linden
