= Iain Duncan Smith =

British politician (born 1954)

The Right Honourable Sir Iain Duncan Smith MP
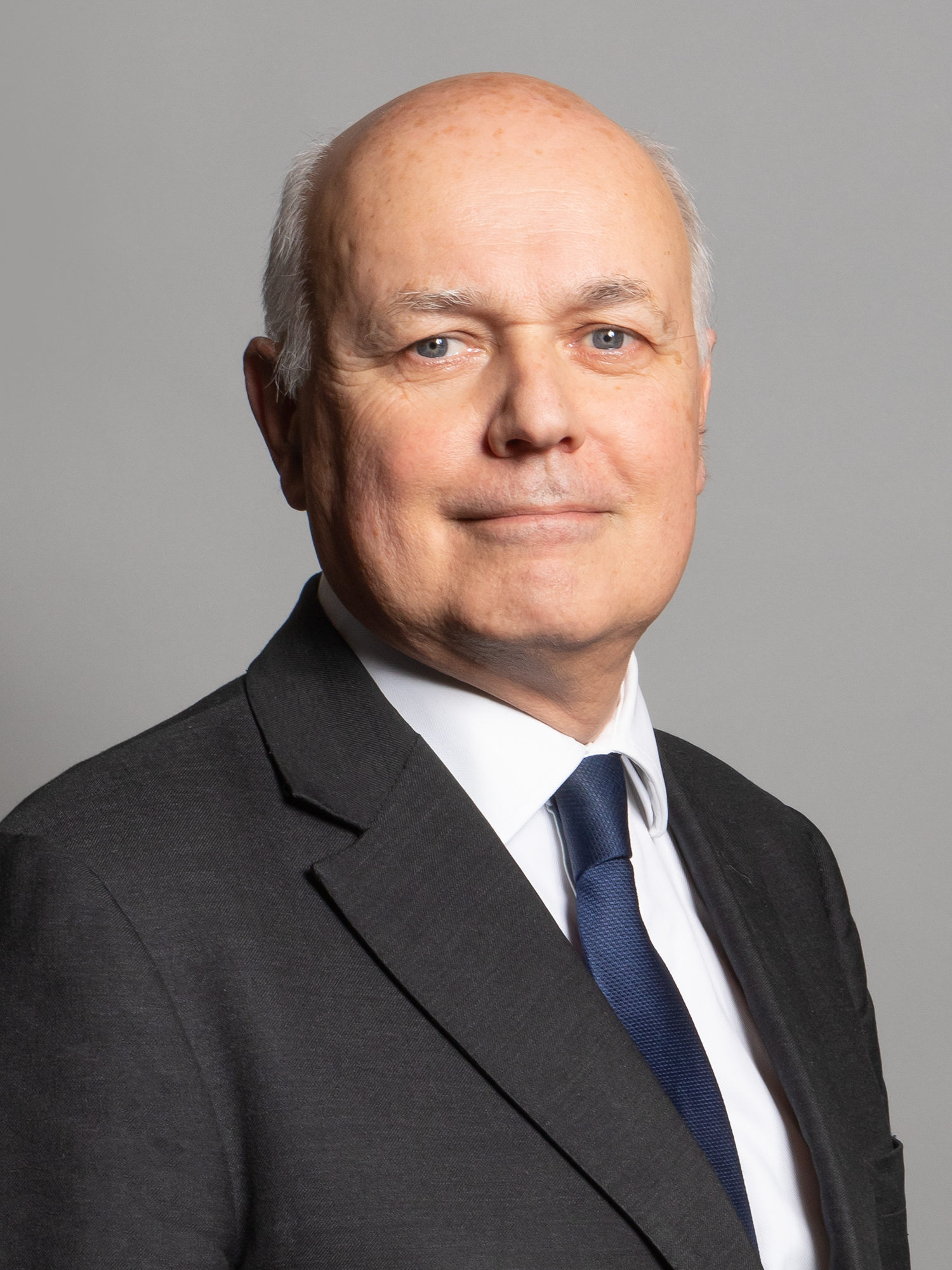
- Official portrait, 2020

Leader of the Opposition
- In office 13 September 2001 – 6 November 2003
- Monarch: Elizabeth II
- Prime Minister: Tony Blair
- Deputy: Michael Ancram
- Preceded by: William Hague
- Succeeded by: Michael Howard

Leader of the Conservative Party
- In office 13 September 2001 – 6 November 2003
- Deputy: Michael Ancram
- Preceded by: William Hague
- Succeeded by: Michael Howard

Secretary of State for Work and Pensions
- In office 12 May 2010 – 18 March 2016
- Prime Minister: David Cameron
- Preceded by: Yvette Cooper
- Succeeded by: Stephen Crabb

Chair of the Social Justice Policy Group
- Incumbent
- Assumed office 12 September 2016
- Preceded by: Rory Brooks
- In office 7 December 2005 – 12 May 2010
- Preceded by: Office established
- Succeeded by: Mark Florman

Member of Parliament for Chingford and Woodford Green Chingford (1992–1997)
- Incumbent
- Assumed office 9 April 1992
- Preceded by: Norman Tebbit
- Majority: 4,758 (9.8%)

Shadow cabinet portfolios
- 1997–1999: Social Security
- 1999–2001: Defence

Personal details
- Born: George Ian Duncan Smith; 9 April 1954 (age 72) Edinburgh, Scotland
- Party: Conservative
- Spouse: Betsy Fremantle (m. 1982)
- Children: 4
- Education: Royal Military Academy Sandhurst
- Nickname: IDS

Military service
- Branch/service: British Army
- Years of service: 1975–1981
- Rank: Lieutenant
- Unit: Scots Guards
- Battles/wars: The Troubles
- Iain Duncan Smith's voice Duncan Smith outlines the government's plans for welfare reform as Work and Pensions Secretary; Recorded 1 June 2010

Sir George Iain Duncan Smith (born 9 April 1954), often referred to by his initials IDS, is a British politician who was Leader of the Conservative Party and Leader of the Opposition from 2001 to 2003. He was Secretary of State for Work and Pensions from 2010 to 2016. He has been Member of Parliament (MP) for Chingford and Woodford Green, formerly Chingford, since 1992.

The son of W. G. G. Duncan Smith, a Royal Air Force flying-ace, Duncan Smith was born in Edinburgh and raised in Solihull. After education at the training school HMS Conway and the Royal Military Academy Sandhurst, he served in the Scots Guards from 1975 to 1981, seeing tours in Northern Ireland and in Rhodesia. He joined the Conservative Party in 1981. After unsuccessfully contesting Bradford West in 1987, he was elected to Parliament at the 1992 general election. He was a backbencher during the premiership of John Major (in office from 1990 to 1997). In the shadow cabinet of William Hague, Duncan Smith served as Shadow Secretary of State for Social Security between 1997 and 1998, and as Shadow Secretary of State for Defence from 1998 to 2001.

Following the resignation of William Hague, Duncan Smith won election as Conservative Party leader in 2001, partly owing to the support of Margaret Thatcher for his Eurosceptic beliefs. However, many Conservative MPs came to consider him incapable of winning the next general election, and in 2003 he lost a vote of confidence in his leadership; he immediately resigned and was succeeded by Michael Howard. Returning to the backbenches, Duncan Smith founded the Centre for Social Justice, a centre-right think-tank independent of the Conservative Party, and became chair of its Social Justice Policy Group.

In May 2010, new Prime Minister David Cameron appointed him to serve in the cabinet as Secretary of State for Work and Pensions. During his tenure he had responsibility for seeing through changes to the welfare state. He resigned from the cabinet in March 2016 in opposition to Chancellor George Osborne's proposed cuts to disability benefits, and returned to the backbenches, where he remains.

== Early life, military service and professional career ==
Duncan Smith was born George Ian Duncan Smith on 9 April 1954 in Edinburgh. A second "i" was added to his middle name "Ian" later in life, with several explanations given: Duncan Smith changed it himself to prove that he was committed to Scotland; the person who filled in his birth certificate made a mistake; Duncan Smith's mother registered him, but Duncan Smith's patriotic father later suggested to his son to change it to the Scottish spelling, even though both "Ian" and "Iain" are Scottish names - the equivalent of the English "John".

He is the son of Wilfrid George Gerald "W. G. G." Duncan Smith, a decorated Royal Air Force flying ace of the Second World War, and Pamela Summers, a ballerina. His parents married in 1946.

One of his maternal great-grandmothers was Ellen Oshey Matsumuro, a Japanese woman, from a Samurai family, living in Beijing who married Pamela's maternal grandfather, Irish merchant seaman Captain Samuel Lewis Shaw. Through Ellen and Samuel, Duncan Smith is related to Canadian CBC wartime broadcaster Peter Stursberg (whose book No Foreign Bones in China records their story) and his son, former CBC vice-president Richard Stursberg.

Duncan Smith was educated at Bishop Glancey Secondary Modern School, until the age of 14, and then at HMS Conway, a merchant navy training school on the Isle of Anglesey, until he was 18. There, he played rugby union in the position of fly-half alongside Clive Woodward at centre.

In 1973, he spent a year studying at the University for Foreigners in Perugia, Italy, but did not complete his studies and did not gain any qualifications. He then attended the Royal Military Academy Sandhurst and was commissioned into the Scots Guards as a second lieutenant on 28 June 1975, with the service number 500263. He was promoted to lieutenant in the Scots Guards on 28 June 1977. During his service, he served in Northern Ireland and Southern Rhodesia (now Zimbabwe), where he was aide-de-camp to Major-General Sir John Acland, commander of the Commonwealth Monitoring Force monitoring the ceasefire during elections.

Duncan Smith worked for GEC Marconi in the 1980s and attended short courses at the company's staff college in Dunchurch. He did not gain any qualifications at Dunchurch and completed six separate courses lasting a few days each, adding up to roughly a month in total. Nevertheless, until exposed by the BBC's Newsnight programme, Smith declared on the Conservative Party website and in his Who's Who entry, that he had attended the University of Perugia and the "Dunchurch College of Management".

== Early parliamentary career ==
At the 1987 general election Duncan Smith contested the constituency of Bradford West, where the incumbent Labour Party MP Max Madden retained his seat. At the 1992 general election, Duncan Smith stood in the London constituency of Chingford, a safe Conservative seat, following the retirement of Conservative MP Norman Tebbit. He became a member of the House of Commons with a majority of 14,938. A committed Eurosceptic, he became a constant thorn in the side of Prime Minister John Major's government of 1992 to 1997, opposing Major's pro-European agenda at the time. This was something that would often be raised during his own subsequent leadership when he called for the party to unite behind him.

Duncan Smith remained on the backbenches until 1997, when the new Conservative leader William Hague brought him into the Shadow cabinet as Shadow Secretary of State for Social Security, the former version of the Department for Work and Pensions which he would later lead. At the 1997 general election, boundary changes saw his constituency renamed Chingford and Woodford Green and his majority of 14,938 was reduced to 5,714. Duncan Smith realised the dangers that he and neighbouring Conservative MPs faced, so redoubled his efforts: "We spent the final week of the campaign working my seat as if it was [were] a marginal. I held on but everywhere around me went." In 1999, Duncan Smith replaced John Maples as Shadow Secretary of State for Defence.

== Leader of the Conservative Party ==
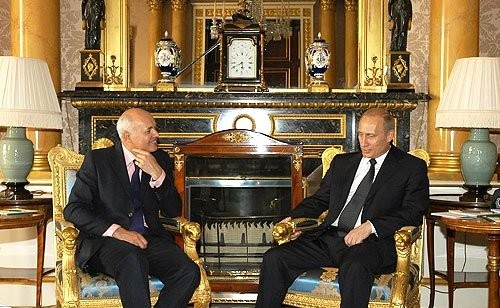
Duncan Smith with Russian President Vladimir Putin in June 2003

William Hague resigned after the Labour Party continued in government with another large parliamentary majority following the 2001 general election. In September 2001, Duncan Smith was the successful candidate in the Conservative leadership election. Although he was initially viewed as an outsider, his campaign was bolstered when Margaret Thatcher publicly gave her support for him. His victory in the contest was helped by the fact that his opponent in the final vote of party members was Kenneth Clarke, whose strong support for the European Union was at odds with the views of much of the party.

In the 2002 local elections, the first of two elections in which Duncan Smith led the party, the Conservatives gained 238 extra seats on local councils, primarily in England. The 2002 Conservative Party conference saw an attempt to turn Duncan Smith's lack of charisma into a positive attribute, with his much-quoted line, "do not underestimate the determination of a quiet man".

Amid speculation that rebel MPs were seeking to undermine him, Duncan Smith called on the party to "Unite or die." On 23 February 2003, The Independent on Sunday newspaper published an article saying that 14 MPs were prepared to sign a petition for a vote of confidence in Duncan Smith (25 signatories were then needed) for a vote on his removal as leader. Duncan Smith's 2003 conference speech favoured an aggressive hard-man approach which received several ovations from party members in the hall. "The quiet man is here to stay, and he's turning up the volume", Duncan Smith said.

In the 2003 local elections, the Conservatives gained 566 seats. Despite the gains made, Shadow Secretary of State for Trade and Industry Crispin Blunt resigned. He called Duncan Smith's leadership a "handicap" as he had "failed to make the necessary impact on the electorate", and said that he should be replaced. These worries came to a head in October 2003 when journalist Michael Crick revealed he had compiled embarrassing evidence of dubious salary claims Duncan Smith made on behalf of his wife that were paid out of the public purse from September 2001 to December 2002. The ensuing scandal, known as "Betsygate", weakened his already tenuous position.

=== Vote of confidence ===
Following months of speculation over a leadership challenge, Duncan Smith called upon critics within his party to either gather enough support to trigger a vote of confidence in him or get behind him. A vote of confidence was called on Wednesday 29 October 2003, which Duncan Smith lost by 90 votes to 75. He stepped down eight days later on 6 November, with Michael Howard being confirmed as his successor. Duncan Smith became the first Conservative leader who did not lead his party in a general election campaign since Neville Chamberlain.

== Return to the backbenches ==
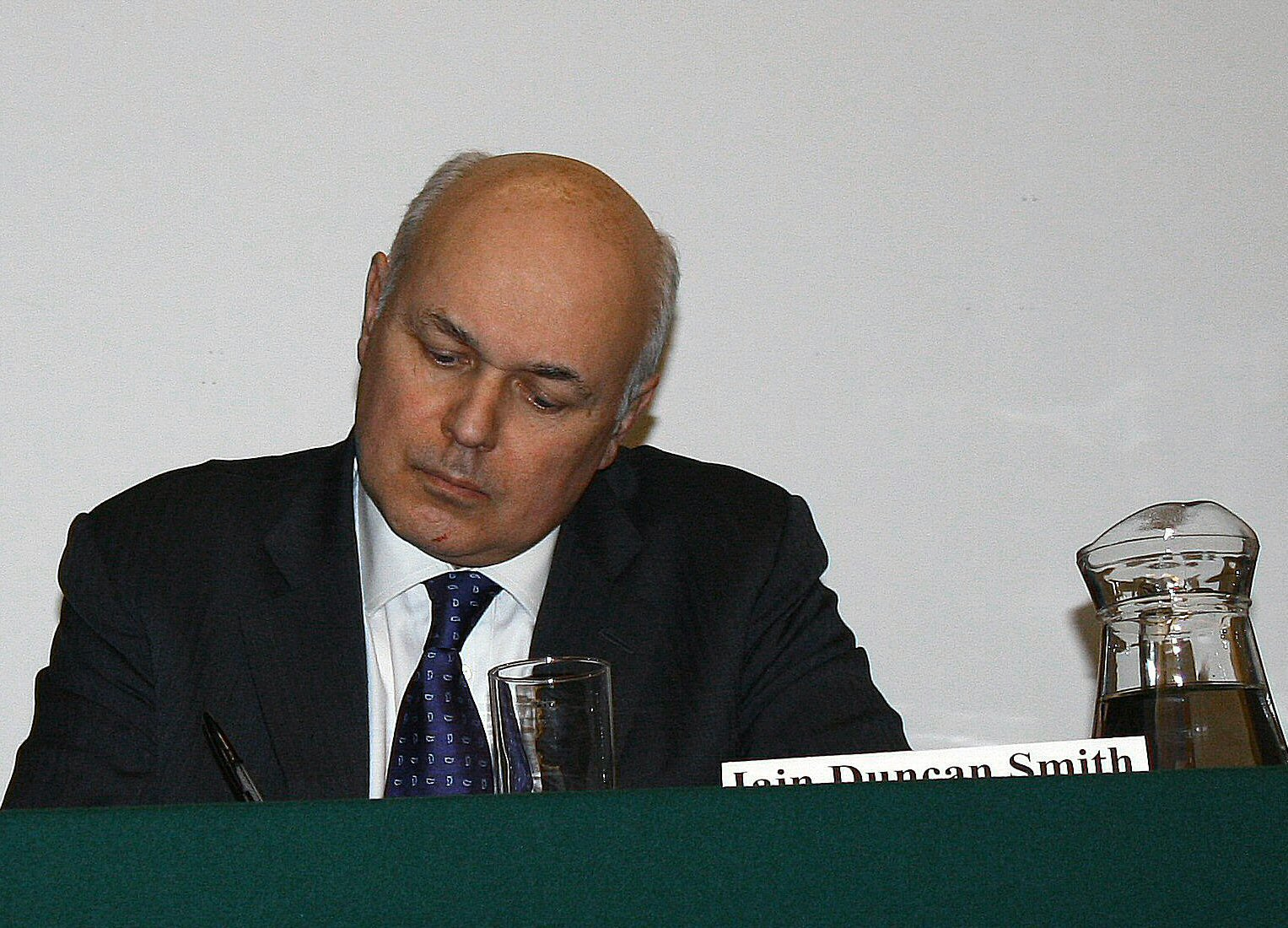
Duncan Smith at Nightingale House, London, in March 2010 in his role as Chair of the Social Justice Policy Group

The same week as Michael Howard succeeded him, Duncan Smith's novel The Devil's Tune was released to negative critical reception. In November 2003, he was appointed by Howard to the Conservative Party's advisory council, along with John Major, William Hague and Kenneth Clarke.

In 2004, Duncan Smith established the Centre for Social Justice, a centre-right think tank working with small charities with the aim of finding innovative policies for tackling poverty. On 7 December 2005, he was appointed Chairman of the Social Justice Policy Group, which was facilitated by the Centre for Social Justice. His deputy chair was Debbie Scott, the Chief Executive of the charity Tomorrow's People. The group released two major reports, Breakdown Britain and Breakthrough Britain. Breakdown Britain was a 300,000 word document that analysed what was going wrong in the areas of economic dependence and unemployment, family breakdown, addiction, educational failure, indebtedness, and the voluntary sector. Breakthrough Britain recommended almost two hundred policy ideas using broadly the same themes.

Duncan Smith was re-elected comfortably in Chingford and Woodford Green at the 2005 general election, almost doubling his majority, from 5,487 to 10,641. In September 2006, he was one of fourteen authors of a report concerning antisemitism in Britain. He was also one of the only early supporters of the Iraq troop surge policy in 2007.

== Secretary of State for Work and Pensions ==
Following the 2010 general election, Duncan Smith was appointed by Prime Minister David Cameron as Secretary of State for Work and Pensions in the Cameron–Clegg coalition. Under his leadership, the Department for Work and Pensions (DWP) rolled out Universal Credit and a new Work Programme, as well as implemented a real terms cut in benefits. He also looked at "how to make it harder for sick and disabled people to claim benefits" by giving DWP staff more powers to conduct benefit eligibility tests and to strip benefits from claimants with serious but time-limited health conditions. Duncan Smith was advised it would be illegal to introduce legislation not requiring parliamentary approval. The DWP was criticised by Oxfam and Justin Welby for rises in food poverty. Duncan Smith himself was criticised by the UK Statistics Authority and National Institute of Economic and Social Research for breaking the Code of Practice for Official Statistics.

=== Cameron–Clegg coalition ===
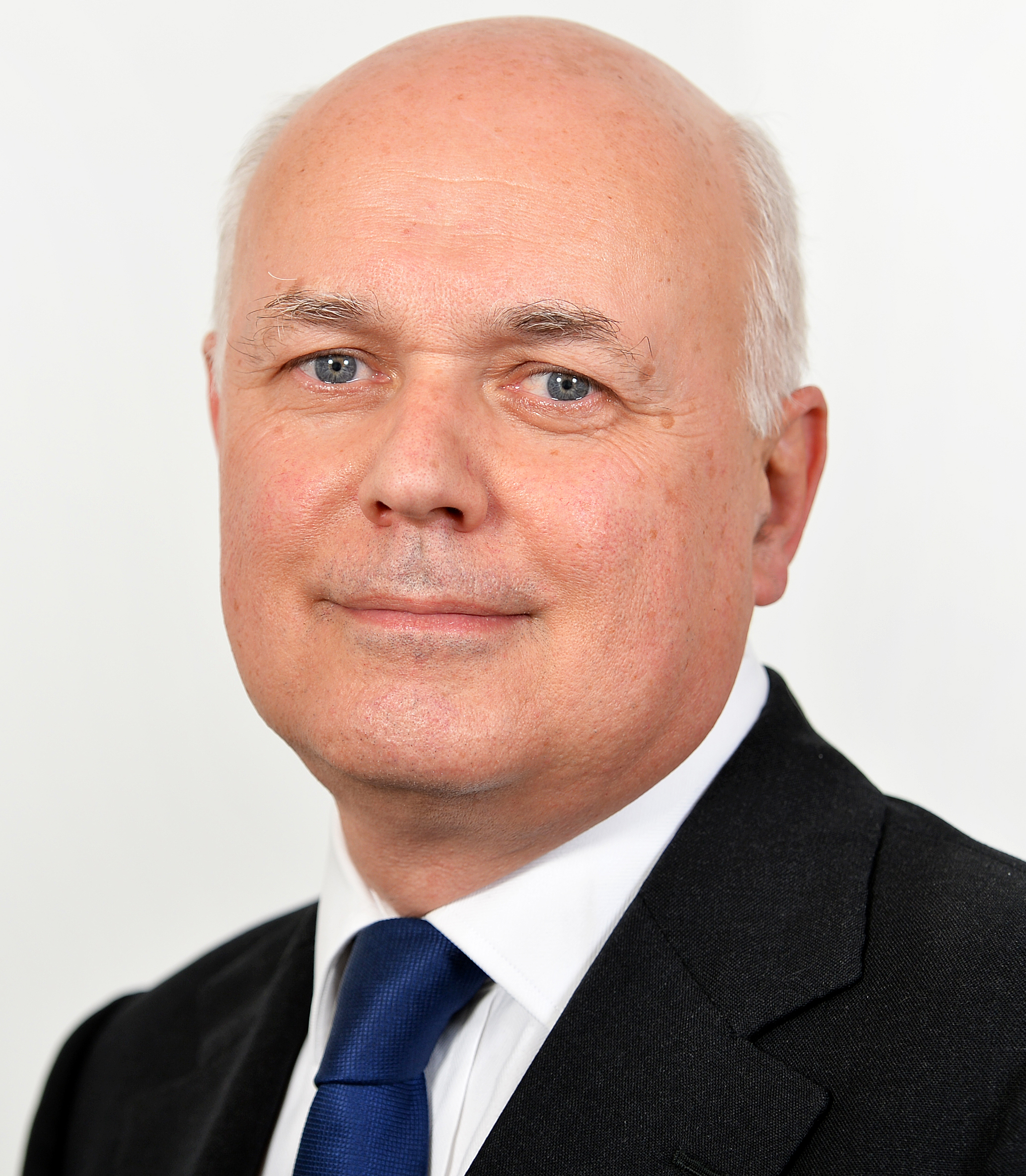
Duncan Smith in 2015

Shortly after being appointed, Duncan Smith said the government would encourage people to work for longer by making it illegal for companies to force staff to give up work at 65 and bringing forward the planned rises in the state pension age. He announced reforms to simplify benefits and tax credits into a single Universal Credit payment, arguing welfare reform would make low earners better off in employment. He promised targeted work activity, sanctions and possible removal of benefits for up to three years for those who refused to work. Benefits claimants with part-time incomes below a certain threshold would become required to search for additional work or risk losing access to their benefits. He said benefits were not a route out of child poverty but hundreds of thousands of children could be lifted out of child poverty if one of their parents were to work at least a 35-hour week at the national minimum wage.

In June 2011, Duncan Smith announced welfare-to-work programmes would be replaced with a single Work Programme, which included incentives for private sector service providers to help the unemployed find long term employment. The DWP announced on the 2012 United Nations' International Day of Persons with Disabilities that there would be forced work for disabled people who received welfare benefits, in order to "improve disabled people's chances of getting work by mandatory employment". In the 2012 Cabinet reshuffle, Duncan Smith was offered the job at the Ministry of Justice replacing Kenneth Clarke, but declined, and remained in his post at the DWP.

In April 2013, Duncan Smith said he could live on £53 per week as Work and Pensions Secretary, after a benefits claimant told the BBC he had £53 per week after housing costs. Also in April, he called for wealthier people to voluntarily return universal winter fuel payments to help reduce the strain on public finances, prompting some wealthier pensioners to state they had already tried this but had their offers refused because there was no mechanism for returning payments. In the same month, the DWP was subject to an "excoriating" National Audit Office report, accusing the DWP of having "weak management, ineffective control and poor governance" and of wasting £34 million on inadequate computer systems. Duncan Smith dismissed allegations in Matthew d'Ancona's 2013 book In It Together that the Chancellor George Osborne had referred to him as "just not clever enough". The allegations were also denied by Osborne.

In May 2014, it was reported the DWP was employing debt collectors to retrieve overpaid benefits, the overpayment purely down to calculation mistakes by HM Revenue and Customs. After the "workfare" element of the Work Programme was successfully challenged in the courts in 2013, Duncan Smith sought to re-establish the legality of the scheme through retrospective legislation but, in July 2014, the High Court ruled the retrospective nature of the legislation interfered with the "right to a fair trial" under Article 6 of the European Convention on Human Rights. The DWP had said 1 million people would be placed on the new Universal Credit benefits system by April 2014, yet by October 2014 only 15,000 were assigned to UC. Duncan Smith said a final delivery date would not be set for this, declaring "Arbitrary dates and deadlines are the enemy of secure delivery."

=== Cameron majority government ===
In August 2015, Duncan Smith was criticised after the DWP admitted publishing fake testimonies of claimants enjoying their benefits cuts. Later the same month, publication of statistics showed 2,380 people died in a 3-year period shortly after a work capability assessment declared them fit for work. This led to Jeremy Corbyn calling for Duncan Smith's resignation. At the 2015 Conservative Party conference, Duncan Smith said to the sick and disabled "With our help, you'll work your way out of poverty" while criticising the current system, which he said "makes doctors ask a simplistic question: are you too sick to work at all? If the answer is yes, they're signed off work – perhaps for ever."

In March 2016, Duncan Smith unexpectedly resigned from the Cabinet. He stated that he was unable to accept the government's planned cuts to disability benefits. He later launched an attack on the "government's austerity programme for balancing the books on the backs of the poor and vulnerable", describing this as divisive and "deeply unfair", and adding: "It is in danger of drifting in a direction that divides society rather than unites it."

== Later backbench career ==
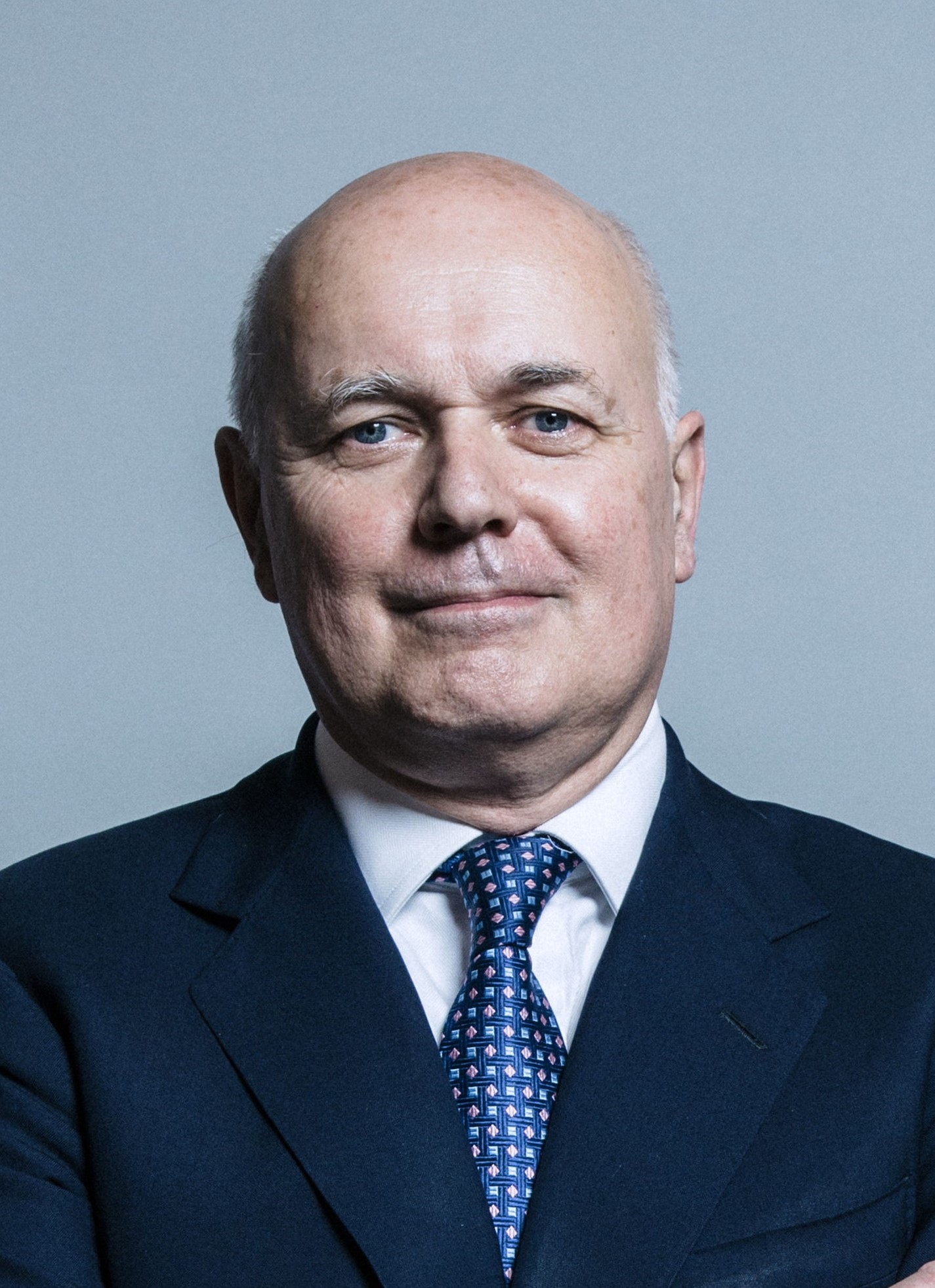
Duncan Smith in 2017

In the 2016 EU membership referendum, Duncan Smith campaigned to leave the EU working with the Vote Leave campaign, stating that staying in the EU "leaves the door open" to the UK enduring terrorist attacks. While he had opposed David Cameron over the referendum, sources close to Duncan Smith said his resignation as Work and Pensions Secretary was not about Europe.

In the 2019 Conservative leadership election, Duncan Smith served as chairman for Boris Johnson's leadership campaign, resulting in an emphatic win, with over 50% of MPs and 66% of the Conservative membership voting for Johnson to become the next Leader of the Conservative Party and Prime Minister. He was knighted in the 2020 New Year Honours, for political and public service. The honour sparked criticism, with more than 237,000 people signing an online petition, set up by Labour Party activist Dr Mona Kamal Ahmed, a National Health Service psychiatrist, demanding that it be rescinded.

In June 2020, Duncan Smith launched the Inter-Parliamentary Alliance on China, becoming the co-chair of the alliance in the UK with Labour peer, Helena Kennedy. The alliance seeks to "promote a coordinated response between democratic states to challenges posed by the present conduct and future ambitions of the People's Republic of China. By developing a common set of principles and frameworks that transcend domestic party divisions and international borders, our democracies will be able to keep the rules-based and human rights systems true to their founding purposes." In a launch message, Duncan Smith explained, "This challenge will outlast governments and administrations and it transcends party politics."

On 26 March 2021, it was announced that Duncan Smith was one of five MPs to be sanctioned by the Chinese government for spreading what it called "lies and disinformation" about the country. He was subsequently banned from entering China, Hong Kong and Macau and Chinese citizens and institutions became prohibited from doing business with him. The sanctions were condemned by the Prime Minister and led the Foreign Secretary to summon the Chinese ambassador. The sanctions were lifted on 30 January 2026 during a visit by Prime Minister Keir Starmer to China.

Following an incident in October 2021 in Manchester outside a Conservative Party Conference where Duncan Smith had a traffic cone put on his head and verbally harangued, in November 2022 a man had one charge of assault dismissed with "no case to answer" and two others were found not guilty of using threatening, abusive or insulting words or behaviour with intent. Duncan Smith sought to overturn the acquittal, seeking to retry the defendants for using what he called an "appallingly abusive piece of language" - the phrase "Tory scum" - but was rejected by the high court, which agreed with the original ruling that the phrase had been used "to highlight the policies" of Duncan Smith and that this was "reasonable" in relation to the rights of freedom of expression.

Following the Liberal Democrats' victory in the North Shropshire by-election, Duncan Smith stated the government had lost focus due to stories about Downing Street parties where COVID-19 rules were broken. Duncan Smith stated, "The prime minister needs to show really strongly that he doesn't just disapprove but is prepared to get rid of people who are breaking those rules."

In July 2022, Duncan Smith announced his support for Liz Truss in the July–September 2022 Conservative Party leadership election because she had done more than her opponents to "deliver the benefits of Brexit". Following Truss's appointment as leader of the Conservative Party, Duncan Smith called on his colleagues to "unite" behind Truss or risk losing the next election.

In September 2022, Duncan Smith declined an offer to serve in Liz Truss's cabinet. After Tom Tugendhat was chosen as Minister of State for Security, Duncan Smith announced he was considering seeking the Chairmanship of the Foreign Affairs Select Committee.

In September 2022, Duncan Smith joined a number of senior Conservative Party members in calling for the Chinese government's invitation to the Queen's funeral to be withdrawn.

Duncan Smith endorsed Rishi Sunak in the October 2022 Conservative Party leadership election.

At the 2024 general election, Duncan Smith was again re-elected, with a decreased vote share of 35.6% and an increased majority of 4,758.

== Political views ==
=== Views on gay rights and marriage ===
During his leadership campaign in 2001, Duncan Smith changed his stance from opposing the repeal of Section 28 of the Local Government Act 1988 to supporting its repeal. His decision to give Conservative MPs a free vote on the issue was described as "illogical" and "messy" by other Conservative MPs in 2003.

As leader, he imposed a three-line whip to support a House of Lords amendment to the Adoption and Children Act 2002 that would have restricted adoption to married couples, disqualifying gay couples at the time. The amendment was rejected by 344 to 145, with eight Conservative MPs rebelling.

Duncan Smith has become significantly involved in issues of family and social breakdown. He has stated his support for early interventions to reduce and prevent social breakdown. In December 2010, he studied a state-sponsored relationship education programme in Norway, under which couples were forced to "think again" and confront the reality of divorce before formally separating. The policy has been credited with reversing Norway's trend for rising divorce rates and halting the decline of marriage in the country over the past 15 years. Duncan Smith said he was keen to explore ways in which similar approaches could be encouraged in Britain. Officials pointed out that such a programme would be expensive but that an approach could reduce the long-term cost of family breakdown, which has been estimated at up to £100 billion. Duncan Smith said couples in Norway were able to "work through what is going to happen with their children", which has "a very big effect on their thinking". "Many of them think again about what they are going to embark on once they really understand the consequences of their actions subsequently," he said.

Duncan Smith said in February 2011 that it was "absurd and damaging" for ministers not to extol the benefits of marriage for fear of stigmatising those who choose not to marry. Duncan Smith said: "We do a disservice to society if we ignore the evidence which shows that stable families tend to be associated with better outcomes for children. There are few more powerful tools for promoting stability than the institution of marriage." He added that "The financial costs of family breakdown are incredibly high. But what is most painful to see is the human cost – the wasted potential, the anti-social behaviour, and the low self-esteem." In April 2012, he signalled his support for same-sex marriage on the basis that it would promote stability in relationships.

=== Views on immigration ===
Duncan Smith has said that tighter immigration controls are vital if Britain is to avoid "losing another generation to dependency and hopelessness". In a speech delivered in Spain in 2011 he said that only immigrants with "something to offer" should be allowed into the country and that too often foreign workers purporting to be skilled take low-skilled jobs that could be occupied by British school leavers. According to The Daily Telegraph's analysis, the speech contained a warning to David Cameron "that a "slack" attitude to immigration will result in the coalition repeating the mistakes made under Labour, when the vast majority of new jobs generated before the recession were taken by immigrants". Duncan Smith believes that some companies are using immigration as "an excuse to import labour to take up posts which could be filled by people already in Britain". He says Britain needs an immigration system that gives the unemployed "a level playing field". "If we do not get this right then we risk leaving more British citizens out of work, and the most vulnerable group who will be the most affected are young people," he said.

=== R (Miller) v. Secretary of State for Exiting the European Union ===
On 3 November 2016 and in response to the decision of the High Court in R (Miller) v. Secretary of State for Exiting the European Union on whether the UK government was entitled to notify an intention to leave the European Union under Article 50 of the Treaty on European Union without a vote in Parliament, Duncan Smith stated that "it's not the position of the courts to tell parliament or the Government how that process should work. It never has been. Their job is to interpret what comes out of parliament, not to tell parliament how it goes about its functions."

=== Brexit ===
In December 2019, Duncan Smith voted in favour of the Brexit withdrawal agreement. When the House of Commons debated the agreement at the time, Duncan Smith argued against further scrutiny by the House, stating that Members of the House "had more than 100 hours in committee over the last 3 and a half years ... If there is anything about this arrangement that we have not now debated, thrashed to death, I would love to know what it is."

He later bemoaned the "fine print" in the Withdrawal Agreement.

== Personal life ==
Duncan Smith married Elizabeth "Betsy" Fremantle, daughter of the 5th Baron Cottesloe, in 1982. The couple have four children, and live in a country house belonging to his father-in-law's estate in Swanbourne, Buckinghamshire. He is a Roman Catholic.

Parliament of the United Kingdom
Preceded by Norman Tebbit	Member of Parliament for Chingford; 1992–1997	Constituency abolished
New constituency	Member of Parliament for Chingford and Woodford Green; 1997–present	Incumbent
Political offices
Preceded by Harriet Harman	Shadow Secretary of State for Social Security; 1997–1999	Succeeded by David Willetts
Preceded by John Maples	Shadow Secretary of State for Defence; 1999–2001	Succeeded by Bernard Jenkin
Preceded by William Hague	Leader of the Opposition; 2001–2003	Succeeded by Michael Howard
Preceded by Yvette Cooper	Secretary of State for Work and Pensions; 2010–2016	Succeeded by Stephen Crabb
Party political offices
Preceded by William Hague	Leader of the Conservative Party; 2001–2003	Succeeded by Michael Howard
