= California Cursed =

Studio album by Drain
- Released: April 10, 2020
- Recorded: 2019
- Genre: Hardcore punk; crossover thrash
- Length: 22:12
- Language: English
- Label: Revelation

Drain chronology
Time Enough at Last (2017)	California Cursed (2020)	Living Proof (2023)

California Cursed is the debut studio album by American hardcore punk band, Drain. The album was released through Revelation Records on April 10, 2020.

== Critical reception ==
In a positive review, Conor Atkinson of Exclaim! gave California Cursed an 8 out of 10 saying that the band "write songs – like, real songs. The kind that have the power to transport your mind out of the dystopian nightmare we are all navigating, right into the Santa Cruz ocean waves or a mosh pit in Orange County." Atkinson concluded that "California Cursed is short and sweet, but not in a way that will satisfy some algorithm. The band knows just what to say and just how to say (or scream) it."

== Track listing ==
All tracks are written by Sam Ciaramitaro, Cody Chavez, Justin Rhode, and Tim Flegal

No.	Title	Length
1.	"Feel the Pressure"	3:38
2.	"Hyper Vigilance"	2:04
3.	"Sick One"	0:58
4.	"Army of One"	2:39
5.	"Character Fraud"	2:14
6.	"Hollister Daydreamer"	1:07
7.	"White Coat Syndrome"	2:10
8.	"The Process of Weeding Out"	2:37
9.	"Bad Faith"	2:04
10.	"California Cursed"	2:36
Total length:		22:12

== Personnel ==
Drain

- Sam Ciaramitaro – vocals
- Cody Chavez – guitar
- Tim Flegal – drums
- Justin Rhode – bass guitar
