= Living Proof =

Living Proof may refer to:

== Film and television ==
- Living Proof: The Hank Williams Jr. Story, a 1983 American television film
- Living Proof (2008 film), an American television film directed by Dan Ireland
- Living Proof (2017 film), a documentary about a person with multiple sclerosis
- "Living Proof" (Arrow), a television episode

== Music ==
=== Albums ===
- Living Proof (Buddy Guy album) or the title song, 2010
- Living Proof (Cher album), 2001
  - Living Proof: The Farewell Tour, a concert tour by Cher, 2002–2005
- Living Proof (Drain album), 2023
- Living Proof (IQ album), 1986
- Living Proof (Lifers Group album), 1993
- Living Proof (State Champs album), 2018
- Living Proof (Sylvester album), 1979
- Living Proof and Living Proof: The MGM Recordings 1963-1975, two albums by Hank Williams, Jr., 1974 and 1992, respectively
- Living Proof, by Sarah Whatmore, unreleased

=== Songs ===
- "Living Proof" (Camila Cabello song), 2019
- "Living Proof" (Ricky Van Shelton song), 1989
- "The Living Proof", by Mary J. Blige from The Help soundtrack, 2011
- "Living Proof", by Bad Meets Evil from Hell: The Sequel, 2011
- "Living Proof", by Bon Jovi from Forever, 2024
- "Living Proof", by Bruce Springsteen from Lucky Town, 1992
- "Living Proof", by Cat Power from The Greatest, 2006
- "Living Proof", by Gregory Alan Isakov from The Weatherman, 2013
- "Living Proof", by Hank Williams, Jr. from Hank Williams Jr. and Friends, 1976
- "Living Proof", by The War on Drugs from I Don't Live Here Anymore, 2021
- "Living Proof", by Wishbone Ash from Just Testing, 1980

== Other uses ==
- Living Proof, a 2012 novel by Kira Peikoff
- Living Proof Radio, KWTW, a Christian radio network based in Bishop, California, US
