= Into the Land of Phantoms =

Studio album by Jill Tracy and the Malcontent Orchestra
- Released: October 31, 2002
- Genre: Neo-cabaret
- Length: 56:59
- Label: 125 Records

Jill Tracy and the Malcontent Orchestra chronology
Diabolical Streak (1999)	Into the Land of Phantoms (2002)	The Bittersweet Constrain (2008)

Into the Land of Phantoms is the third studio album by American neo-cabaret artist Jill Tracy and the Malcontent Orchestra, released in 2002. It is their score to F.W. Murnau's 1922 silent vampire classic Nosferatu.

== Track listing ==
All tracks are written by Jill Tracy.

No.	Title	Length
1.	"Main Title Theme"	1:44
2.	"Nina and Harker in Love"	1:24
3.	"Renfield Concocts a Scheme"	2:21
4.	"Nina Warns Harker as He Departs"	1:36
5.	"The Carriage Embarks on Its Journey"	0:50
6.	"The Book of the Vampires"	1:59
7.	"Approaching the Land of Phantoms"	1:44
8.	"Aboard the Phantom Carriage"	1:29
9.	"Nosferatu Appears"	1:02
10.	"The Accident at Dinner"	1:39
11.	"Morning"	1:10
12.	"The Locket"	1:06
13.	"Nosferatu Stalks Harker, Amidst Nina's Dreams"	3:44
14.	"Discovering the Coffin"	1:31
15.	"Harker Makes His Escape"	1:13
16.	"The Ocean"	0:51
17.	"Sailors Encounter the Rats"	1:01
18.	"Doctor Van Helsing"	0:44
19.	"Renfield Possessed"	1:05
20.	"The Professor / Renfield Confined"	1:06
21.	"Nina by the Seashore"	1:22
22.	"The Ship"	2:02
23.	"Tragedy At Sea"	1:17
24.	"Terror Below the Deck"	1:59
25.	"The Voyage of the Dead"	1:06
26.	"Nina In A Trance"	0:25
27.	"The Carriage"	0:48
28.	"The Ship Arrives with Ominous Cargo"	1:05
29.	"Nosferatu Carries His Coffin"	1:53
30.	"Crossing the Waters"	0:31
31.	"The Plague"	3:22
32.	"Funeral Procession"	0:43
33.	"Nina Learns the Truth About the Vampire"	2:23
34.	"The Sick Lay Dying / Nina Realizes Her Fate"	1:49
35.	"The Chase"	1:40
36.	"Nina Awaits the Vampire"	2:35
37.	"Nosferatu Sees the Sun"	1:40
38.	"The Village Is Saved"	1:00
Total length:		56:59
