= Sunami (band) =

American hardcore punk band

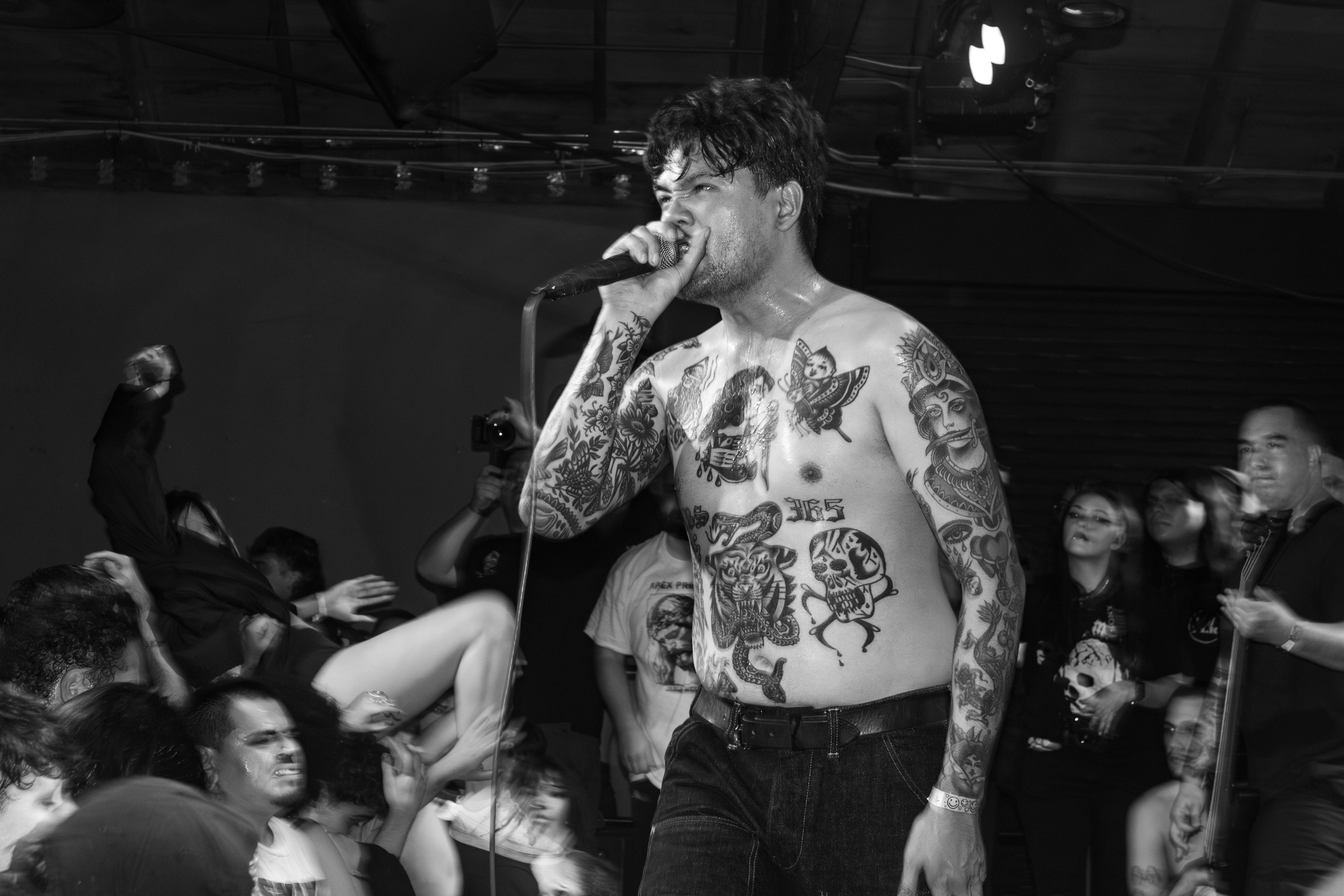
- Sunami live at 1720 Warehouse, Los Angeles, in 2023

Background information
- Origin: San Jose, California, U.S.
- Genres: Beatdown hardcore; metalcore
- Years active: 2019–present
- Labels: Triple B; Creator-Destructor; Viewpoint
- Spinoff of: Drain; Gulch; Spinebreaker
- Members: Josef Alfonso; Mike "Durt" Durrett; Theo Dominguez; Benny Eissmann

Sunami is an American hardcore punk band formed in San Jose, California in 2019. Originally intended as a short-lived joke band by members of various San Francisco Bay Area hardcore bands, Sunami sought to parody the ignorant style of many hardcore bands on their 2019 demo Demonstration. However, after gaining notoriety for their violent debut live performance, the band continued past their planned time frame. They have since released four EPs, with their debut self-titled album being released on June 14, 2023. A 2023 article by Revolver credited them as "in the upper echelon of bands dominating the hardcore zeitgeist".

== History ==
The members who would go on to form Sunami first met through attending local San Francisco Bay Area hardcore shows. Each member had been a part of other bands in the area including Gulch, Hands of God, Drain, Spinebreaker and Lead Dream. The band formed in 2019, as a joke band parodying what the band members perceived as low intelligence in beatdown hardcore. After Josef Alfonso suggested the band's concept, bassist Theo Dominguez proposed the name Sunami, having thought of the name around a decade prior, and Mike Durrett began writing the instrumentals at their friend Charles Toshio's home studio. Toshio wrote and recorded the drums of this early material structured the instrumental parts. This material was released as their debut demo Demonstration, on August 19, 2019. At this time, they intended to only perform live three times as a band: a live debut and EP release show; a breakup show; and a reunion show.

Sunami's live debut was on October 26, 2019. Stereogum described the moshing as particularly intense, with audience members hardcore dancing in Halloween costumes with boxing gloves. Several people were bleeding by the end of Sunami's set, which lasted only eight minutes. The performance took place at the San Jose Peace & Justice Center, a local anti-war community center in San Jose, with the band performing in the smaller living room. The capacity of the room was only seventy but around one hundred people attended, with another one hundred people left outside. Drummer Benny Eissmann joined the band only hours before the performance, after Durrett had posted on his Instagram story asking whether anybody could play drums for it, with the band's first ever rehearsal taking place the same day. Videos of the performance began gaining traction on Twitter and in the following week the band were offered spots to perform at FYA Festival and Sound and Fury Festivals. However, before these events could take place, the COVID-19 lockdowns began, leading to live performances being unable to go ahead.

On March 1, 2021, they released a split EP with Gulch. then they released their debut self-titled EP June 5, 2021. The band's second live performance was a guerrilla-style show which around 2000 people attended on June 19, 2021, in San Jose alongside Gulch, Drain, Scowl, Xibalba and Maya Over Eyes. The performance was in a disused parking lot outside a warehouse their friend owned and the stage was built that morning by Gulch vocalist Elliot Morrow. This was followed by another outside performance on June 27 at the Lvl Up San Jose Punk Rock Flea Market with support from Fentanyl, Lead Dream, Connoisseur and Extinguish. On May 20, 2022, they released their LP Promo EP. On July 30, they performed at the 2022 Sound Fury Festival.

The band's first North American headline tour took place in Spring 2023, with all 28 dates selling out. In May and June they toured Australia with Scowl and Speed. On June 14, they released their self-titled debut album. Between June 23 and July 9, they coheadlined a European tour with No Pressure and support from Pain of Truth, Restraining Order and C4. Between September 16 and 24, 2023, they will headline a Japanese tour.

On March 3rd 2025 they release a split EP with Pain of Truth, titled Coast To Coast. They went on a U.S. co-headline tour with support from Haywire and Peeling Flesh on select dates. In late 2025 they went on another U.S. co headlining tour this time with Scowl. They are scheduled to take part in the 2026 Warped tour.

== Musical style ==
Critics have categorized Sunami's music as beatdown hardcore and metallic hardcore. They often make use of elements of slam metal, crust punk, D-beat, thrash metal and death metal. DSCVRD magazine writer Harry Higginson stated that "Sunami are a quintessential beatdown band with every facet of their sound turned up to the maximum, blending elements of 90s metalcore and death metal into a pummelling, animalistic brawl." Revolver magazine writer Eli Enis stated that "Their hyperbolic tough-guy lyrics and stupidly heavy songs incite violence wherever they hit the stage, but crucially, it's all in the name of good fun."

The band have cited influences including Suffocation, Terror, Cannibal Corpse and First Blood. Alfonso in particular has cited East Coast hip hop as important to his writing style, referencing that the biggest influence on his lyrics and vocal flows for Demonstration was Big L.

== Members ==
- Josef Alfonso – vocals
- Mike "Durt" Durrett – guitars
- Theo Dominguez – bass
- Benny Eissmann – drums

== Discography ==
Albums

- Sunami (2023)

EPs

- Sunami (2020)
- Sunami / Gulch (2021; split with Gulch)
- LP Promo (2022)
- Coast to Coast(2025; split with Pain of Truth)

Demos

- Demonstration (2019)
