= Proof Positive =

Proof Positive may refer to:

- "Proof Positive" (Greene story), a short story by the English novelist Graham Greene
- Proof Positive (album), by American jazz musician J. J. Johnson
- Proof Positive, an album by the American ambient musician Steve Roach
- Proof Positive (TV series), an American paranormal investigation series
- Proof Positive, a novel by the American writer Phillip Margolin

== See also ==
- Positive (disambiguation)
- Proof (disambiguation)
