= The Devil's Tune =

2003 novel by Iain Duncan Smith

- Front Cover
- Author: Iain Duncan Smith
- Language: English
- Genre: Thriller
- Publisher: Robson Books (a division of Anova Books)
- Publication date: 6 November 2003
- Publication place: England
- Media type: Print (Hardback)

The Devil's Tune is a novel by British politician Iain Duncan Smith, published on 6 November 2003, the same day he left office as leader of the Conservative Party after losing a no confidence vote.

The book is notable for its uniformly negative reception, selling only 18 copies in its first week of release. Among its negative reviews were from Sam Leith in The Daily Telegraph, who wrote, "And I honestly wish I didn't have to say this, because it feels like kicking a man when he is down... but, really, it's terrible. Human sympathy strains in one direction; critical judgment the other. Terrible, terrible, terrible". John Sutherland, the Northcliffe Professor of English literature at University College London, said "IDS has as much chance of doing a Winston Churchill as Rapper Tony Benn has of going quadruple platinum". For The Guardian, Peter Preston said, "His prose ranges from lumpen to beserkly lush... the plotting is full of clumsy clotting".

Two of Smith's Conservative colleagues who had also written novels, Edwina Currie and Ann Widdecombe, commented on the book, with Currie saying, "It's not exactly Tolstoy, is it?" and Widdecombe offering limited praise, calling the novel "scarcely the greatest literature of all time but as a thriller and easy read it will while away a plane journey (or, at 400-plus pages, a couple of plane journeys) perfectly pleasantly...the dialogue is severely cliché-ridden but people do have a habit of talking in clichés".
