= 100 Proof =

100 Proof may refer to:

- 100° proof, alcohol proof
- 100 Proof (film), 1997
- 100 Proof (album), Kellie Pickler album
- 100 Proof: The Hangover, Statik Selektah album
- "100 Proof" (song), Kellie Pickler song
- 100 Proof (Aged in Soul), an American funk/soul group
