= Living Proof (Drain album) =

Studio album by Drain
- Released: May 5, 2023
- Studios: The Pit; Studio 606
- Genres: Hardcore punk; crossover thrash
- Length: 25:07
- Label: Epitaph

Drain chronology
California Cursed (2020)	Living Proof (2023)	...Is Your Friend (2025)

"My lyrics are just one of those things I think a lot of fans skip over to spare themselves, like. 'Oh, 'because Drain are a bunch of regular, relatable people who love their friends and families — not a bunch of macho 'HARDCORE IS ALL THAT MATTERS' dudes — these must be upbeat songs about California. Or maybe it's like cartoon anger for fun,' So, no, I don't think people really listen to me. Yes, we're having a good time, but it comes from a real place, and that's hopefully what makes it meaningful. I love being positive, but it's hard work. If anything, my closest friends would tell you, "Nah, Sammy's default is to be a fucking dickhead pessimist.'"

— Vocalist Sammy Ciaramitaro on writing lyrics for Living Proof

Living Proof is the second full-length studio album by American hardcore punk band Drain, released by Epitaph Records on May 5, 2023.

== Reception ==
Andrew Sacher of BrooklynVegan chose this as one of the top ten hardcore albums of mid-2023. Robin Murray of Clash Music gave this album an 8 out of 10, calling it an evolution of the band's sound and hardcore punk in general and sums up that it is "a thoroughly enjoyable record start to finish, driving at breakneck speed and boasting some truly wicked moments". In Exclaim!, Paul Dika rated this release a 9 out of 10 for being "a near perfect hardcore record with no skips that proves DRAIN is one of, if not the most, dominating voices in the genre". Writing for Kerrang!, Luke Morton gave this a 5 out of 5, writing that the band has lived up to the hype it garnered from previous releases and favorably comparing this music to Slayer. At PunkNews, Sam Houlden rated Living Proof 4 out of 5 stars, writing that "energetic, aggro hardcore with thrash flourishes and freneticism is the name of the game and DRAIN play that specific game better than maybe anyone else active today" and calling this a mix of hardcore punk and thrash metal.

Editors at Stereogum chose this as the 47th best album of 2023 and the eighth best hardcore album of the year. Editors at Revolver ranked this the best hardcore album of 2023. Editors at Loudwire included this among the 25 best rock and metal albums of 2023.

== Track listing ==
No.	Title	Length
1.	"Run Your Luck"	2:52
2.	"F.T.S. (K.Y.S.)"	2:19
3.	"Devil's Itch"	2:05
4.	"Evil Finds Light"	2:08
5.	"Imposter"	2:28
6.	"Intermission"	1:53
7.	"Weight of the World"	3:17
8.	"Watch You Burn"	2:36
9.	"Good Good Things" (Descendents cover)	2:11
10.	"Living Proof"	3:22
Total length:		25:07

== Personnel ==
Drain

- Sammy Ciaramitaro – vocals
- Cody Chavez – guitar, bass guitar
- Tim Flegal – drums

Additional personnel

- Julian Berman – photography
- Silvio Capoferri – artwork
- Zane Daniel – photography
- Harold Griffin – layout
- Mike Kalajian – mastering
- Jon Markson – mixing
- Sean Reilly – photography
- Shakewell – rapping on "Intermission"
- Anna Swiechowska – photography
- Taylor Young – recording
