= FoolProof =

FoolProof Foundation
- Founded: 2006 by Walter Cronkite and a group of young people in the US
- Type: Educational foundation
- Purpose: Consumer education
- Region served: United States & world
- Method: Consumer life skills, healthy skepticism, online education, peer-to-peer education
- Key people: Malcolm Kirschenbaum, President; Roberta Baskin, Director; Will deHoo, Founder and Executive Director; Drew Guthrie, Chief Operating Officer; Remar Sutton, Founder and Emeritus President
- Website: https://www.foolprooffoundation.org

The FoolProof Initiative is a project by the FoolProof Foundation that teaches consumer life skills and healthy skepticism to consumers. It teaches consumers to question anyone who wants to impact their money or welfare. Its resources are generally listed under financial literacy resources.

FoolProof was founded by Walter Cronkite and a group of young people. It provides free, advertising-fee, and comprehensive consumer life skills curriculums for middle and high schools, as well as a consumer newspaper.

The peer-to-peer curriculums use video and audio, games and music in a modular system to teach critical thinking skills and habits that can travel with a consumer through life. It also includes complex as well as basic financial concepts such as understanding credit (finance) and credit score, getting a checking account or savings account, and knowing how to use credit cards.

Its motto is "Use Caution. Question Sellers. Rely on Research."

== Characteristics ==
FoolProof is a program designed by young people from across the world to help educate students about financial decisions in a friendly video format using real-life stories. FoolProof can be used for free by anyone, to help (young) people learn about money and the power of healthy skepticism.

== Curriculum ==
Available are a variety of educational programs/curriculums that are tied to state financial literacy standards and guidelines, listed in every state by the United States Department of Education. FoolProof also teaches financial literacy topics required by the Council of Economic Education. All programs are available to any consumer for free.
