= Gulch (band) =

American hardcore punk band

- Origin: Santa Cruz, California, U.S.
- Genres: Hardcore punk; grindcore; metalcore; powerviolence
- Years active: 2016–2022; 2023 (one-off reunion)
- Labels: Closed Casket; Creator-Destructor; Triple-B; Read Leader; Image Comics
- Spinoffs: Sunami
- Spinoff of: Drain, Spinebreaker
- Past members: Elliot Morrow; Cole Kakimoto; Christian Castillo; Sammy Ciaramitaro; Mike Durrett; Tim Flegal

Gulch was an American hardcore punk band formed in Santa Cruz, California in 2016. The band released only one studio album Impenetrable Cerebral Fortress (2020), as well as two EPs and one demo tape. They performed their final live performance on July 31, 2022, at the peak of their popularity. The New York Times credited them as one of the driving forces of American hardcore's "Rennaissance" in the 2020s.

== History ==
Gulch formed in 2016 in Santa Cruz, California, releasing the demo tape Demolition Of Human Construct on January 16, 2017. Following the release of their debut EP Burning Desire to Draw Last Breath on August 10, 2018, the band began to gain national notoriety, soon playing outside of the Bay Area for the first time. They performed at This Is Hardcore Festival on July 28, 2019, before embarking on a ten-day East Coast headline tour in September. In December 2019, they entered Atomic Gardens studio in Oakland to record their debut album. The record was then released on July 24, 2020, as Impenetrable Cerebral Fortress, it included a cover version of "Sin in My Heart" by Siouxsie and the Banshees.

The band became particularly known for their merchandise. This began with a hoodie design they sold as an exclusive for the 2020 FYA Festival, featuring two Sanrio characters. At the time of the festival, the band only printed 40 pieces for each merch order, however by the following year, they would be printing 900 pieces, which would sell out in around 10 minutes. On March 1, 2021, they released a split EP with Sunami. On June 19, 2021, the band performed at a guerrilla-style show which around 2000 people attended in San Jose alongside Sunami, Drain, Scowl, Xibalba and Maya Over Eyes.

On 6 September 2021, the band released a number of tour dates for their final shows, announcing they would be disbanding in the following year. Kakimoto had discussed the intention to disband in interviews as far back as 2020, revealing in an interview with Kerrang! that the band once planned to release their debut album, release a final EP a year later and then promptly disband. On June 21, 2022, they released the single "Monkey Gone To Heaven", a cover a song by the Pixies for an issue of the soundtrack of the What's the Furthest Place From Here? comicbook series. Their final performance was at Sound and Fury festival at Exposition Park in Los Angeles on July 31, 2022. The set ended early due to police cutting the power to the venue. On December 30, 2023, they played a one-off reunion performance in memory of Outta Pocket guitarist, Christopher Oropheza, who died earlier that year.

== Musical style ==
Critics have categorized Gulch's music as hardcore punk, powerviolence, metallic hardcore and grindcore. They often make use of elements of death metal, crust punk, screamo, mathcore, punk rock, noise music, D-beat, sludge metal, electronic music, black metal and deathcore.

Their music is often high tempo and includes heavy riffs and sudden time signature changes. Morrow's lyrics discuss topics including anxiety, fear and guilt. Their songs rarely passed two minutes in length. Their drum parts are generally punk styled, while their guitar riffs merge elements of multiple extreme metal styles. Cult Nation writer EvanMC stated that "Rather than cuing off a pre-recorded bass-drop–as has become increasingly common in hardcore [in Gulch's music] breakdowns emerge naturally. One can hear each guitarist’s playing style, and the bass cuts through, complementing rather than imitating the guitars". Pitchfork Ian Cohen stated their sound is "equally adept with the pure speed-freak flash of the ultra-technical Botch and Dillinger Escape Plan, the sheer ugliness of Emperor or Rotten Sound, and the antisocial populism of any given Sound and Fury headliner". Amos Hayes of DSCVRD magazine stated that "Gulch is feral, their music is the sonic equivalent to dragging your face along concrete. They are one of the most exciting bands in not just California but the world."

== Members ==
Final lineup

- Elliot Morrow – vocals (2016–2022)
- Cole Kakimoto – guitars (2016–2022)
- Christian Castillo – guitar (2019–2022)
- Sammy Ciaramitaro – drums (2016–2022)
- Mike Durrett – bass (2019–2022)

Former members

- Tim Flegal – bass (2016–2019)

== Discography ==
Albums

- Impenetrable Cerebral Fortress (2020)

EPs

- Burning Desire to Draw Last Breath (2018)
- Gulch / Sunami (2021, split with Sunami)

Demos

- Demolition Of Human Construct (2017)
