= Ossified man =

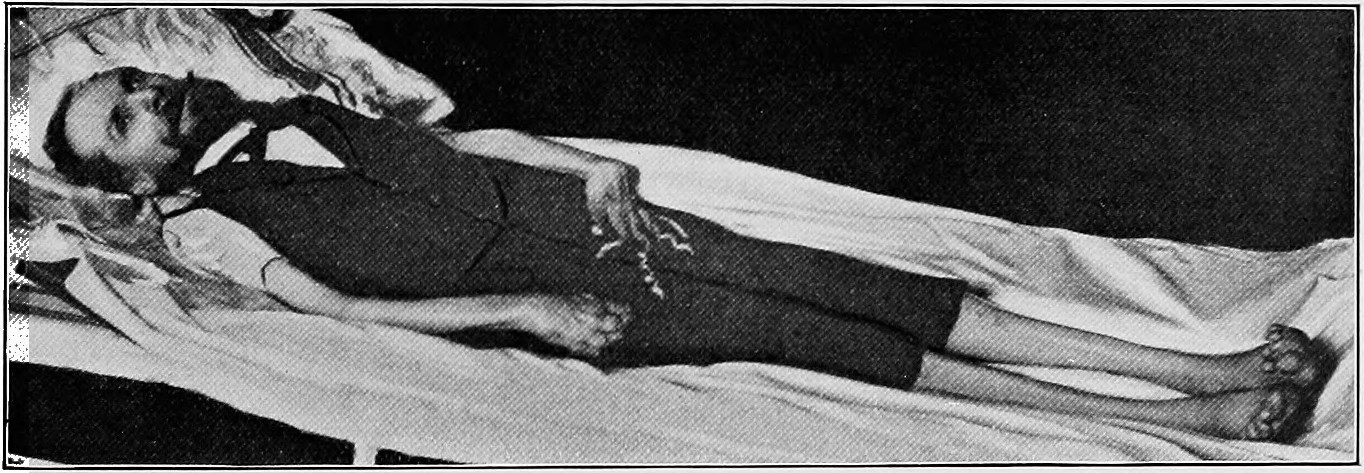
Jonathan R. Bass, a famous ossified man

An ossified man (or, if female, ossified girl or ossified lady) was a common freak show and dime museum exhibit.

Some ossified men suffered from myositis ossificans progressiva, or "stone man disease", in which the soft tissues of the body gradually transform into bone. Others had conditions including ankylosis, cerebral palsy, or rheumatism. They were often advertised with invented conditions, such as "polyarthritis deformans".

In a few cases, automata have been displayed as purported ossified men and women.

Ossified performers included:

- Jonathan R. Bass (1830–1892)
- Dolly Reagan
- Frank Woods
- Charley Porter
- Roy Brad
- George White
- Count Orloff
- Emma Scholler
