= Diabolical Streak =

Studio album by Jill Tracy
- Released: 1999
- Genre: Neo-cabaret, dark cabaret, jazz
- Length: 56:11
- Label: Jill Tracy

Jill Tracy chronology
Quintessentially Unreal (1996)	Diabolical Streak (1999)	Into the Land of Phantoms (2002)

Diabolical Streak is the second studio album by American neo-cabaret artist Jill Tracy, released in 1999.

AllMusic stated in its review of the album, "Tracy doesn't really sound like anyone but herself-though she might just be who Marilyn Manson turns into when he grows up."

== Track listing ==
All tracks are written by Jill Tracy.

No.	Title	Length
1.	"Evil Night Together"	4:35
2.	"The Fine Art of Poisoning"	5:38
3.	"Pulling Your Insides Out"	6:23
4.	"Extraordinary"	6:28
5.	"The Proof"	8:01
6.	"Just the Other Side of Pain"	7:24
7.	"You Leave Me Cold"	3:52
8.	"Doomsday Serenade"	4:26
9.	"Precursor #7 (For a Levitation)"	0:32
10.	"Diabolical Streak"	8:52
Total length:		56:11
