= List of tallest buildings in Yorkshire =

Yorkshire has a range of tall buildings primarily located in its largest city, Leeds, which hosts the current tallest building, Altus House. Two further buildings over 100m are current under construction in Leeds. A smaller number of tall buildings are located in Sheffield, while Yorkshire's other main settlements are largely characterised by low-rise skylines such as York, which is dominated by one tall building, the Minster.

High-rise residential blocks are common in many towns and cities in Yorkshire, with many councils, particularly Leeds, Middlesbrough, Bradford and Hull enthusiastically embracing high-rise living in the 1960s and '70s. Sheffield has fewer high-rise residential blocks, with the council there looking more towards the more modern 'wall like' developments, though some newer high rise buildings are under construction.

== Tallest complete ==
This list ranks externally complete buildings in Yorkshire that are at least 70 metres (230 ft). Spires and architectural details are considered, but a strict definition of "building" is taken, omitting bridges, chimneys, masts, etc..An equals sign (=) following a rank indicates the same height between two or more buildings.

Rank	Name	Height	Floors	Year	City	Image	Notes
1	Altus House	114 metres (374 ft)	38	2021	Leeds		Was the tallest building in Leeds and Yorkshire upon completion in 2021.
2	Bridgewater Place	112 metres (367 ft)	32	2007	Leeds		Tallest building in Leeds and Yorkshire from 2007 to 2021.
3	Sky Plaza	103 metres (338 ft)	36	2009	Leeds		Was the tallest student accommodation in the world upon completion
4	St Paul's Tower	101 metres (331 ft)	32	2010	Sheffield		Tallest building in Sheffield.
5	Jackson House, 44 Merrion Street	100 metres (330 ft)	33	2024	Leeds		
6	Latitude Blue, Tower A	99 metres (325 ft)	32	2025	Leeds		
7	Opal Tower	90 metres (300 ft)	26	2008	Leeds		
8	Wainhouse Tower	84 metres (276 ft)	2	1875	King Cross, Halifax		
9	Latitude Blue, Tower B	82 metres (269 ft)	27	2025	Leeds		
10	Pinnacle	80 metres (260 ft)	20	1973	Leeds		Tallest building in Leeds and Yorkshire from 1973 to 2007.
11	White Rose View Tower 1	79 metres (259 ft)	28	2020	Leeds		
12	Arts Tower	78 metres (256 ft)	20	1965	Sheffield		Tallest building in Sheffield from 1965 to 2010. Was the tallest building in Yorkshire from 1965 to 1973.
13	Park Plaza Hotel	77 metres (253 ft)	20	1965	Leeds		
14	Royal Hallamshire Hospital	76 metres (249 ft)	17	1974	Sheffield		
15=	Wakefield Cathedral	75 metres (246 ft)	N/A	1420	Wakefield		Tallest church building in Yorkshire
15=	Threadworks, Lisbon Street	75 metres (246 ft)	24	2025	Leeds		
15=	Candle House	75 metres (246 ft)	23	2009	Leeds		
18	K2	74 metres (243 ft)	20	1972	Leeds		
19=	Cottingley Towers and Cottingley Heights	72 metres (236 ft)	25	1972	Leeds		
19=	All Souls Church, Halifax	72 metres (236 ft)	N/A	1859	Halifax		
21	York Minster	72 metres (236 ft)	1	1465	York	York_Minster_close	
22	Square Congregational Church	71.5 metres (235 ft)	1	1857	Halifax		
23	Centre North East	71 metres (233 ft)	19	1974	Middlesbrough		Tallest building in Middlesbrough
24=	Central Village Tower	70 metres (230 ft)	22	2014	Leeds		
24=	Symons House	70 metres (230 ft)	22	2020	Leeds		
24=	The Junction	70 metres (230 ft)	23	2023	Leeds		
24=	Broadcasting Tower	70 metres (230 ft)	23	2009	Leeds		

== Tallest under construction ==
The following lists buildings being constructed in Yorkshire that are at least 70 metres (230 ft).

Rank	Name	Height	Floors	City	Notes
1	Cirrus Point, Leeds	134 metres (440 ft)	45	Leeds	Topped out with opening imminent
2	Sky Gardens	105 metres (344 ft)	34	Leeds	Core construction underway
3	Code Sheffield	99 metres (325 ft)	32	Sheffield	Foundations underway
4	Triangle Yard	94 metres (308 ft)	31	Leeds	Superstructure construction underway
5	Calico Sheffield	85 metres (279 ft)	27	Sheffield	Core completed
6	BeckYard	77 metres (253 ft)	26	Leeds	Superstructure construction underway

== Tallest approved ==
The following lists buildings in Yorkshire that are at least 70 metres (230 ft) and have approval to be built.

Rank	Name	Height	Floors	City	Notes
1	The Hexagon, Wellington Square	141 metres (463 ft)	45	Leeds	
2	Former Yorkshire Post Site, Tower A	125 metres (410 ft)	42	Leeds	
3	Merrion Centre Tower	122 metres (400 ft)	37	Leeds	
4	Kings Tower	120 metres (390 ft)	40	Sheffield	
5	Former Yorkshire Bank HQ Site	117 metres (384 ft)	39	Leeds	
6	Former Yorkshire Post Site, Tower B	96 metres (315 ft)	32	Leeds	
7	Former Yorkshire Post Site, Tower C	79 metres (259 ft)	25	Leeds	
8	The Meridian	75 metres (246 ft)	23	Sheffield	Although approved, permission is being sought for a 29-storey development on the same site

== Tallest demolished ==
The following lists buildings in Yorkshire that are at least 70 metres (230 ft) and have been demolished.

Rank	Name	Height	Floors	Years extant	City	Image
1	Arena Point	77 metres (253 ft)	20	1967–2023	Leeds	

== See also ==
- List of tallest buildings in Leeds
- List of tallest buildings in Sheffield
