= Lumière =

Lumière is French for 'light'.

Lumiere, Lumière or Lumieres may refer to:

== Buildings ==
- Lumière, a building used by the Bibliothèque publique d'information in Paris, France
- Lumiere (skyscraper), a cancelled skyscraper development in Leeds, England
- Palais Lumière, cancelled skyscraper in Venice by Pierre Cardin

== Film and TV ==
=== Awards and festivals ===
- Lumière Awards, an annual French film awards ceremony
- The Lumiere Awards, an annual film awards presented by the Advanced Imaging Society
- Lumière Festival, a film festival in Lyon, France
  - Lumière Award (film festival award), an award presented at the Lumière Festival

=== Other uses in film and TV ===
- Institut Lumière, a French organization for the preservation of French cinema
- Lumière, a character in Disney's Beauty and the Beast
- Lumiere (database), an online database of admission numbers for films released in Europe
- Lumière (film), 1976 French drama film
- Lumière! L'aventure commence, a 2016 French documentary about the Lumière brothers directed by Thierry Frémaux
- Lumiere TV, a premium television service available in Cyprus, that broadcasts movies and series
- Télé Lumière, a Christian television station in Lebanon and the Arab World

== Other uses ==
- Auguste and Louis Lumière, French pioneers in film-making
- Lumiere (festival), the UK's largest light festival
- Lumiere (horse), a racehorse
- Lumière (restaurant), a restaurant in Vancouver, Canada
- Lumiere, an AI text-to-video diffusion model by Google
- Lumiere, a type of Changan Alsvin (motor car) in the Pakistani market
- Lumiere Silvamillion Clover, a character in the manga series Black Clover
- Les Lumières, the French name of the Enlightenment
- Lumière, the capital city in the game Clair Obscur: Expedition 33

== See also ==
- Café Lumière, a 2003 Japanese film
- Sorelle Lumière, a 1992 album by Mina
- Luminaire, a light fixture
