= Lumiere (skyscraper) =

General information
- Status: Approved (cancelled in 2010)
- Location: Wellington Street, Leeds, West Yorkshire, England

Height
- Roof: 172 metres (564 ft)

Technical details
- Floor count: 55

Design and construction
- Architect(s): SimpsonHaugh and Partners
- Developer: KW Linfoot
- Main contractor: Carillion

Lumiere was a mixed-use skyscraper development in Leeds, West Yorkshire, England, intended to be completed in 2010. The project was put on hold in 2008 and officially cancelled in 2010.

== Design and planning ==
The project represented the second phase of the redevelopment of a Royal Mail sorting office, which had already seen a 65 metres (213 ft) tall former Royal Mail office reclad to become apartments called West Point.

It was planned than Lumiere would consist of two towers of heights 54 storeys / 171 m (561 ft) and 32 storeys / 112 m (367 ft), both clad in glass, with the taller tower predominantly blue and the smaller tower of a reddish hue. The developers behind the project were KW Linfoot and Scarborough Development Group, and the designers were SimpsonHaugh and Partners and, for the structural design, WSP Group. The construction was being carried out by Carillion.

If construction had proceeded the building would have housed a mixture of apartments, offices, shops, cafés, restaurants and a winter garden. There would have been over 20,000 sq ft (2,000 m^{2}) of retail space and 10,000 sq ft (1,000 m^{2}) of usable office space in the development, and several restaurants and eating establishments. There would also have been around 650 apartments, communal areas and apartments designed by YOO designs.

If completed according to the original proposals, the tower would have become the tallest building in Leeds and Western Europe's tallest residential skyscraper. It would have exceeded the height of Beetham Tower Manchester, to become the tallest building in the United Kingdom outside London if completed before the Piccadilly Tower in Manchester. On 21 July 2006 councillors approved the proposals, with construction scheduled to begin in 2007.

== Construction ==
Proposed height of the completed Lumiere, compared to the height of other existing and approved tall buildings in Leeds.

Groundwork began with boreholes in spring 2007; throughout the late summer of 2007 the site was cleared. In September 2007 work commenced to excavate and remove the existing foundations and basement of the previous Royal Mail building. Substructure work began in early 2008, with the piling works by Cementation Skanska completed by June 2008.

== Suspension ==
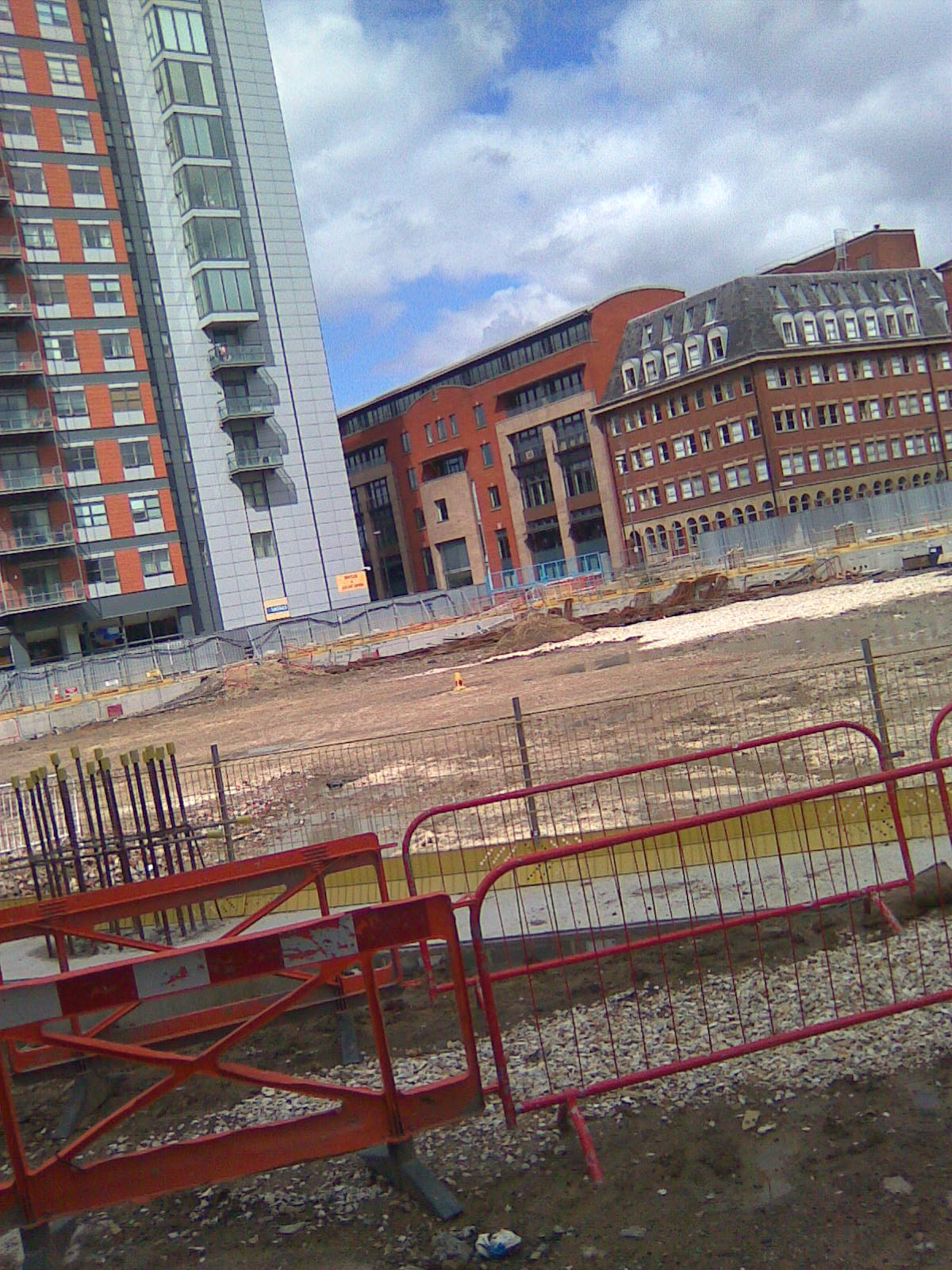
Picture taken of the Lumiere site on 1 August 2008 after work to construct the Simpson Haugh designed twin skyscraper scheme was put on hold

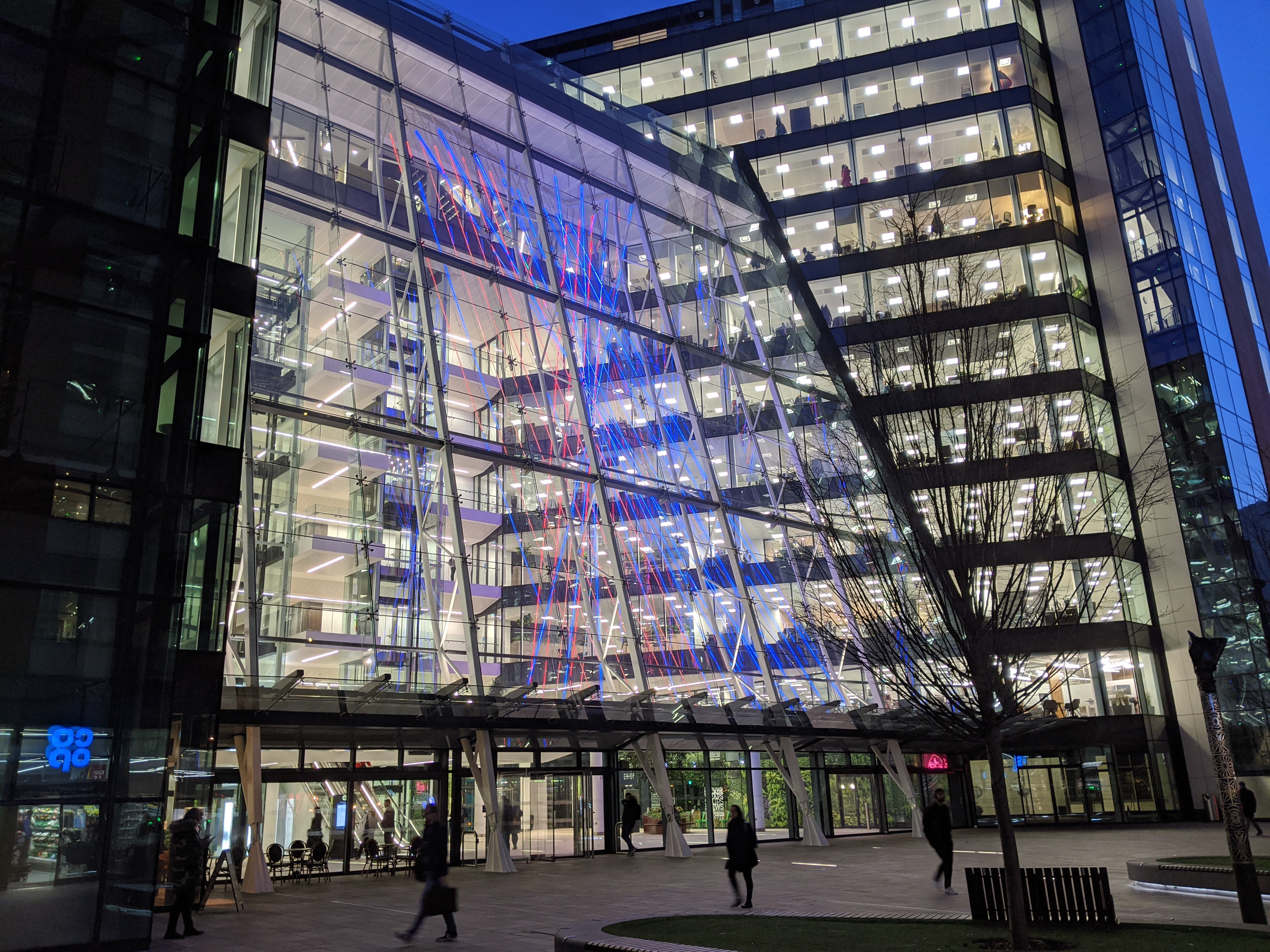
Central Square was built instead on the site (pictured here in February 2020).

However, on 9 July 2008, developers KW Linfoot announced that the project had been put on hold due to the 2008 financial crisis, and construction would not resume until the economy stabilised. Following the postponement of construction, it was announced that the developer had received approval from Leeds City Council to include an additional floor in each tower, the two towers now comprising 55 storeys and 33 storeys. This increased the planned height of each tower by 1 m (3.3 ft).

In February 2009, the developers of Lumiere, KW Linfoot, went into administration; the development was a joint venture and was taken over completely by KW Linfoot's joint venture partners. In August 2010, the owners of the Lumiere development announced they would enter voluntary liquidation, meaning the building will not now be built. The investors will recover their money as they are covered by an insurance policy.

== See also ==
- List of tallest buildings in Leeds
- Architecture of Leeds
