= Hilton Leeds Arena =

Coordinates: 53°48′10.9″N 1°32′47″W

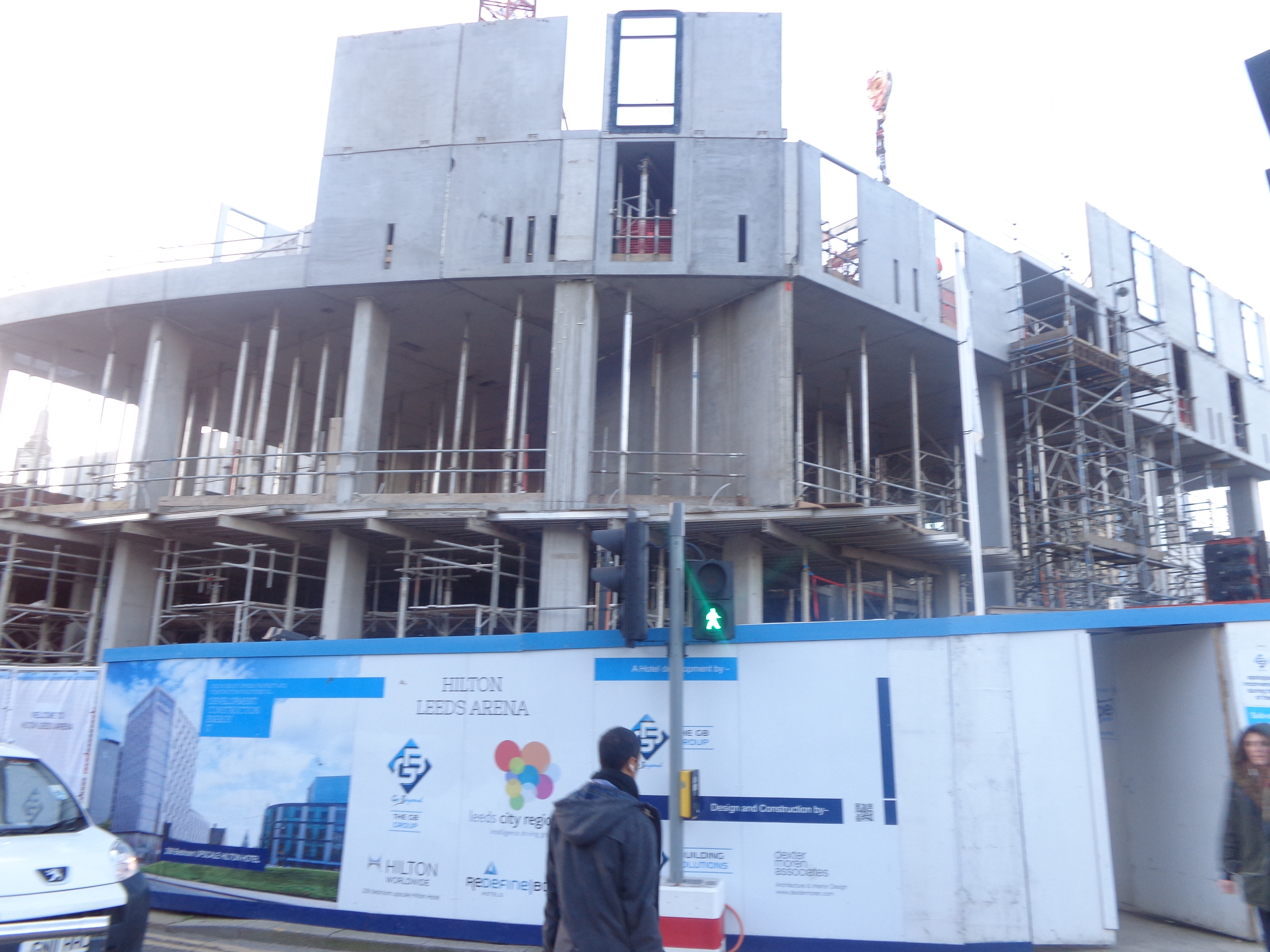
- Leeds Hilton December 2014 - 3 months before work stopped
- Interactive map of the Hilton Leeds Arena area

General information
- Status: Part constructed - work halted
- Location: Leeds, West Yorkshire
- Construction started: 2013
- Completed: TBC

Height
- Roof: 50 metres (164 ft)

Technical details
- Floor count: 15

Design and construction
- Architect: Dexter Moren Associates
- Developer: GB Group

Hilton Leeds Arena known in early planning as the Portland Crescent Hotel was a planned £32 million, 15 storey, four-star, 206-bedroom Hilton hotel. Construction began in Leeds's Civic Quarter in late 2013, with the original projected opening date in 2015 (though this was pushed back into 2016). Designed by Architects and Interior Designers Dexter Moren Associates for developer GB Group, the building was intended to match the nearby Civic Hall, and was to be clad entirely in natural limestone and Portland stone.

In March 2015, the construction arm of Oxford GB Two Group went into administration with work being halted on the project. Since then, the building work has stagnated with nothing being constructed on site. 12 months later, in March 2016, the developing arm of the company also went into administration, which has led to calls for the project to be moved forward and completed from Leeds City Council.

== See also ==
- List of tallest buildings in Leeds
- Architecture of Leeds
