= List of tallest buildings and structures in Leeds =

Tall buildings in Leeds
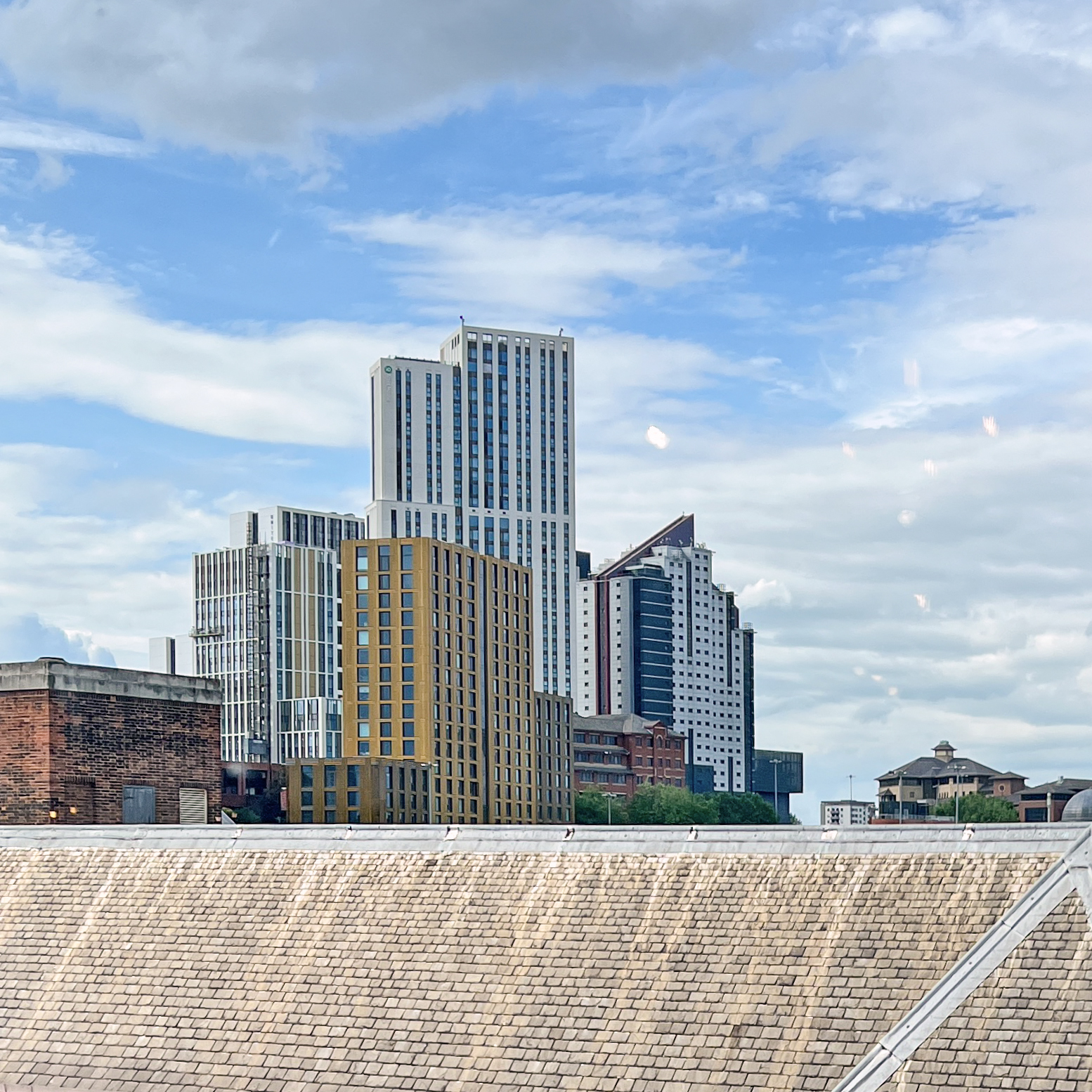
- The Arena Quarter area in 2023, featuring Altus House (centre) and Opal Tower (right)
- Tallest building: Cirrus Point (2026 Topped Out)
- Tallest building height: 134 m (443 feet)

Number of tall buildings
- Taller than 50 m (164 ft): 50 (2025)
- Taller than 100 m (328 ft): 7 (2026)

Leeds is the largest city in Yorkshire with a population of 536,280. It is considered the financial, commercial, and cultural heart of the West Yorkshire Built-up Area, the fourth largest urban area in the United Kingdom, with a population of over 1.7 million. Tall buildings are relatively new to Leeds' history, with the majority of high-rises built after 2000. Many of Leeds' high-rises are coloured in red, a nod to the city's architectural style of red brick buildings.

As of 2026, there are fifty completed and topped-out buildings in Leeds that exceed a height of 50 metres (164 feet), seven of which are taller than 100 m (328 ft). Since 2026, the tallest building in Leeds (topped out) has been Cirrus Point, a student accommodation building at a height of 134 m (443 ft). Cirrus House is the tallest purpose built student accommodation in the world. The oldest building on the list is Holy Trinity Church, constructed in 1727, which stands at a height of 56.7 m (186 ft). Multiple significant high-rises were built during the 2000s, including Opal 3, Candle House, and Bridgewater Place, which was the tallest building in the city from 2007 to 2021 and the first to exceed a height of 100 m.

Since the late 2010s, there has been a rise in the number of residential and student accommodation high-rises being built in Leeds. A significant portion of towers in the city are concentrated in Arena Quarter, including Altus House and Sky Plaza. There are also a number of towers along the River Aire. There are currently 14 skyscrapers with a height of 100 m (328 ft) or more built, being constructed or approved, and over 150 high-rise buildings.

== Tallest buildings and structures ==
This list ranks externally complete Leeds buildings and free-standing structures that stand at least 50 m (160 ft), based on standard height measurement. This includes spires and architectural details but does not include antenna masts. An equals sign (=) following a rank indicates the same height between two or more buildings. The "Year" column indicates the year in which a building was completed. Buildings which have been demolished are not included.

Was the tallest building or structure in Leeds upon completion

Rank	Name	Image	Height m (ft)	Floors	Year	Use	Location	Notes
1	Arena Point		134 (445)	45	2025	Student accommodation	Arena Quarter	Currently the tallest building in Leeds and Yorkshire. Located in the Arena Quarter
2	Altus House		114 (375)	38	2021	Student accommodation	Arena Quarter	Previously the tallest building in Leeds and Yorkshire. Located in the Arena Quarter
3	Bridgewater Place		112 (367)	32	2007	Mixed-use	South Bank	Held the record as the tallest building in Leeds and Yorkshire from 2007 to 2021
4	Sky Plaza		106 (341)	37	2009	Student accommodation	Arena Quarter	Was the tallest student accommodation in the world upon completion, but has since been surpassed
5	Jackson House		100 (330)	33	2024	Student accommodation	Arena Quarter	Also known as 44 Merrion Street
6	Latitude Blue		98 (326)	32	2025	Residential	South Bank	Also known as uncle
7	Opal 3		90 (295)	27	2008	Residental	Arena Quarter	
8	Pinnacle		80 (262)	20	1973	Office	Shopping Quarter	Formerly and colloquially known as West Riding House
9	White Rose View Tower 1		79 (260)	28	2020	Student accommodation	Arena Quarter	Student residential
10	Park Plaza Hotel		77 (253)	20	1966	Hotel	City Square	Formerly known as Royal Exchange House, approved to be demolished for 134 m (440 ft) student residential
11	Candle House		75 (246)	23	2009	Residential	Granary Wharf	
12	K2		74 (243)	20	1972	Mixed-use	Civic Quarter	Formerly known as Dudley House, renovated in 2003
13=	Cottingley Heights		72 (236)	25	1972	Residential	Cottingley	Renovated in 1989
13=	Cottingley Towers		72 (236)	25	1972	Residential	Cottingley	Renovated in 1989
14=	Symons House		70 (230)	23	2020	Student accommodation	Merrion Street	
14=	Broadcasting Tower		70 (230)	23	2009	Student accommodation	Broadcasting Place	Voted world's best tall building 2010
14=	Central Village Tower		70 (230)	22	2014	Student accommodation		
17	Leeds Town Hall		68.6 (225)		1858	Municipal building	Civic Quarter	
18	Clarence House		66.5 (218)	20	2008	Residential	Leeds Dock	
19=	Central Square		65 (213)	12	2016	Office	Financial Quarter	
19=	West Point		65 (213)	17	1975	Residential	Financial Quarter	Formerly known as Royal Mail House, renovated in 2005
21	City Island Phase 2		61 (200)	20	2007	Residential		
22=	Parkinson Building		57 (187)		1951	University	Universities	
22=	Vita		57 (187)	19	2019	Student accommodation	Grand Quarter	
24	Holy Trinity Church		56.7 (186)	2	1727	Religious	Shopping District	Current spire added 1839
25=	The Headline		56 (184)	18	2021	Residential	Financial Quarter	
25=	Castle House		56 (184)	14	1988	Office	Financial Quarter	
27=	1 City Square		54 (177)	12	1997	Office	City Square	
27=	Blue		54 (177)	14	2004	Residential	Granary Wharf	
29=	3 Central Village		53 (174)	17	2016	Student accommodation	Universities	
29=	Hampton By Hilton		53 (174)	14	1960s	Hotel	Eastgate	
29=	Tinshill BT Tower		53 (174)	N/A	1967	Telecommunications	Otley Old Road	Commonly known as Cookridge Tower
32=	White Rose View Tower 2		52 (171)	18	2020	Student accommodations	Arena Quarter	Student residential
32=	Vita II		52 (171)	16	2020	Student accommodations	Universities	Student residential
32=	Bond Court		52 (171)	13	1970s	Office	City Square	Formerly known as Sun Alliance House, renovated in 2005
32=	Platform (formerly known as City House)		52 (171)	15	1962	Office	City Square	Formerly known as British Railways House, major renovation commenced
32=	Leeds Civic Hall		52 (171)	6	1933	Municipal building	Civic Quarter	
32=	Calverley Building, Leeds Beckett University		52 (171)	13	1960s	University		
32=	The Gateway		52 (171)	15	2008	Mixed-use	East Street	
39=	X1 Aire		50 (164)	14	2017	Residential	East Street	
39=	Portland Building, Leeds Beckett University		50 (164)	12	1960s	University	Universities	
39=	Nuffield Hospital		50 (164)	12	2003	Hospital	Civic	
39=	Skyline Tower		50 (164)	17	2009	Residential	Quarry Hill	
39=	Whitehall Waterfront		50 (164)	16	2004	Residential	Wellington	
39=	Whitehall Quay		50 (164)	18	2002	Mixed-use	Wellington	
39=	City Island		50 (164)	16	2006	Reisdential	Wellington	
39=	Watermans Place		50 (164)	16	2009	Mixed-use	Granary Wharf	
39=	Merrion House		50 (164)	13	1964	Office	Arena Quarter	
39=	Wade House		50 (164)	13	1964	Office	Arena Quarter	
39=	Lloyds Bank		50 (164)	10	1972	Bank	Financial Quarter	
39=	Princes Exchange		50 (164)	12	2001	Office	Station	

== Tallest under construction or approved ==
=== Under construction in winter 2024 ===
Rank	Name	Use	Height		Floors	Image	Notes
Rank	Name	Use	metres	feet	Floors	Image	Notes
1	Sky Gardens (Midland Mills)	Residential	105	345	34		Topped Out
2	Latitude Blue Tower A	Residential	99	325	32		Topped out
3	Triangle Yard	Residential	94	308	31		Topped Out
4	Latitute Blue Tower B	Residential	82	269	27		Topped Out
5=	Phoenix Tower A	Residential (PRS)	67	220	22		
5=	Doncaster Monks Bridge Tower E	Residential (PRS)	67	220	21		
7	Latitude Purple Tower B	Residential (PRS)	64	210	21		
8	Live Oasis	Student residential	62	203	20		
9=	Latitude Purple Tower B	Residential (PRS)	55	180	17		
9=	Phoenix Tower B	Residential (PRS)	55	180	17		
9=	Carlton Hill	Student residential	55	180	15		
12=	SOYO E	Residential (PRS)	54	176	17		
12=	SOYO F	Residential (PRS)	54	176	17		
14	City Square House	Office	52	170	12		
15	Doncaster Monks Bridge Block D	Residential (PRS)	50	164	16		
16	Doncaster Monks Bridge Block C	Residential (PRS)	45	145	15		
17	Doncaster Monks Bridge Block C	Residential (PRS)	45	145	15		
18	Points Cross Block A & B	Residential (PRS)	–	–	11		

=== Approved ===
Rank	Name	Height (m)	Height (ft)	Floors	Year (estimated completion)
1	Yorkshire Post Tower A	154	505	42	Approved 2023
2	The Hexagon	141	462	45	Approved 2024
3	Merrion Centre Tower	122	400	37	Approved 2025
4	Lisbon Square Tower 2	107	340	32	Approved – On site April 2022
5	Midland Mills	103	338	33	Approved
5	Bridge Street tower 5	100	328	31	Approved
5	Bridge Street tower 6	100	328	31	Approved
7	Lisbon Square Tower 1	75	250	26	Approved – On site April 2022
8	Lisbon Square Student Tower (Threadworks)	75	250	25	Approved – On site April 2022
9	Globe Road tower A	73	239	23	Ground Enabling Works Commenced
10	Bridge Street tower 7	70	230	20	Approved
11	St Cecilla Place tower B	68	224	21	Approved
12	Points Cross Block 5	67	220	20	Phase 1 Under Construction
13	St Cecilla Place tower A	62	203	19	Approved
14	St Cecilla Place tower C	62	203	19	Approved
15	Globe Road tower F	60	197	17	Ground Enabling Works Commenced
16	Victoria Gate Hotel	60	197	15	Approved
17	Technology Campus Student Block	60	197	20	Demolition Complete – Completion predicted 2023
18	Bridge Street tower 4	58	190	16	Approved
19	Sovereign Square Hotel	53	174	15	Approved
20	Brotherton House	45	148	14	Approved
21	City Reach	–	–	10–14	Approved
20	Latitude (Yellow Block)	44	144	10	Approved
21	No.2 Whitehall Riverside (Block 1,2 & 3)	–	–	8	Approved

== Demolished buildings ==
Rank	Name	Image	Height m (ft)	Floors	Year built	Year Demolished	Notes
1	Albion Tower aka Leeds Permanent Building Society Tower		61 m (200 ft).		1960s	1998	Demolished in 1998 for replacement with The Light leisure / shopping complex.
2	Elland Road four floodlights		79 m (259 ft).		1970	1993	Demolished in 1991–93 and replaced with new East Stand and lighting above stands.
3	Arena Point Tower		77 m (253 ft)	19	1968	2023	To be replaced with 134 m (440 ft) tower.

== History of tallest buildings in Leeds ==
Held record		Name and location	Constructed	Height (m)	Height (ft)	Notes
From	To	Name and location	Constructed	Height (m)	Height (ft)	Notes
1727	1841	Holy Trinity Church	1722–1727	57	186	The earliest recorded tallest building in Leeds.
1841	1858	Leeds Minster	1837–1841	42	139	At the time of its construction, it was the largest church in the United Kingdom built on a new site since St Paul's Cathedral.
1858	1966	Leeds Town Hall	1853–1858	69	226	One of the tallest Town Halls in the United Kingdom.
1966	1973	Park Plaza Hotel Leeds	1965–1966	77	253	Also called Royal Exchange House.
1973	2005	West Riding House	1972–1973	80	262	The tallest building in Leeds for 32 years.
2005	2020	Bridgewater Place	2004–2007	112	367	The first Skyscraper in Leeds.
2020	2025	Altus House, Leeds	2019–2021	114	380	The tallest building in Yorkshire and the North East.
2025	–	Cirrus Point, Leeds	2023–	134	443	The world's tallest purpose-built student accommodation (PBSA) and the tallest building in Leeds.

== See also ==
- Listed buildings in Leeds
- List of council high-rise apartment buildings in the City of Leeds
- List of tallest buildings in Yorkshire
