= Park Plaza Hotel Leeds =

Park Plaza Hotel
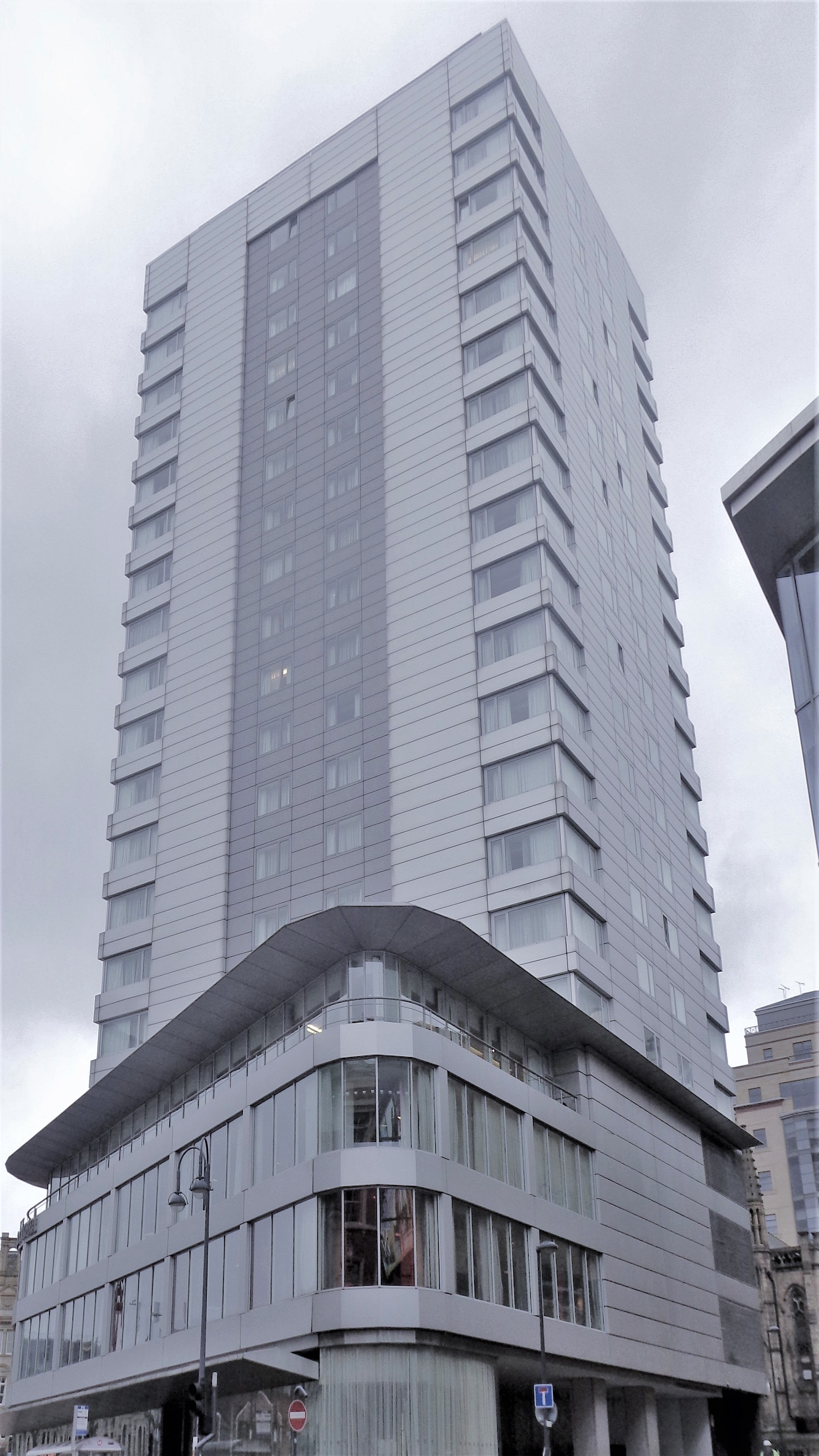
- Interactive map of the Park Plaza Hotel area
- Hotel chain: Park Plaza Hotels & Resorts

General information
- Status: Completed
- Type: Tower
- Location: Leeds, England
- Construction started: 1965
- Completed: 1966
- Owner: PPHE Hotel Group
- Operator: PPHE Hotel Group

Height
- Antenna spire: 82 metres (269 ft)
- Roof: 77 metres (253 ft)

Technical details
- Floor count: 20

Park Plaza Hotel Leeds (also known as Royal Exchange House) is a tower block in Leeds, West Yorkshire, England. It is situated in central Leeds on City Square near Leeds railway station. The tower was completed in 1966 after construction began in 1965 and was then an office block. It was redesigned in 2004 to host the four star Park Plaza Hotel.

It has a roof height of 77m and 20 floors. It was Leeds' tallest building for seven years from 1966 to 1973, when it was succeeded by West Riding House.

The hotel is particularly convenient for Leeds railway station, being situated directly opposite it, overlooking The Queen's Hotel, and for the financial district of Leeds city centre being situated right on the Leeds city centre loop. This is very close to the well known and popular Trinity shopping centre.

== See also ==
- List of tallest buildings in Leeds

Records
| Preceded by Leeds Town Hall; 69 m (226 ft) | Tallest building in Leeds; 1966 – 1973 | Succeeded by West Riding House; 80 m (260 ft) |
