= Bridgewater Place =

Building in Leeds, West Yorkshire, England

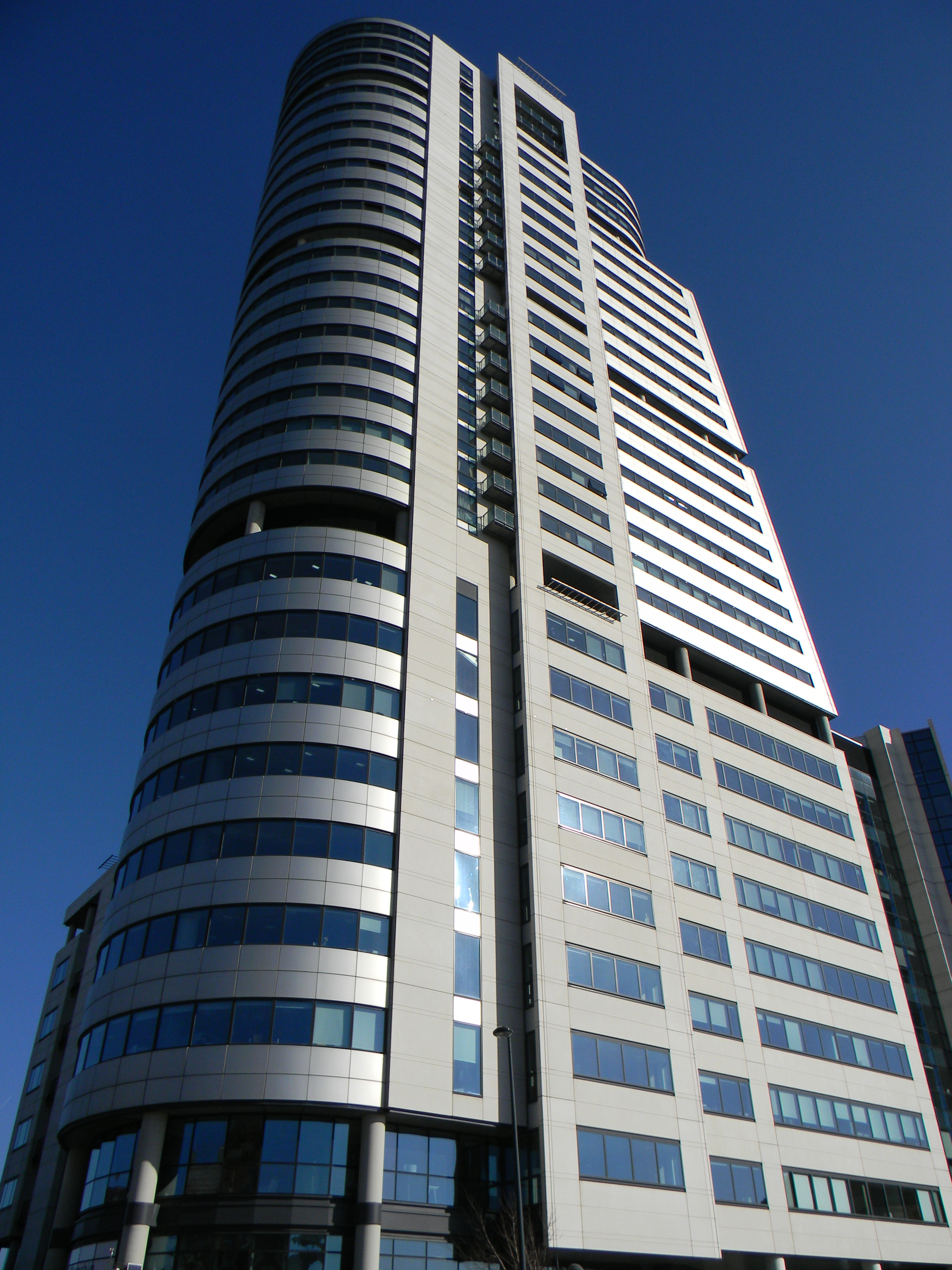
- Interactive map of the Bridgewater Place area

General information
- Status: Completed
- Type: Skyscraper (Note: Under the Emporis Standards Committee, a skyscraper is defined as a multi-storey building which is at least 100 m tall.)
- Location: Leeds, England
- Coordinates: 53.7920°N 1.5479°W
- Estimated completion: 2006
- Opening: 2007

Height
- Roof: 112 m (368 ft)

Technical details
- Floor count: 32
- Floor area: 40,000 m^{2} (430,000 sq ft)

Design and construction
- Architect: Aedas
- Developer: KW Linfoot
- Main contractor: Bovis Lend Lease

Bridgewater Place, nicknamed The Dalek, is an office and residential skyscraper in Leeds, West Yorkshire, England. It was the tallest building in Yorkshire at the time of being topped out in September 2005, but is now the third-tallest after another two Leeds buildings, Altus House and Cirrus Point. Bridgewater Place is visible from up to 25 miles (40 kilometres) away.

== The Building ==
Leeds unveiled plans for Bridgewater Place in 2001, as an £80 million 30-storey tower with eight floors of office and retail space and the rest given over to flats and penthouses. There were doubts at the time from local watchdogs about its potential wind and shade characteristics, but Leeds City Council was enthusiastic about having a true skyscraper downtown. Construction was expected to finish in autumn of 2003.

The building was ultimately completed in April 2007. At the time, it was the tallest and largest building in Yorkshire, with 32 storeys, a height of 110m, and 400,000 sq ft of space, although it was exceeded in height by the local 330m Emley Moor TV mast. It was called "the Dalek" in the Yorkshire Evening Post within a month of opening.

Although the Evening Post stood up for it then despite the nickname, it has perennially been deemed an eyesore. Aedas was nominated for the Carbuncle Cup in 2008 on its account, it was found in a 2023 study to be one of the top ten buildings worldwide called "ugly" most frequently on Twitter, and Owen Hatherley said in 2011 that it looks "very cheap," though he allowed that it "at least...has some personality." An Aedas architect involved in the project said he feels that "some of the bad press [his] building has received has shown a lack of understanding of the constraints every architect works under."

== Wind microclimate ==
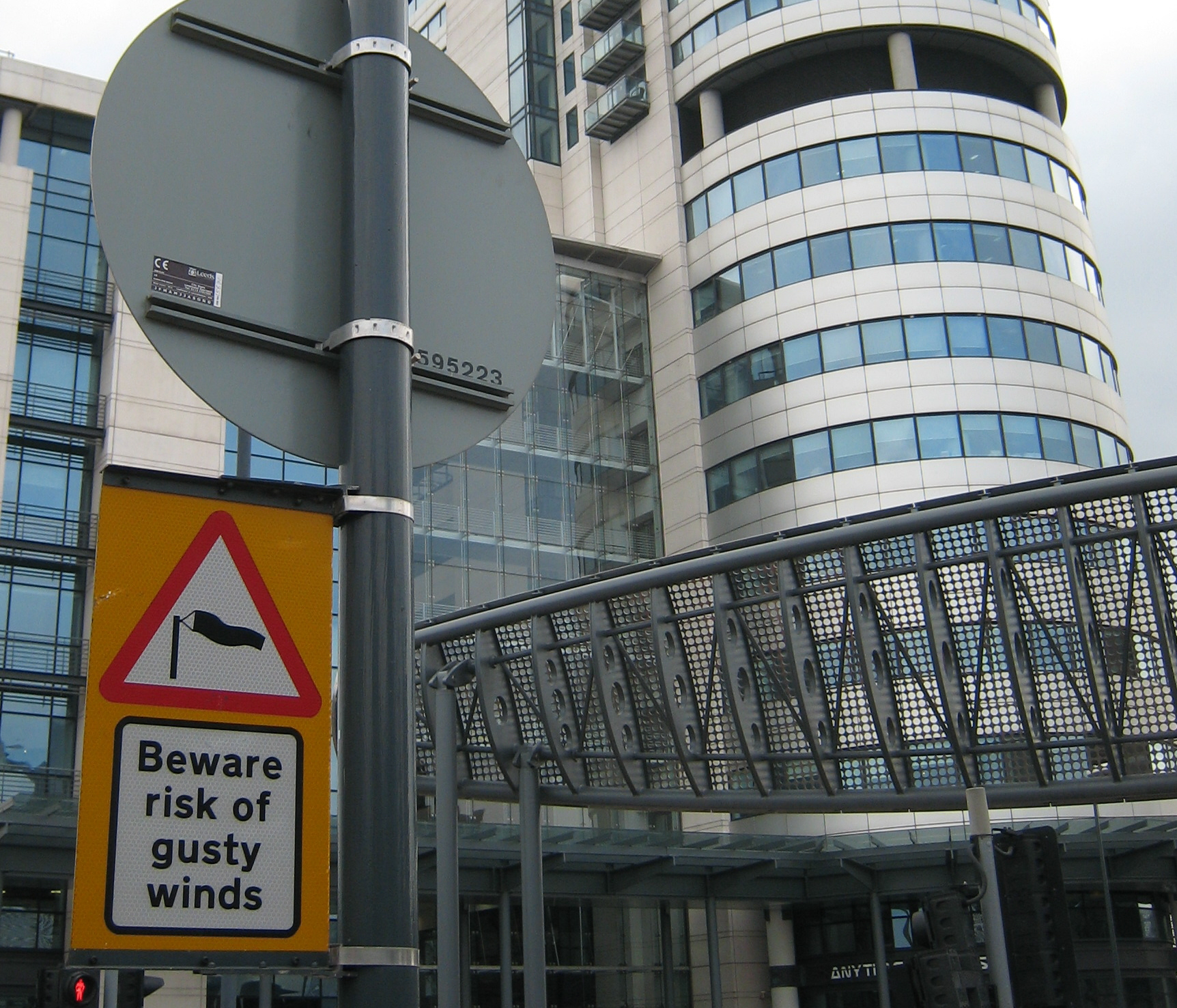
Warning sign for pedestrians

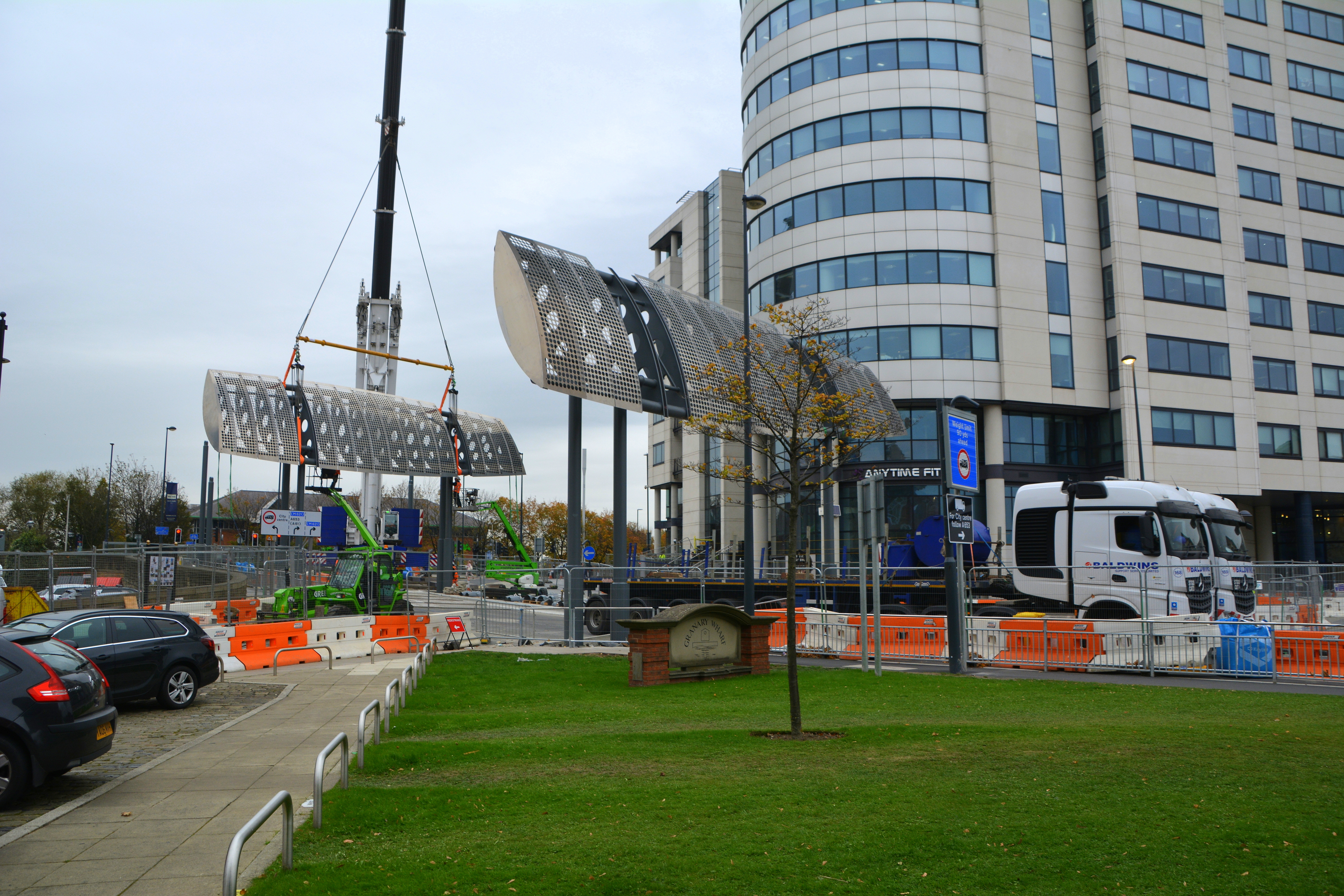
Wind baffles during installation

Following the Property reaching practical completion in April 2007, it became apparent that the Property had created an unacceptable wind microclimate, principally to the north of the Property on Water Lane and also at the junction with Water Lane/Neville Street. It was found that the Property was accelerating winds coming from a westerly direction and also creating wind downdraft from the residential tower. Wind speeds were measured as high as 79 mph, comparable to a hurricane. One person suffered a torn liver and internal bleeding, and cuts requiring 11 stitches, and a buggy with a three-month-old child was pushed out into the road by a sharp gust. In March 2011, a local man, Dr Edward Slaney, was killed by a lorry overturned on him by a gust. The Crown Prosecution Service advised against bringing charges of corporate manslaughter against the architects, Aedas.

As a result, a wind mitigation scheme (the "Wind Scheme") was implemented, with construction of the Wind Scheme (comprising a canopy, five screens on the west side of the building and three "baffles" in Water Lane) being completed in summer 2018. The owners of Bridgewater Place at the time, CPPI Bridgewater Place, agreed to pay the £903,000 cost of installation.

In December 2013, at the inquest into Dr Slaney's death, the coroner recommended to Leeds City Council that they institute high wind safety procedures around Bridgewater Place while the wind mitigation works were being built. Leeds City Council did this in February 2014. When winds were above 35 mph, the city diverted high sided vehicles from the area, and when above 45 mph, they closed the roads to non-emergency vehicles and diverted pedestrians behind a screen. In October 2019, over a year after the completion of the wind mitigation works, experts hired by Bridgewater Place found that the works had reduced the risk to the public satisfactorily, and an independent expert hired by Leeds verified their findings. Leeds City Council lifted the safety restrictions at their next meeting, charging CPPI Bridgewater Place a total of £1.223 million with the cost of the road closures.

The safety problems caused by the building have affected proposals for other high-rise developments in the city. In August 2016, when submitting plans for Bridge Street, the developers stated that extensive wind tests were being undertaken to avoid 'another Bridgewater Place'.

== Gallery ==
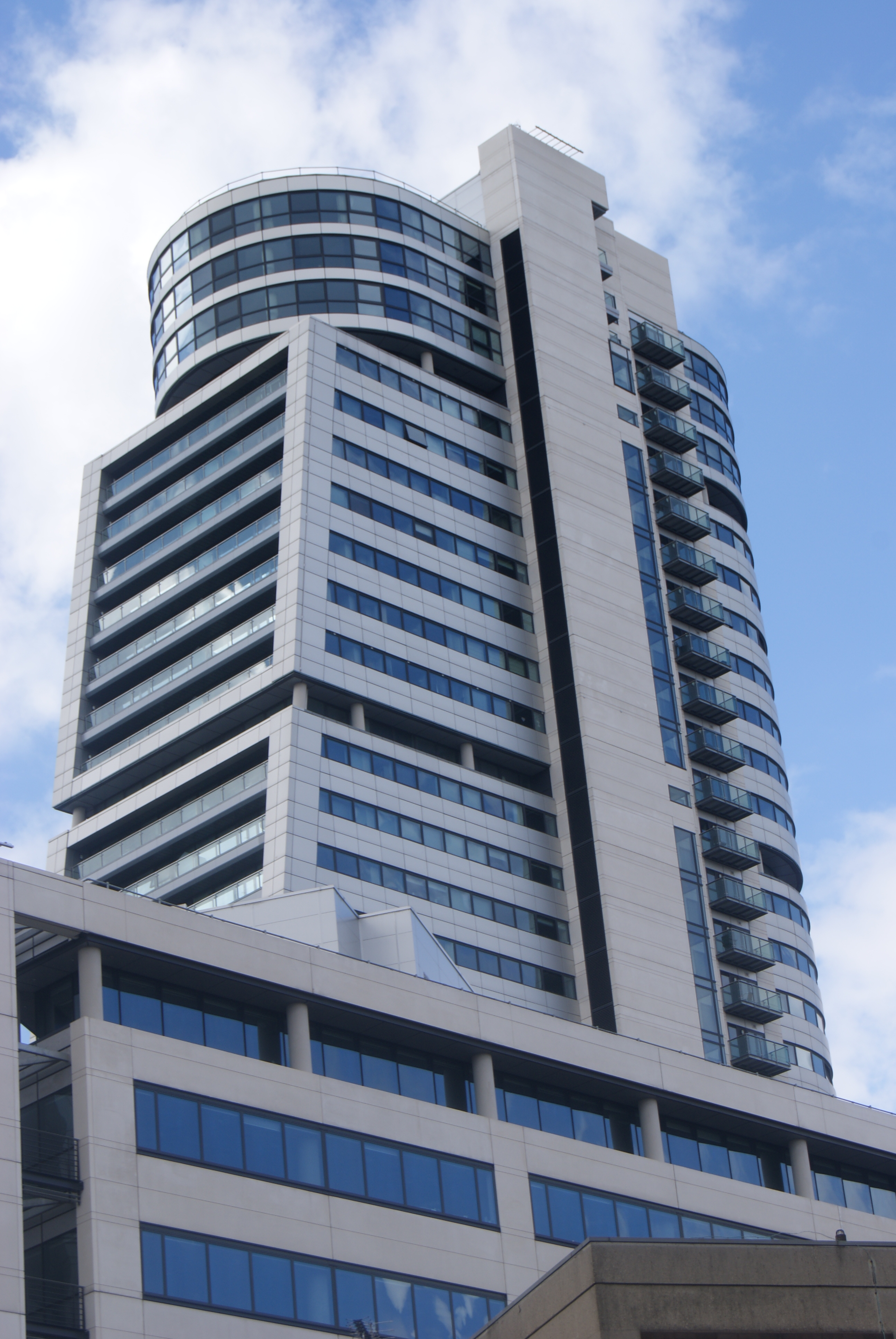

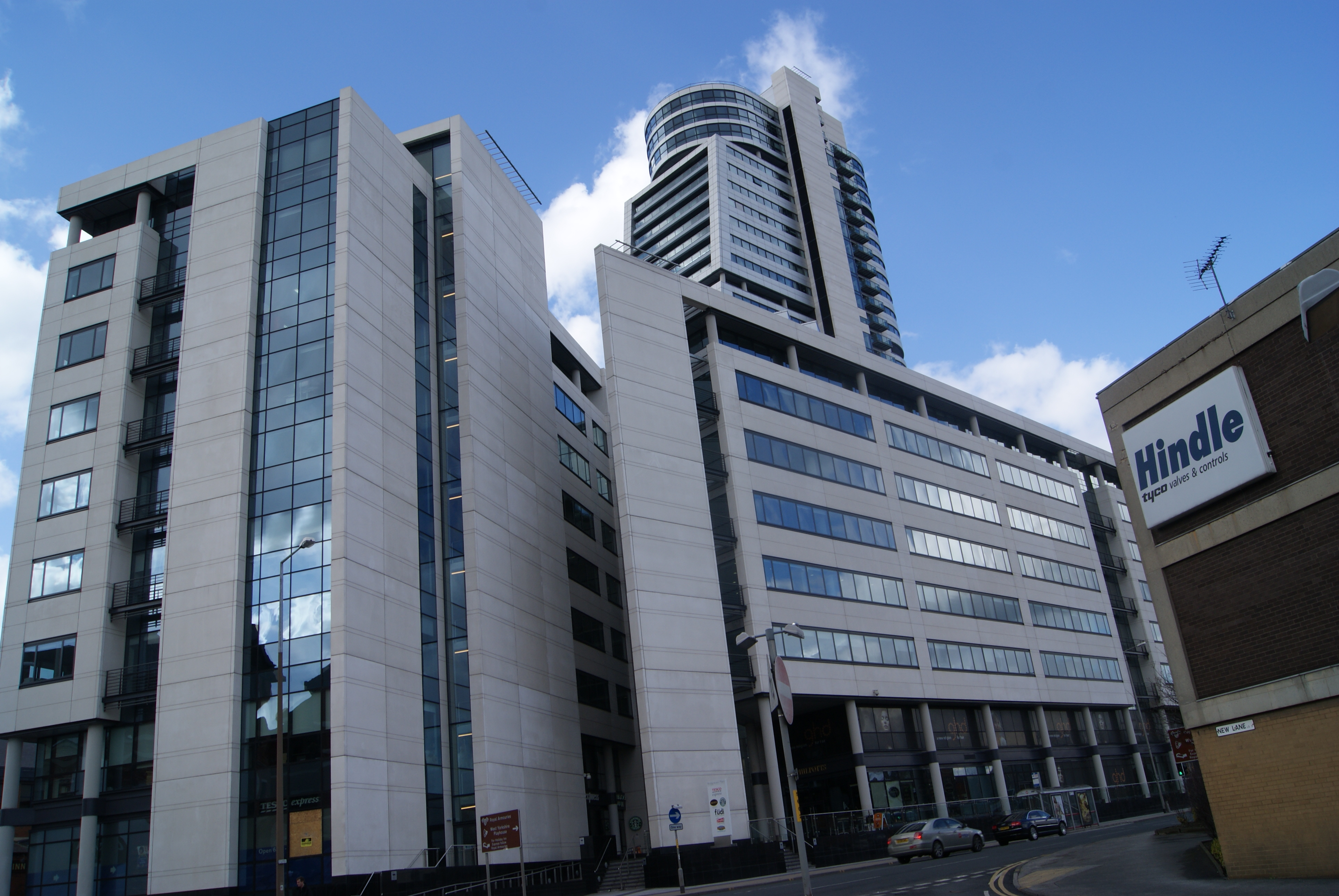

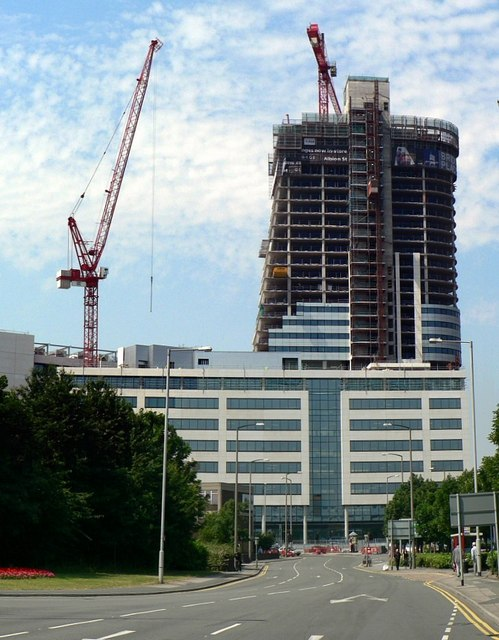
Side view of the Bridgewater Place development under construction

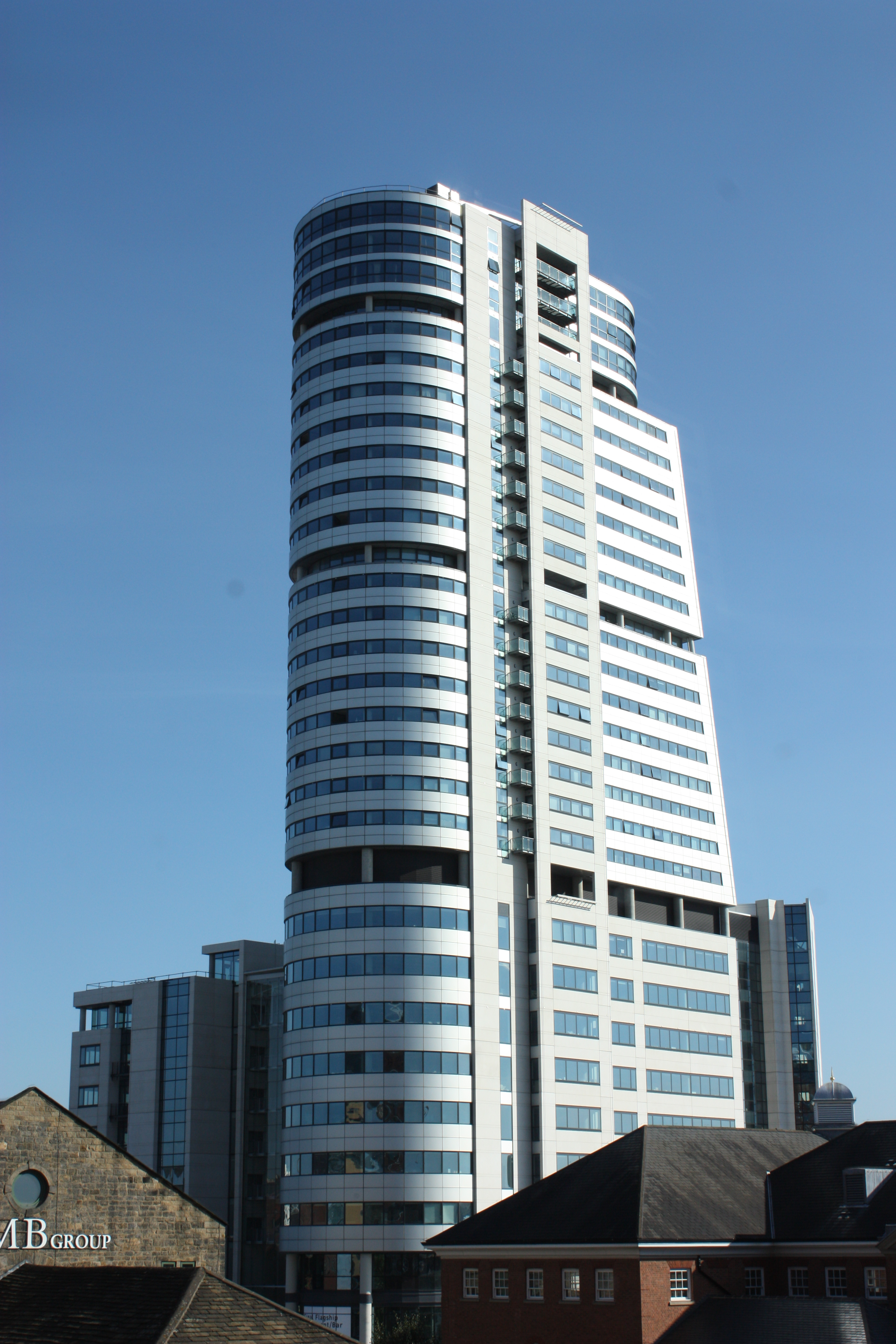
View of the Bridgewater place from Doubletree hotel

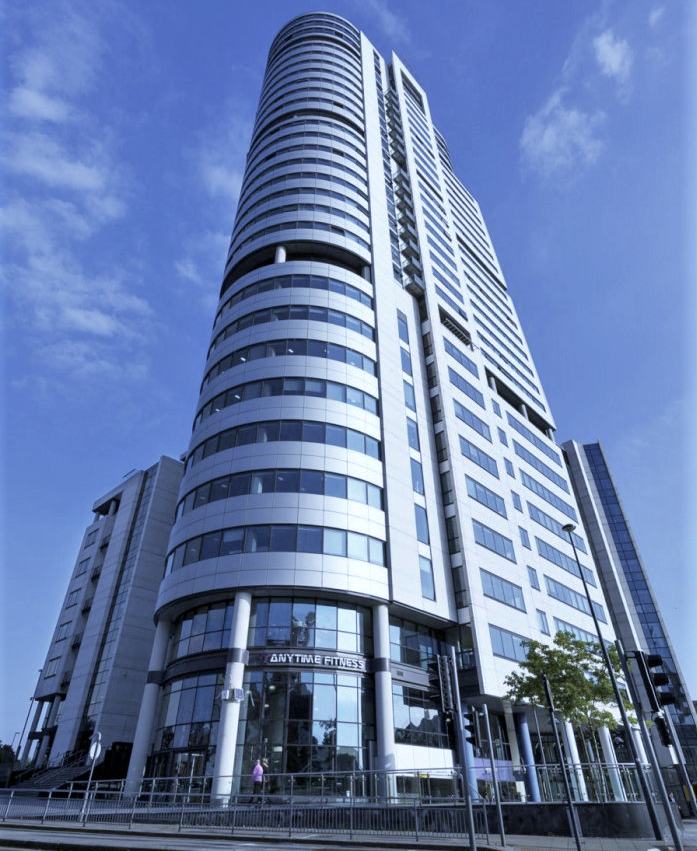

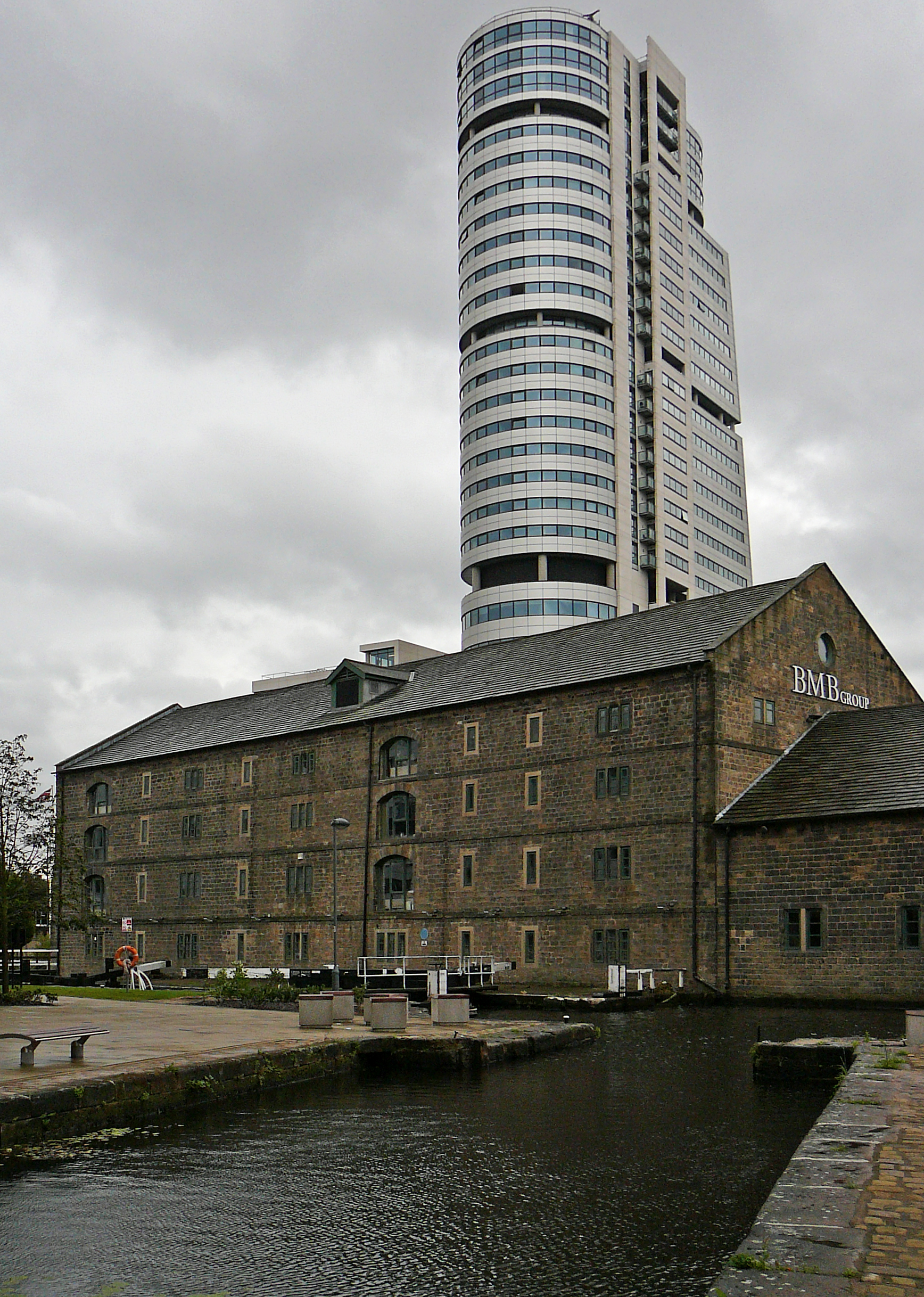
Contrast of old and new architecture in the area

Height of Bridgewater Place compared to the height of other existing and approved tall buildings in Leeds

== See also ==
- List of tallest buildings in Leeds
- Architecture of Leeds

== Notes ==
Records
Preceded by West Riding House; 80 m (260 ft)	Tallest building in Yorkshire; 2005 – 2020	Succeeded by Altus House; 114 m (374 ft)
