= West Point (building) =

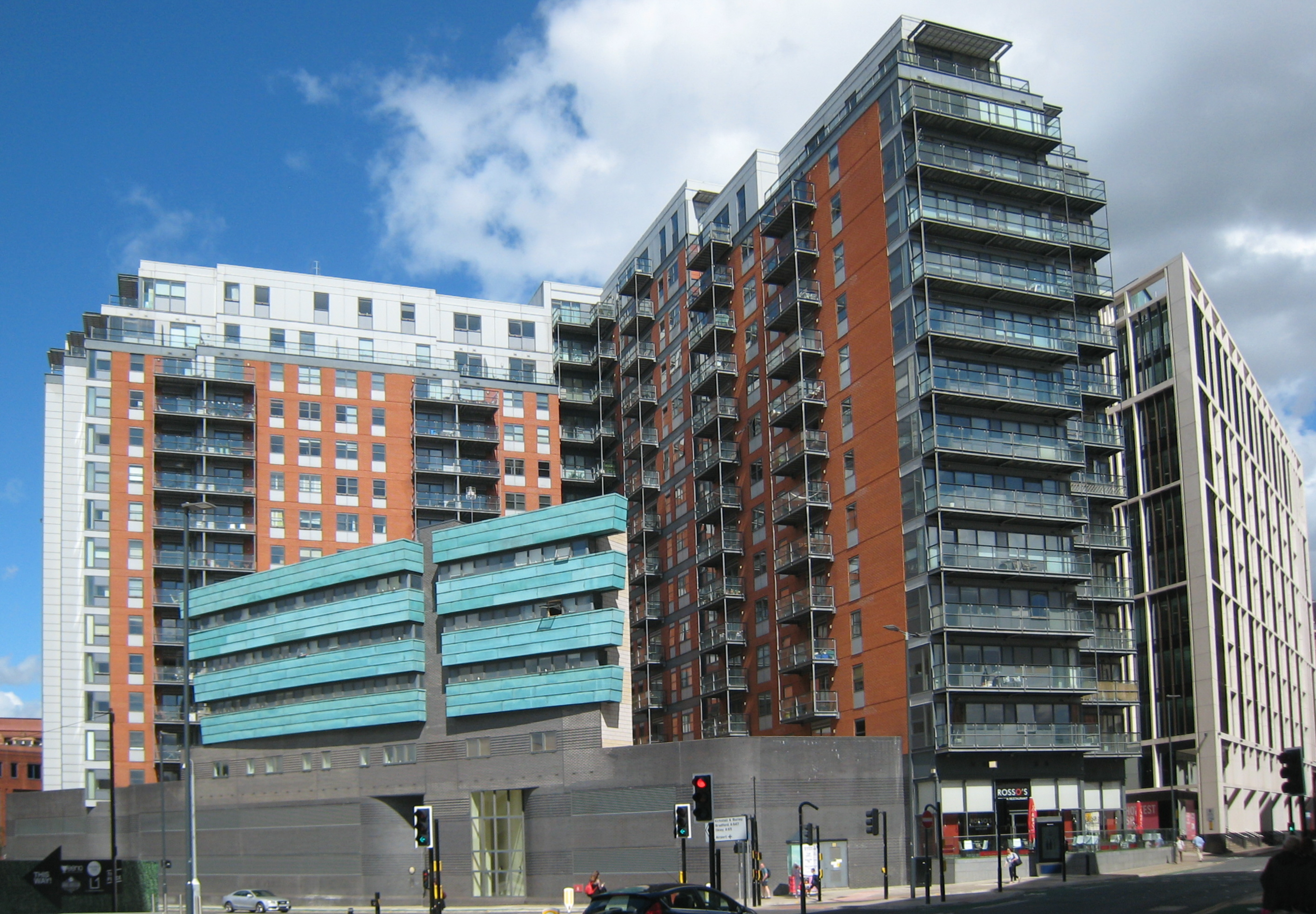
- Interactive map of the West Point area
- Former names: Royal Mail House
- Alternative names: West Central

General information
- Type: Tower block
- Location: 29 Wellington St., Leeds, United Kingdom
- Coordinates: 53.79598°N 1.553707°W
- Completed: 1975
- Renovated: 2003-2006
- Renovation cost: £72 m

Height
- Height: 65 metres (213 ft)

Technical details
- Floor count: 17

Renovating team
- Renovating firm: careyjones architects
- Quantity surveyor: Michael Eyres

West Point, formerly known as Royal Mail House, is a 65 metres (213 ft) tall 17-floor residential tower block located at number 29 of Wellington Street in Leeds, West Yorkshire, England. It was conceived as a landmark building in the skyline and a key gateway building to the city, and the start of redevelopment of the west part of the city.

== Construction ==
The site was occupied by the 1975 Royal Mail building. The old building was mostly demolished in 2003 and the central core stripped to the bare skeleton and rebuilt, with additional wings added from scratch to the central block, giving it a T plan. While the initial intention was to use traditional bonded brick facing (in accord with the later development of the Leeds Look and the adjacent Conservation Area), the old skeleton would not support the weight so instead terracotta tiles were used on this portion, of a size and appearance similar to the brick coursing in the new build. The portions with the lifts and stairs were clad with metal as an architectural expression and to signal the change of use. The southwest side (bordering Northern Street) is closed off by a blue engineering brick wall, and a lower rise podium building with turquoise cladding. The development contains 363 residential units above 17,500 square feet (1,630 m^{2}) of leisure and retail space.

When first opened it was called West Central.
