= West Riding House =

Tower block in Leeds, West Yorkshire, England

Pinnacle
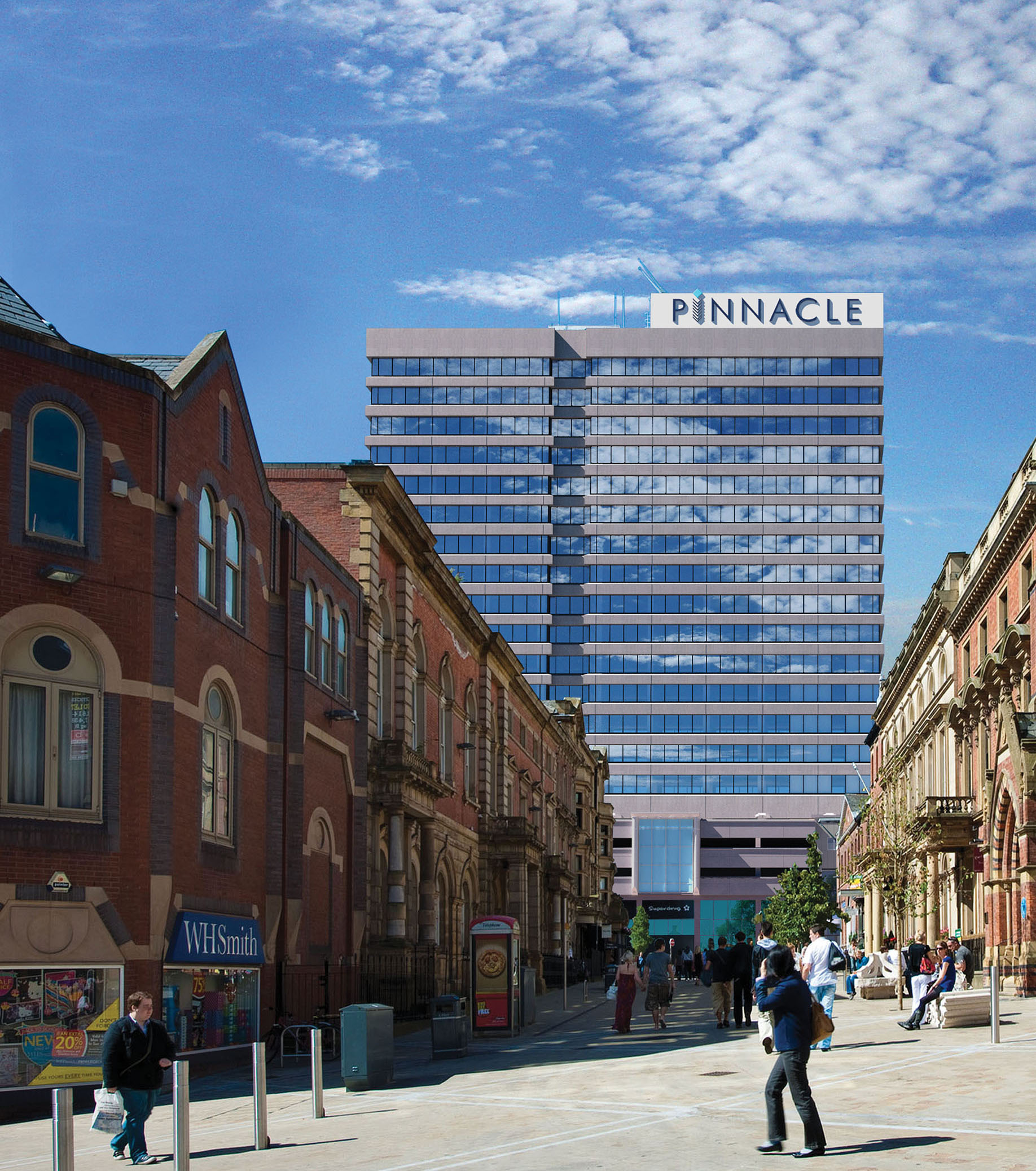
- Viewed from Albion Place
- Interactive map of the Pinnacle area

General information
- Status: Completed
- Location: Leeds, England
- Coordinates: 53.7989°N 1.5453°W
- Completed: 1972

Height
- Roof: 80 metres (262 ft)

Technical details
- Floor count: 20

Pinnacle (formerly West Riding House) is an 80-metre (260 ft) and 20 storey tall office building in Leeds, West Yorkshire, England, which was completed in 1973. The building cost £3.6 million (equivalent to £39,144,000 in 2025) to build in 1973. It was the tallest building in the city until 2005 with the construction of Bridgewater Place.

There are retail units on the ground floor of the building; it is located in the centre of the shopping district of the city. It was internally renovated in the early 2000s followed by a refurbishment of the lower floor retail space at a cost of £6 million (equivalent to £8,413,000 in 2025) in 2013, when it was renamed Pinnacle. Leeds City Council were originally the main tenants in the building but have since vacated their offices there. The building has a small multi-storey car park off Upper Basinghall Street to the rear. Until the 2000s the building stood out on the Leeds skyline, but the construction of taller buildings (including ones on higher ground than Pinnacle) have lessened its prominence.

There is also a smaller West Riding House opposite Forster Square railway station in neighbouring Bradford.

Albion Zion Chapel, later St. James' Chapel, was formerly at this location: see List of places of worship in the City of Leeds#City Centre 3. The Three Coins Club was also here; a nightclub regularly hosted by popular DJ Jimmy Savile in the 1960s.

== Gallery ==
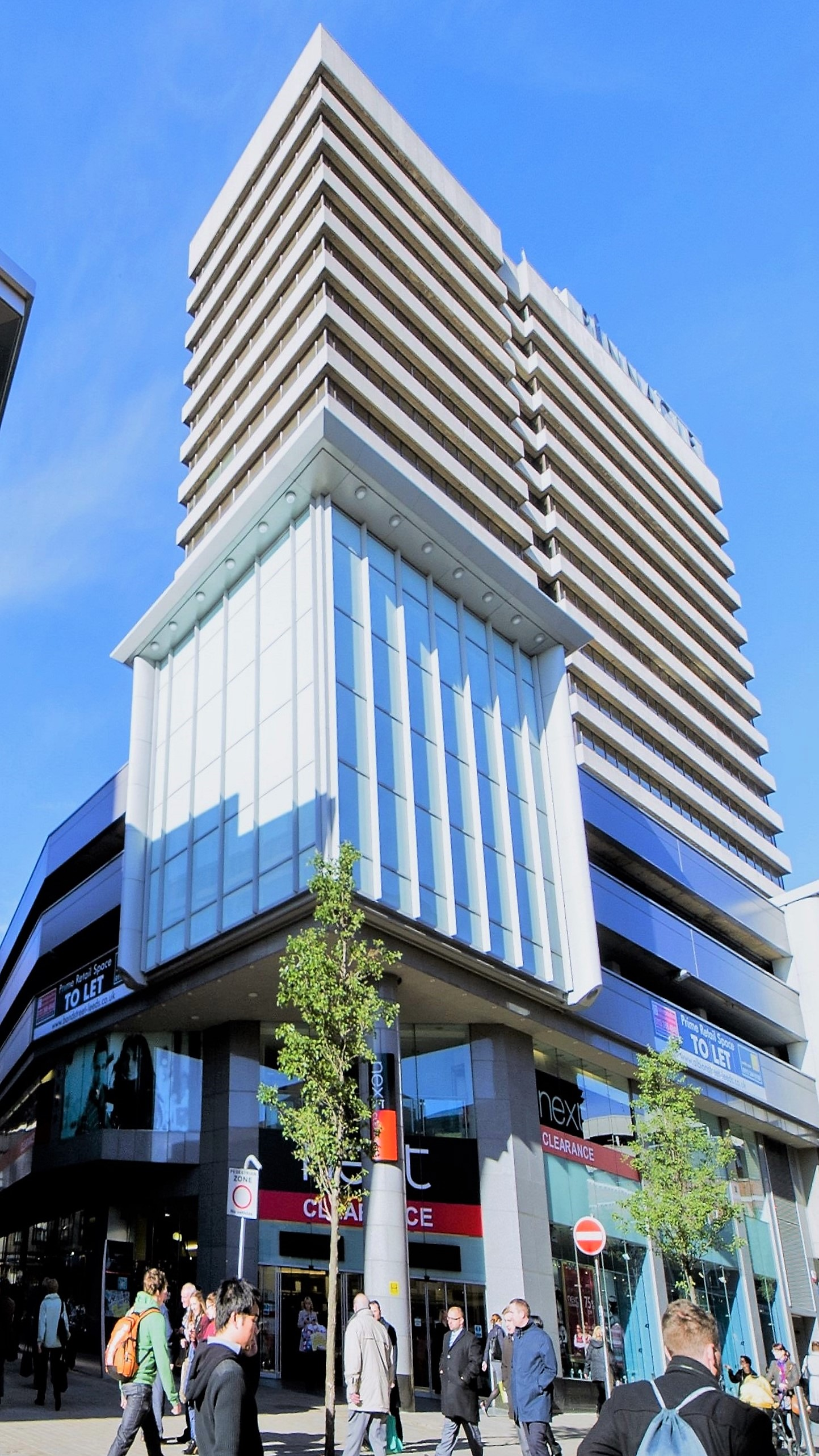
View from street level

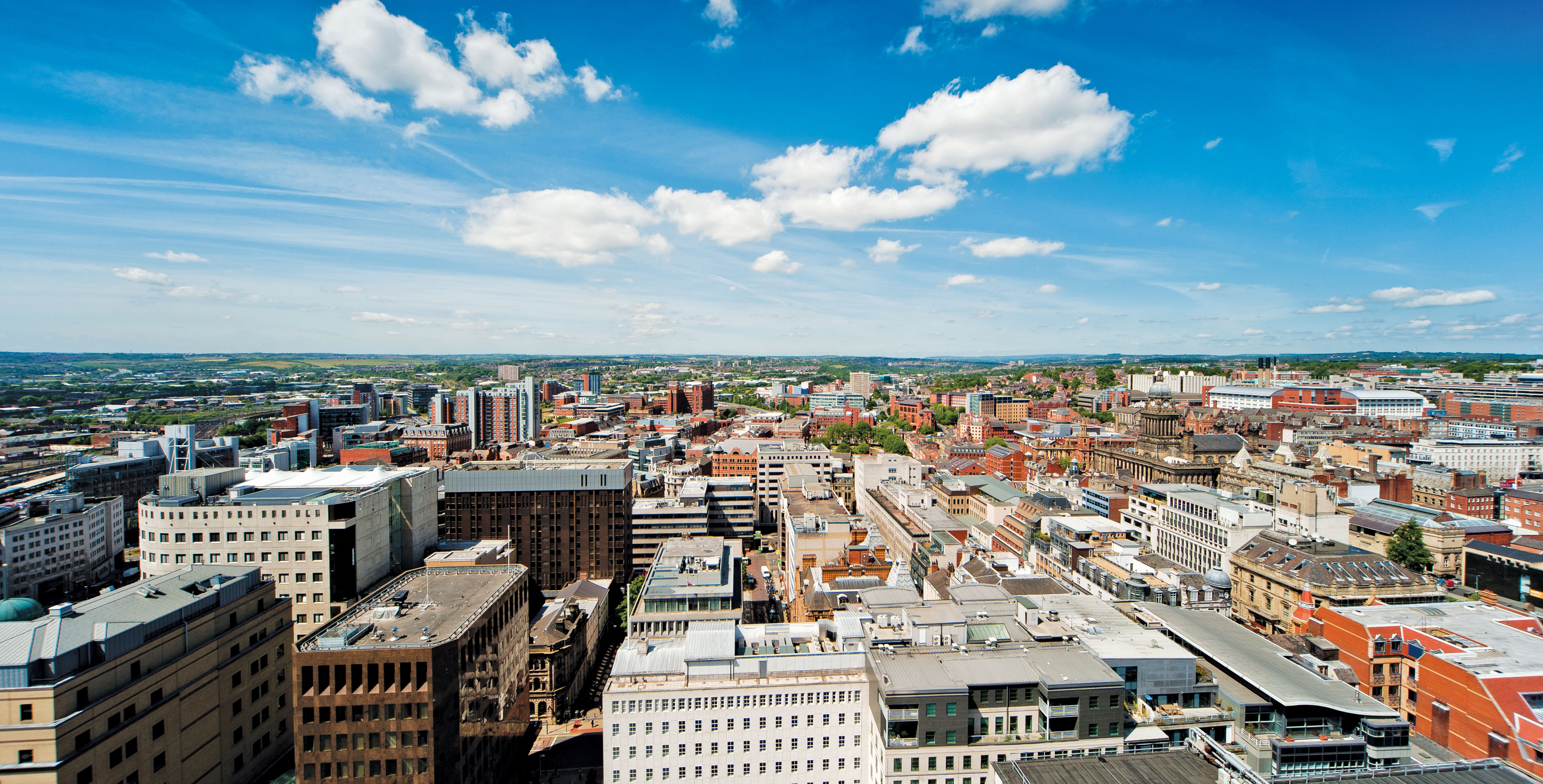
View from inside Pinnacle

== See also ==
- Architecture of Leeds
- List of tallest buildings in Leeds
- Trinity Leeds

Records
Preceded by Arts Tower; 78 m (256 ft)	Tallest building in Yorkshire; 1973 – 2005	Succeeded by Bridgewater Place; 112 m (367 ft)
