= Central Village Tower =

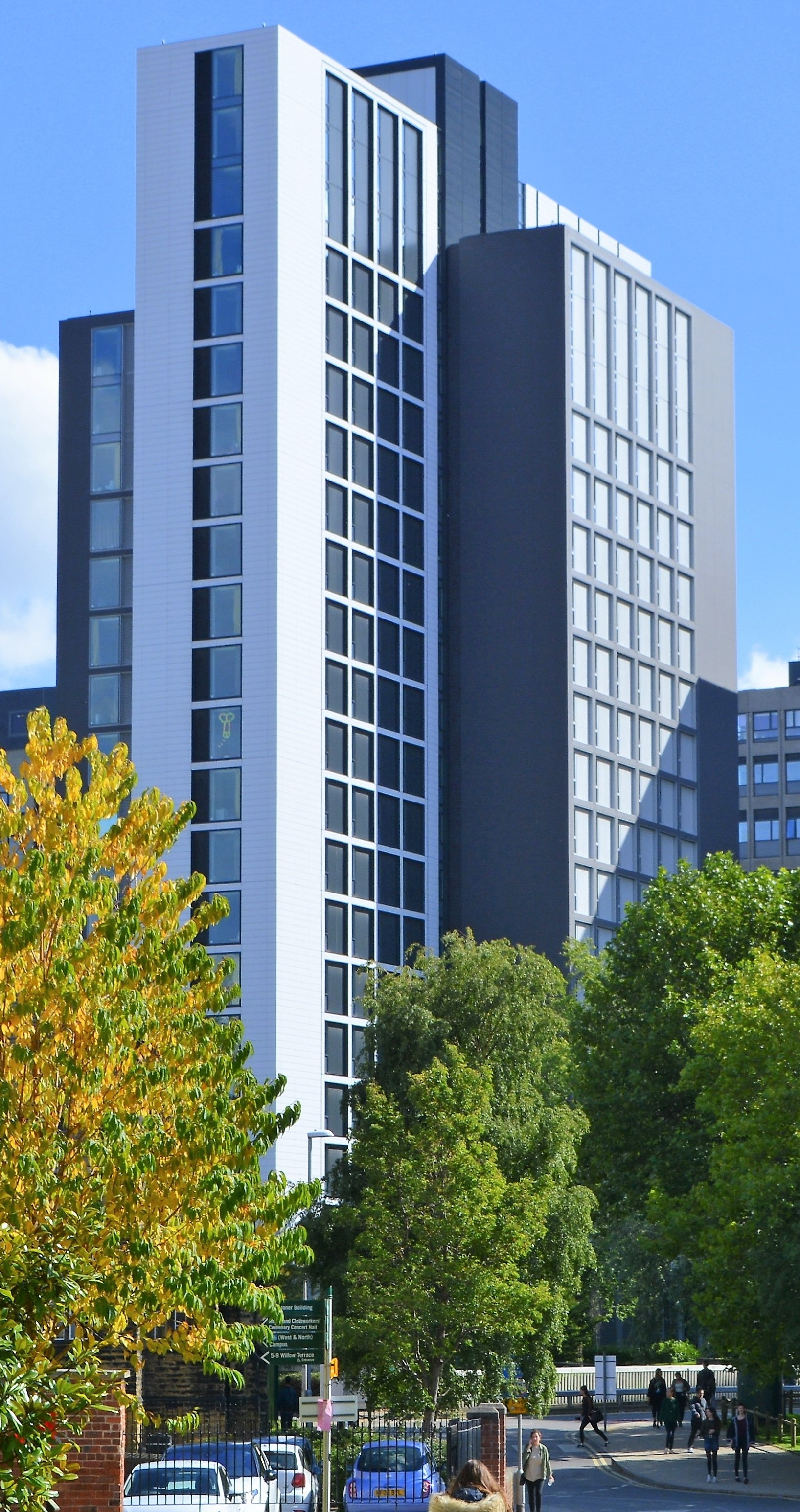
- Interactive map of the Central Village Tower area

General information
- Status: Completed
- Location: Leeds, West Yorkshire
- Coordinates: 53.804534°N 1.549411°W
- Construction started: 2013
- Completed: 2014

Height
- Roof: 70 metres (230 ft)

Technical details
- Floor count: 23

Design and construction
- Architect: John McAslan + Partners
- Developer: Downing

Central Village Tower is a 70-metre (230 ft) student accommodation tower in Leeds, West Yorkshire, England. The tower was built to provide an extra 404 cluster bedrooms to the city's current student market. The tower was also part of phase 2 of the development of Central Village, which provides around 1,000 student bedrooms and has been completed.

== Gallery ==
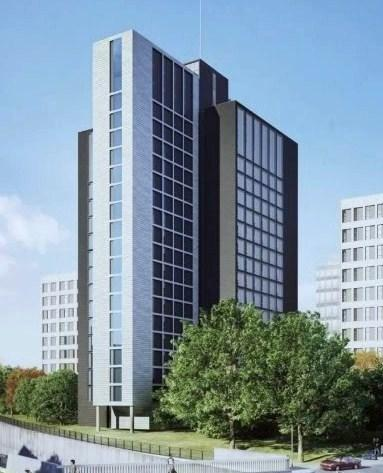

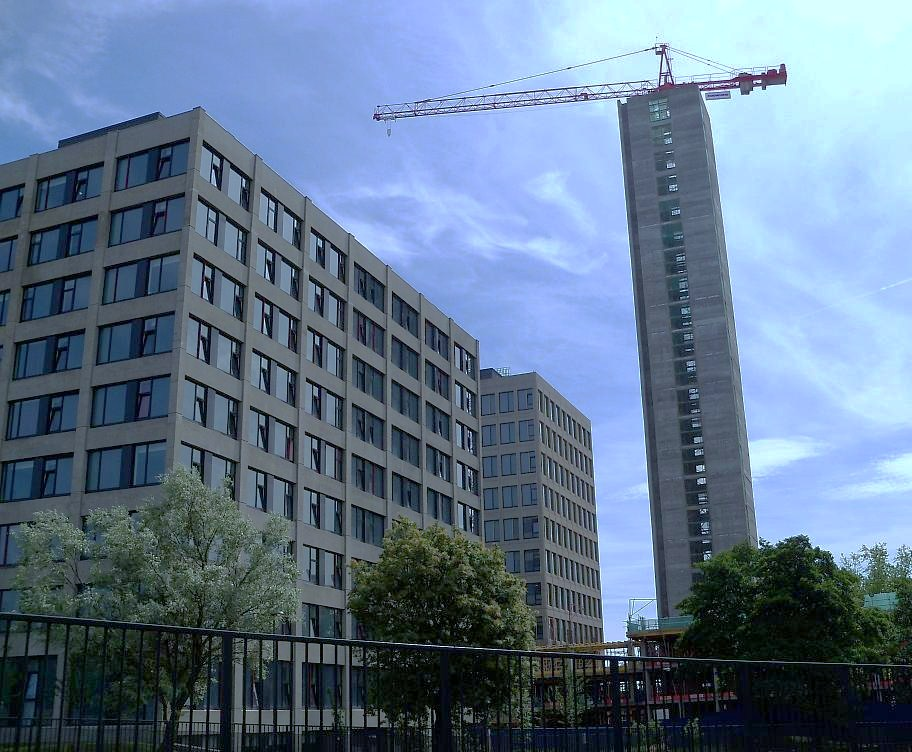

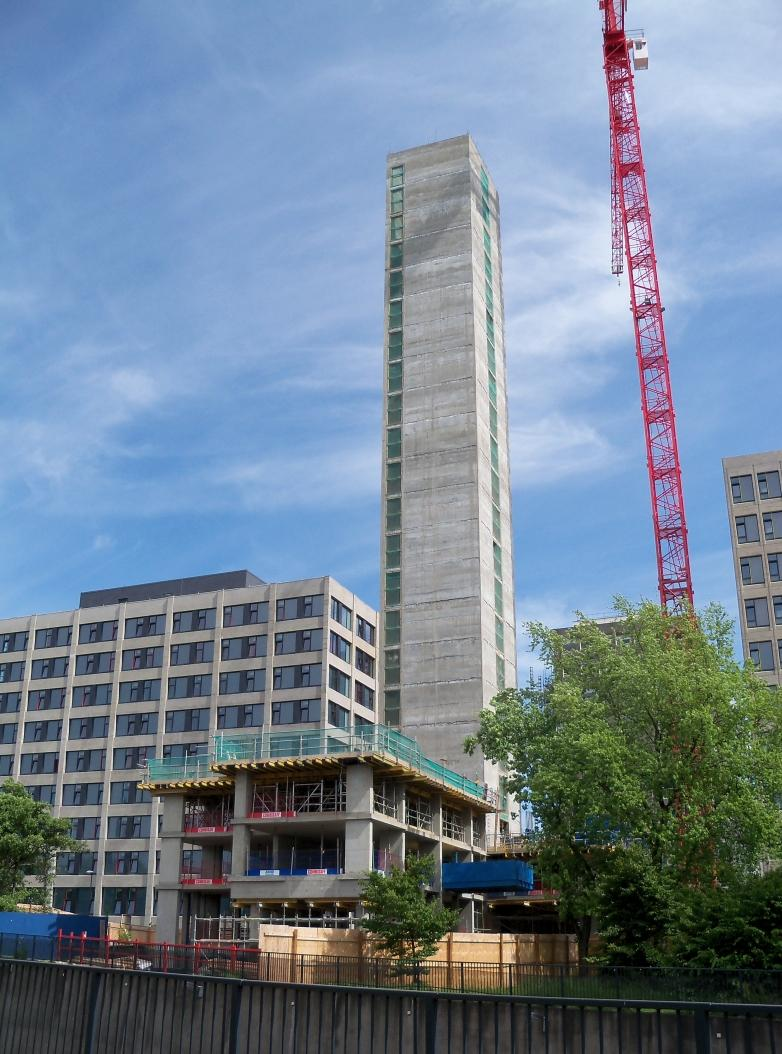

== See also ==
- List of tallest buildings in Leeds
- Architecture of Leeds
