= Arena Point =

Tower block in Leeds, England

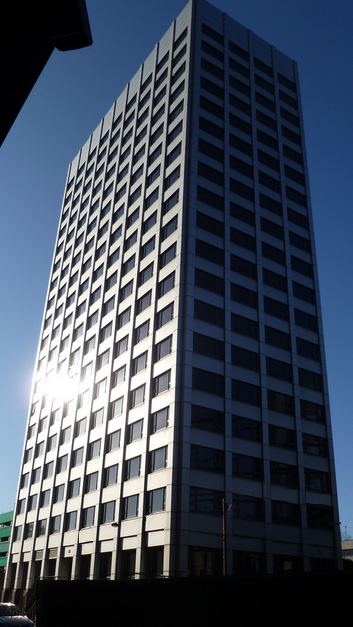
- Interactive map of the Arena Point area
- Alternative names: Tower North central

General information
- Status: Demolished
- Type: Tower
- Location: Leeds, England
- Coordinates: 53°48′14″N 1°32′38″W
- Construction started: 1967
- Completed: 1968
- Demolished: 2023

Height
- Antenna spire: 84 metres (276 ft)
- Roof: 77 metres (253 ft)

Technical details
- Floor count: 19

Arena Point (previously known as Tower North Central and Tower House) was a 77 metres (253 ft) high office tower in Leeds, England. It was situated at the top end of Leeds city centre on Merrion Way in close proximity to the Merrion Centre and was adjacent to the Opal 3 Tower. It was demolished in 2023, with its plot used to develop Yorkshire's tallest building Cirrus Point.

== History ==
The building was constructed in 1965 and with 19 floors was one of the tallest buildings in Leeds. Tower North Central was reclad in 1980, and refurbished in 2003–2004, and provided 76,800 sq ft (7,130 m^{2}) of office space. The building also benefitted from extensive on site parking with over 100 covered spaces available. The upper 11 floors were occupied by a variety of tenants following refurbishment whilst the lower seven floors and ground floor were excluded from the scheme as they were let to Axa at the time.

In 2020, plans were lodged with Leeds City Council to demolish the building and build a 43-storey student accommodation block in its place. Planning was agreed for the plot to be redeveloped during the COVID-19 pandemic, with demolition of Arena Point beginning in 2022. By late 2023, the building had been completely demolished, to make was for Yorkshire's tallest building, Cirrus Point. Upon completion, Cirrus would be 134 metres tall, spanning 45 stories.

== See also ==
- List of tallest buildings in Leeds
