= Centre North East =

Building in Middlesbrough, England

Coordinates: 54.5760°N 1.2350°W

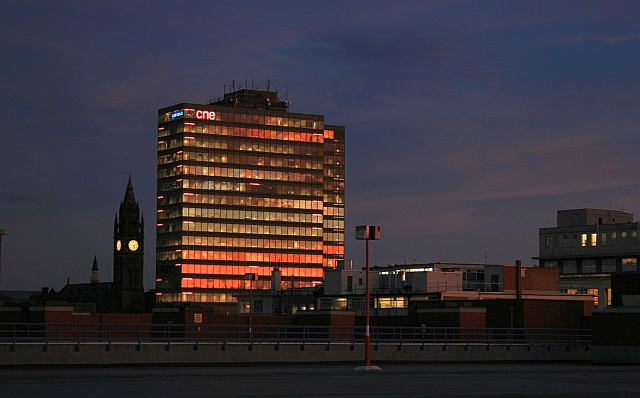
Centre North East

Centre North East, formerly Corporation House, was built in 1974. It is, at 19 storeys and 70.7 m (232 ft), the tallest building in Middlesbrough.

In 2004, Centre North East was fully let and sold to the Kenmore Property who went into administration late 2009.

A bowling alley, Lane7, operated in the building between 2017 and 2022.

A nightclub, Soho, operated in the basement of the venue for 7 years before closing in June 2023.

In early 2016, the building was bought by the Stockton-on-Tees based company, Cliff Court Developments. The firm subsequently began refurbishing the building.
