= Cottingley Towers and Cottingley Heights =

Two tower blocks in Leeds, West Yorkshire

Cottingley Towers (left) & Cottingley Heights (right)
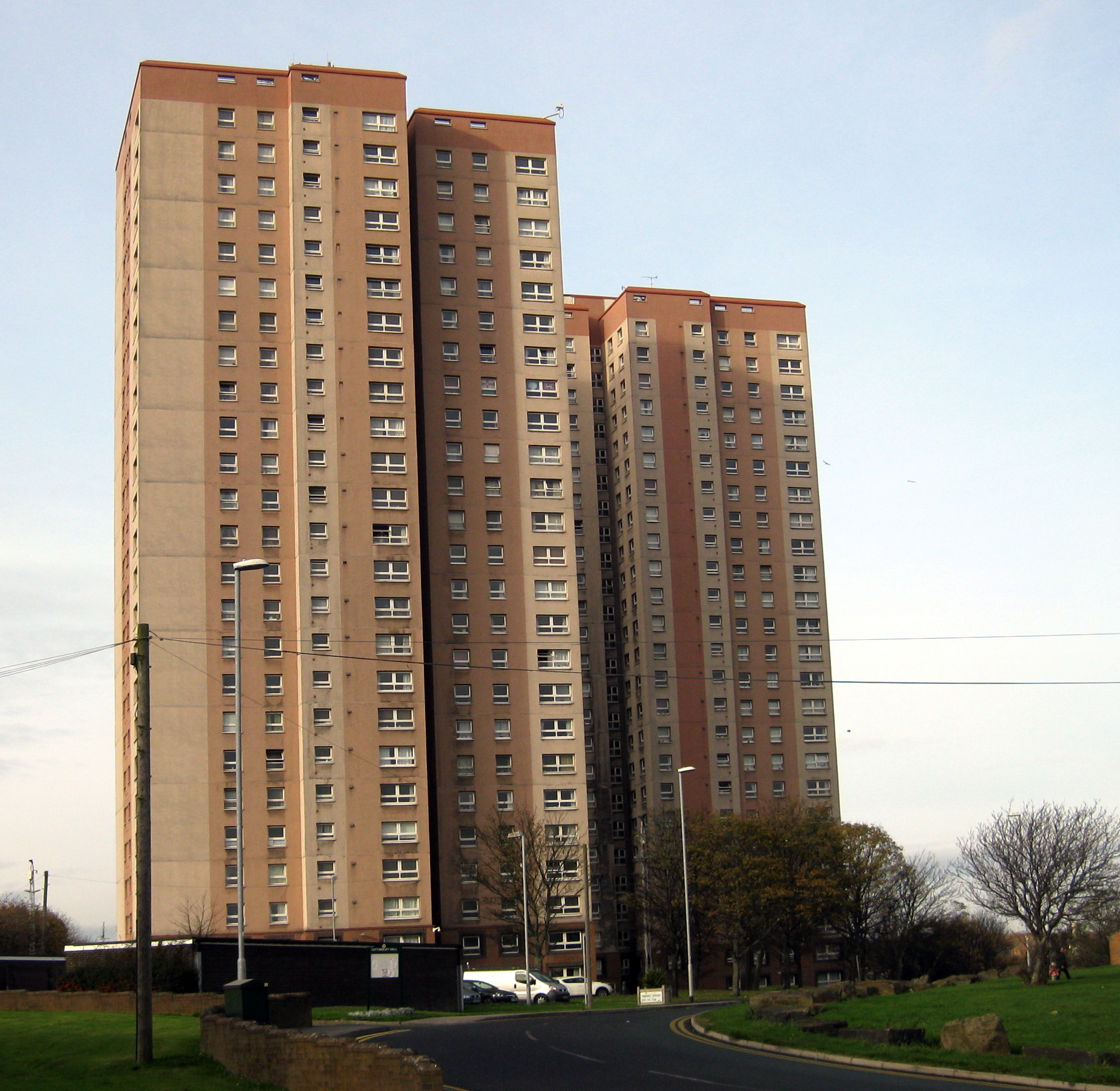

- Location within Leeds

General information
- Type: Residential
- Location: Cottingley, Leeds, Cottingley Vale, Leeds LS11 0JH, Leeds, England
- Coordinates: 53.7692°N 1.5829°W
- Current tenants: 100+
- Construction started: 1971
- Completed: 1972
- Renovated: 1989
- Owner: Leeds City Council

Height
- Height: 72 metres (236 ft)

Technical details
- Floor count: 25
- Lifts/elevators: 2

Cottingley Towers & Cottingley Heights are twin high-rise towers of rented-flat accommodation on top of a hill in Cottingley, Leeds, West Yorkshire, England. Cottingley Towers & Cottingley Heights were previously the tallest residential buildings in Leeds, with 25 floors each. The towers are 72 metres (236 ft) tall but are not classed as skyscrapers. They were built between 1971-2 and were refurbished in 1989.

The towers were once heralded as the tallest residential buildings in Europe. Much has been done to address crime in the area and levels of crime have subsided notably over the past 10 years. When built, it was decided not to put a flat number 13 in either block as some regard 13 to be unlucky, and this was also the first time buildings of this design had been constructed. The Towers and Heights fall within the Beeston and Holbeck ward of the Leeds City Council.
