= The Leeds Look =

Style of Modern Architecture

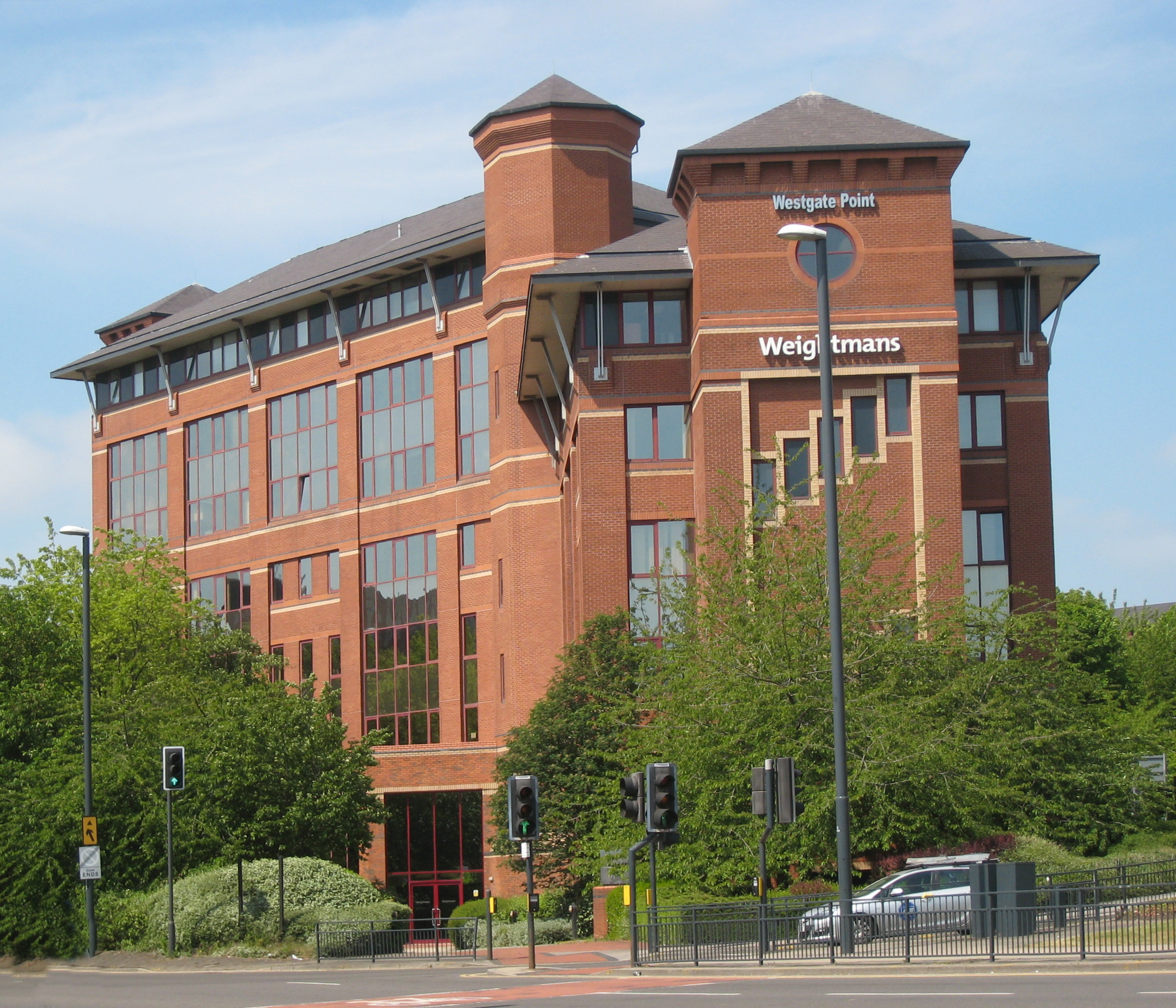
Westgate Point

The Leeds Look is a modern architectural style using red brick and grey slate roofs used for public and commercial buildings in Leeds city centre. The first examples appeared in the 1980s with the goal of harmonising new buildings with older brick buildings surrounding them. The style is sufficiently widespread and recognisable that it forms a notable period in the Architecture of Leeds.

Leeds Civic Trust and the Leeds Society of Architects played a key role in the classification and discussion of the style. For example, their "The Leeds Look or Where is Architecture Going?" event in February 1990 documents that the term was widely understood among architects nationally as early as 1990.

== Origin ==
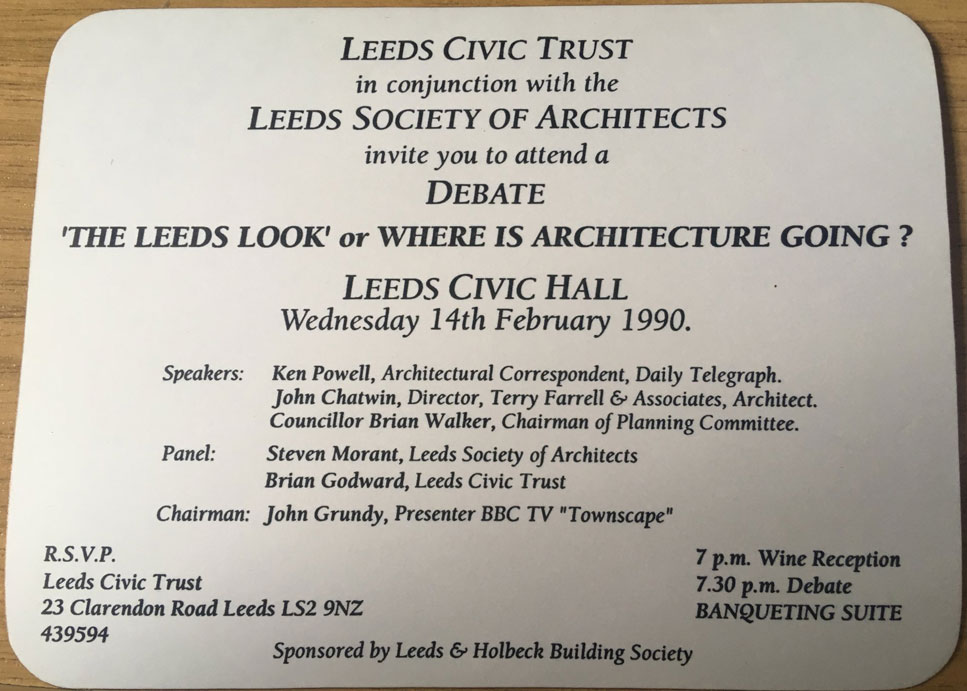
An invitation from The Leeds Civic Trust to a February 1990 event on "The Leeds Look".

In Leeds, the growth of the financial and business services sector from the mid-1980s onwards resulted in a boom in office developments in the city centre. Destruction of older buildings and insensitive development in the 1960s and 1970s caused the formation and development of Leeds Civic Trust, who successfully argued that the Leeds authority should endeavour to make new buildings be in keeping with the surroundings. Planning in Leeds changed from grand schemes sweeping away old buildings to what the city architect John Thorp described as "urban dentistry": removing old buildings which were not worth saving, filling in gaps, bridging and crowning. As many of the older industrial buildings were of brick with grey slate roofs, architects designed new ones in these traditional materials. Additions such as neo-historical detail of terracotta and stone associated with the city's Victorian and Edwardian eras were often approved by Leeds' planners. This style was intended to derive from Leeds’ Victorian heritage and provide visual coherence with older buildings, and was especially used in the city centre and in developments around the waterfront.

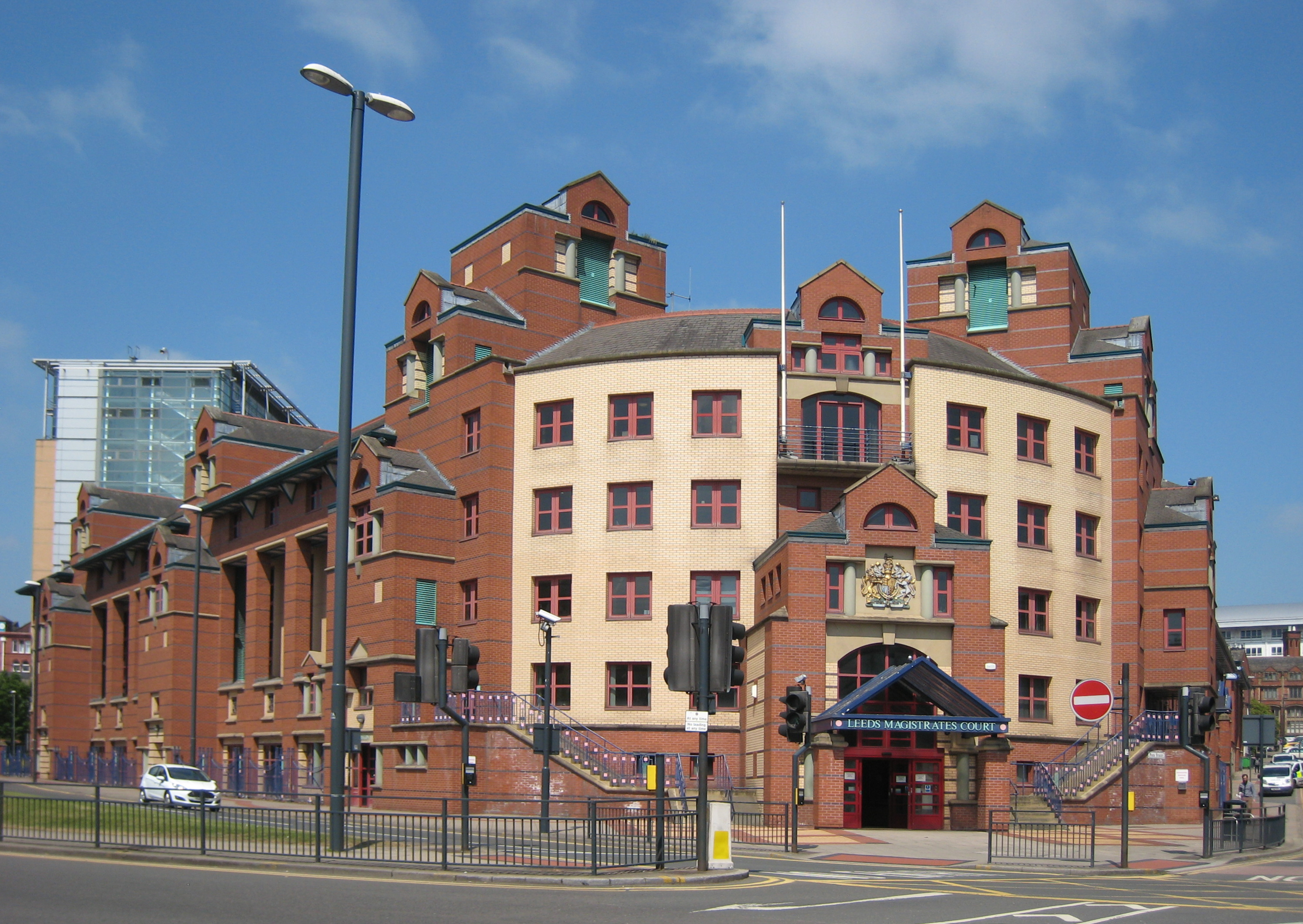
Leeds Magistrates' Court, Westgate

Dr Kevin Grady, the director of Leeds Civic Trust, described the Leeds Look as “an interim response in the 1980s for architecture that had a human scale and was pleasing on the eye following some of the mistakes of the 1960s and 70s.” Westgate Point has been said to be the best example.

Later developments of the style include Quarry House (1993) and Leeds Magistrates' Court (1994). Dr Grady described the Magistrates Court building as the highlight of the style; “I am sure in the future the courts will be a listed building. It is visually interesting, if a little eccentric, and is much better than the other buildings in this style that are rather bland.”

In the late 1990s the style was being overtaken by more strikingly modern architecture such as Number 1, City Square.

== Criticism ==
The style received praise for being in keeping with older buildings and its "stylish use of red brick" but also criticism, such as from architectural critic Ken Powell who said that “this style has been imposed with monotonous thoroughness and a marked dearth of imagination”. Others describe the style as a “bland reinterpretation of former warehouse style”. It has been said that Leeds city planners became "almost infamous" for insisting that new schemes should interpret the style of its Victorian riverfront warehouses in this way.

Particular criticism has been levelled at the Crowne Plaza Hotel on Wellington Street as being a “missed opportunity” and “a bland exercise in facadism, complete with badly proportioned towers, archways and pediments, supposedly based upon earlier brick warehouses, architecture whose structural integrity it manages to both mimic and mock”.

== Gallery ==
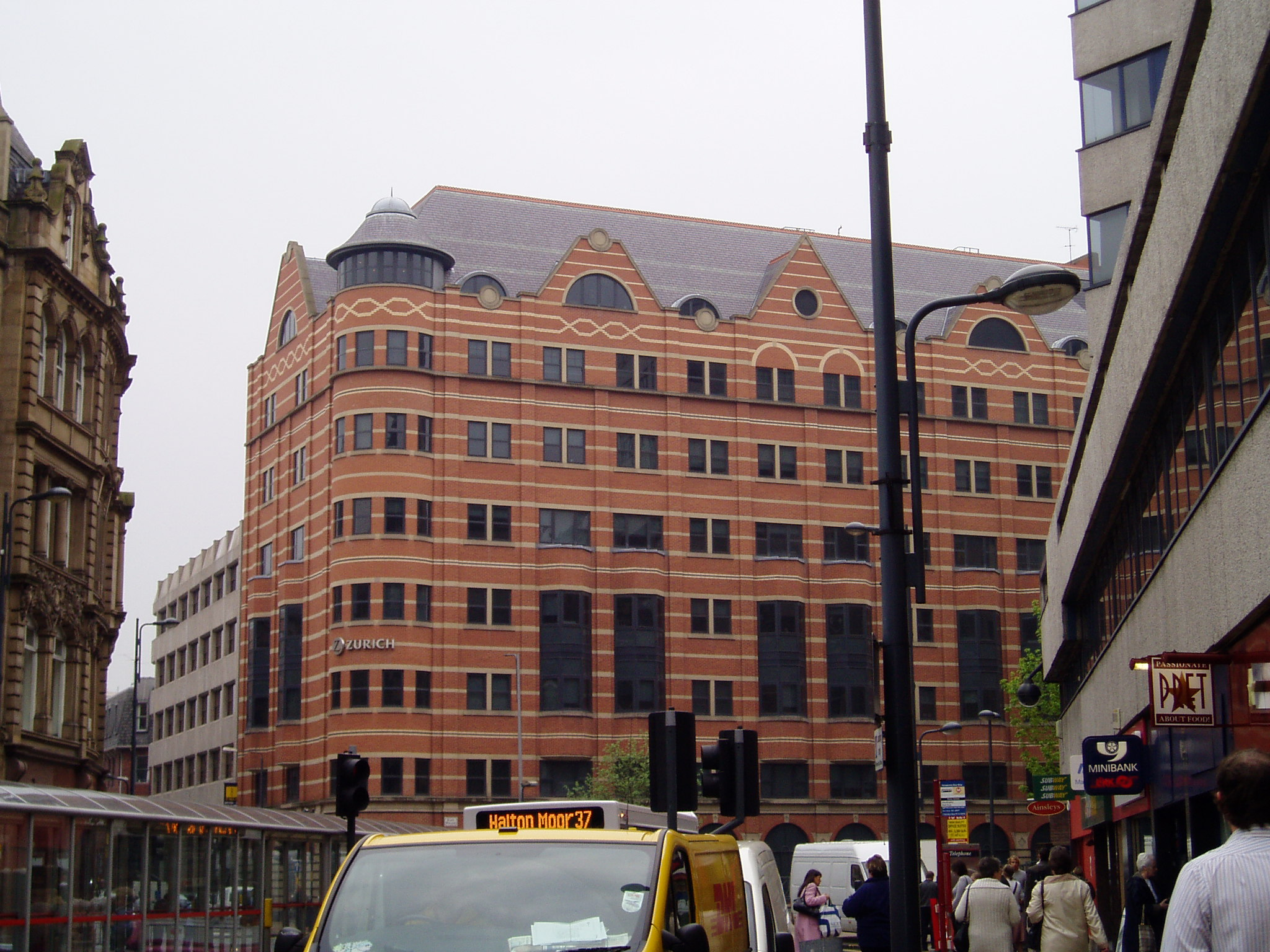
1 East Parade

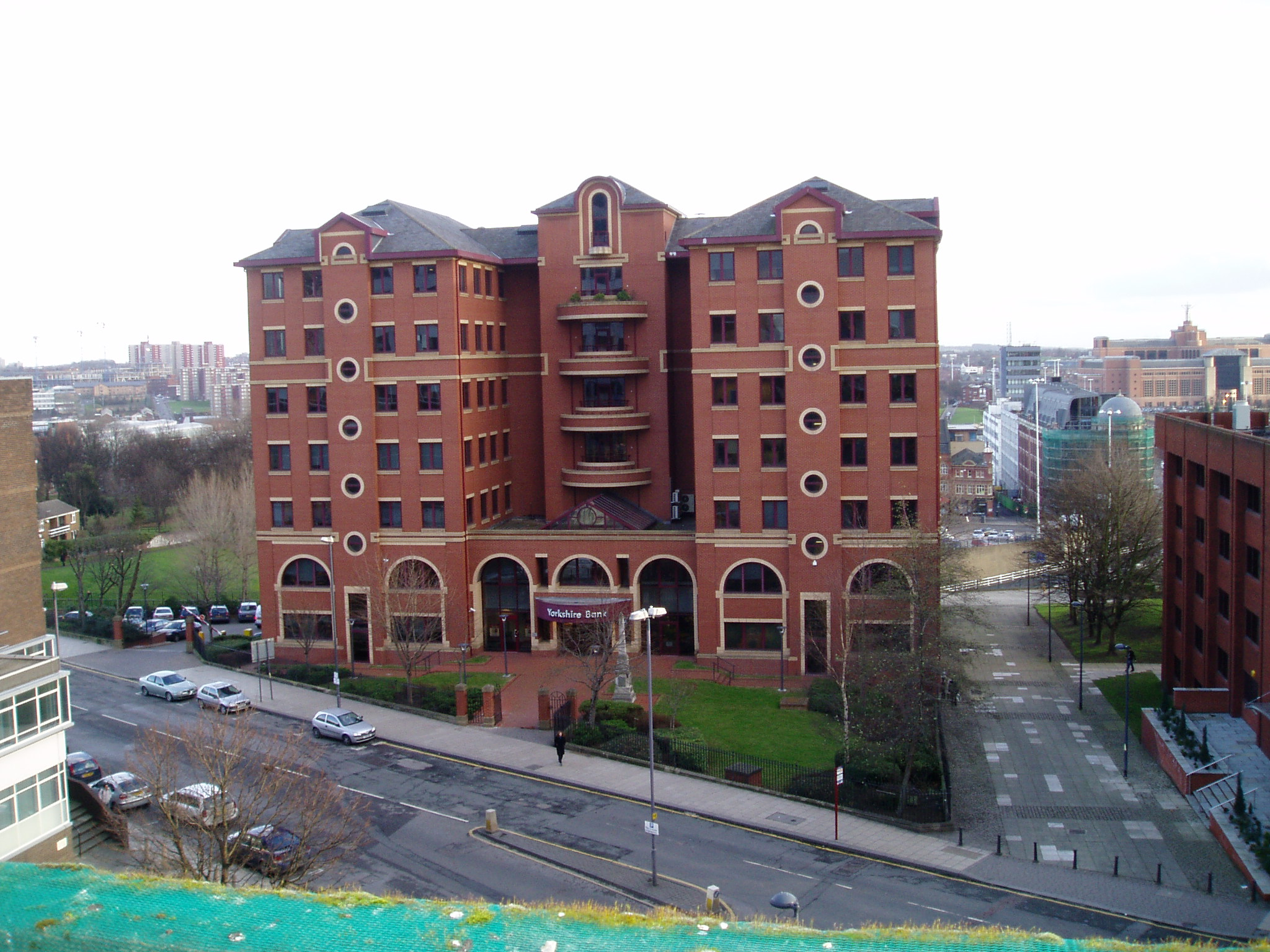
Yorkshire Bank Offices, Wade Lane

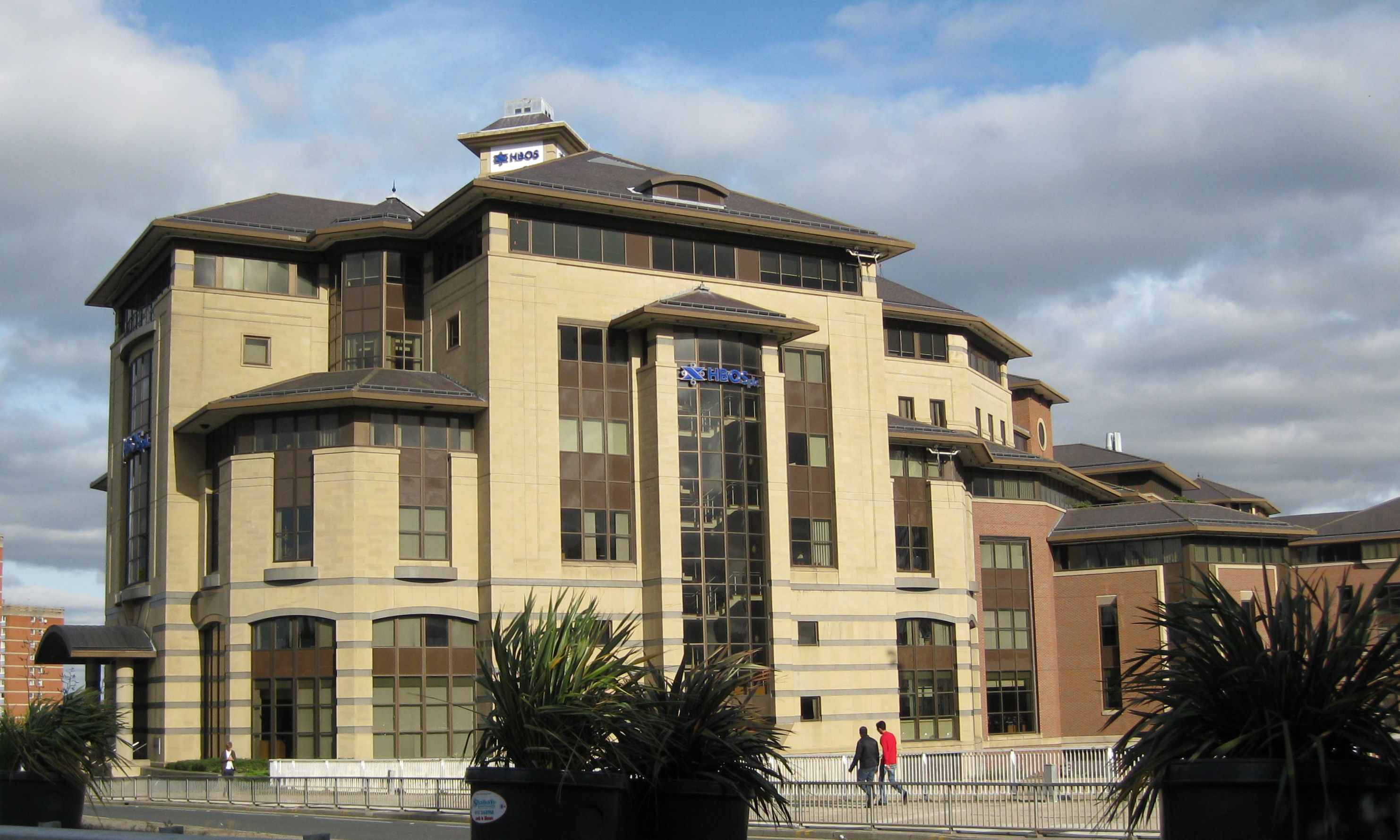
HBOS Offices, Lovell Park Road (originally red brick, reclad)

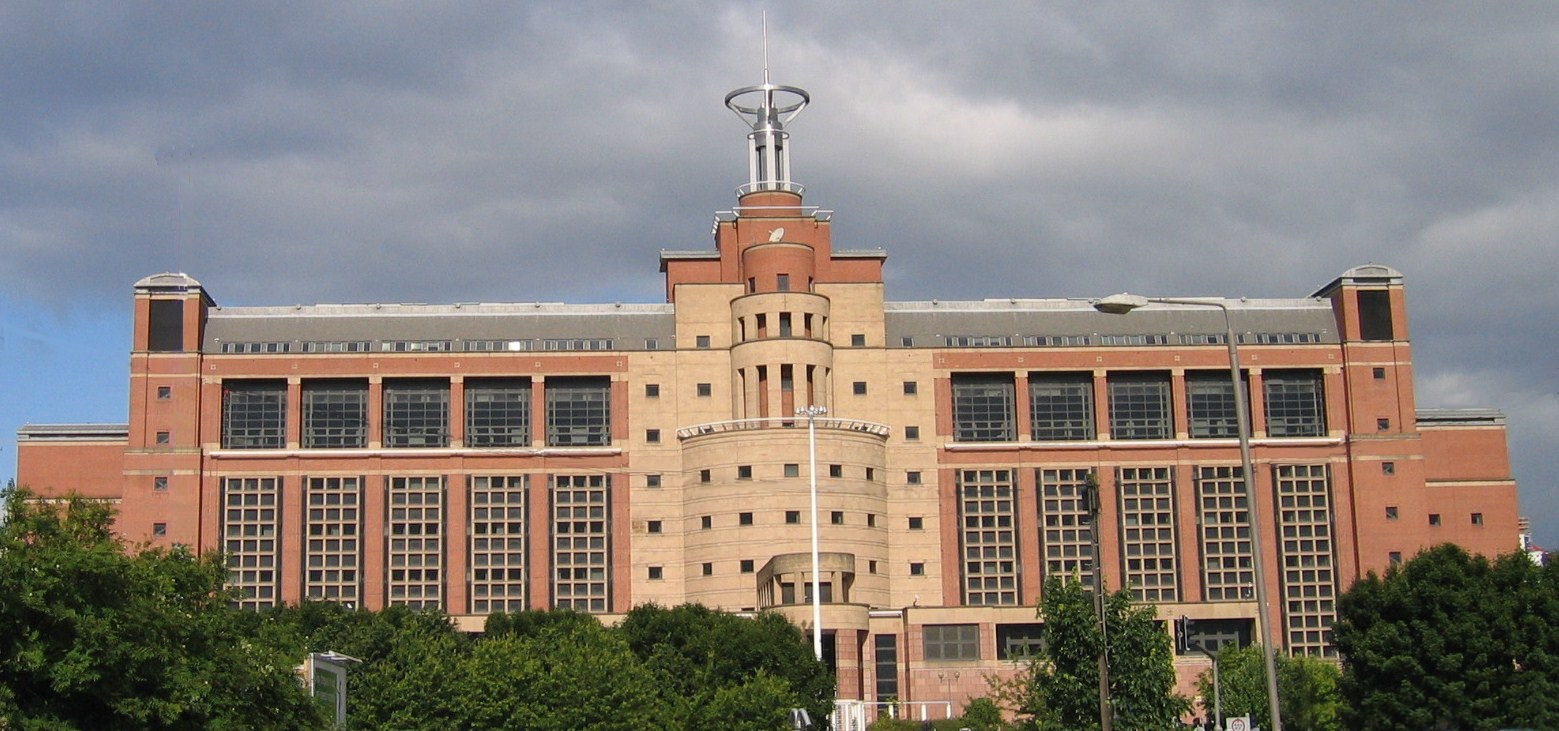
Quarry House, Quarry Hill

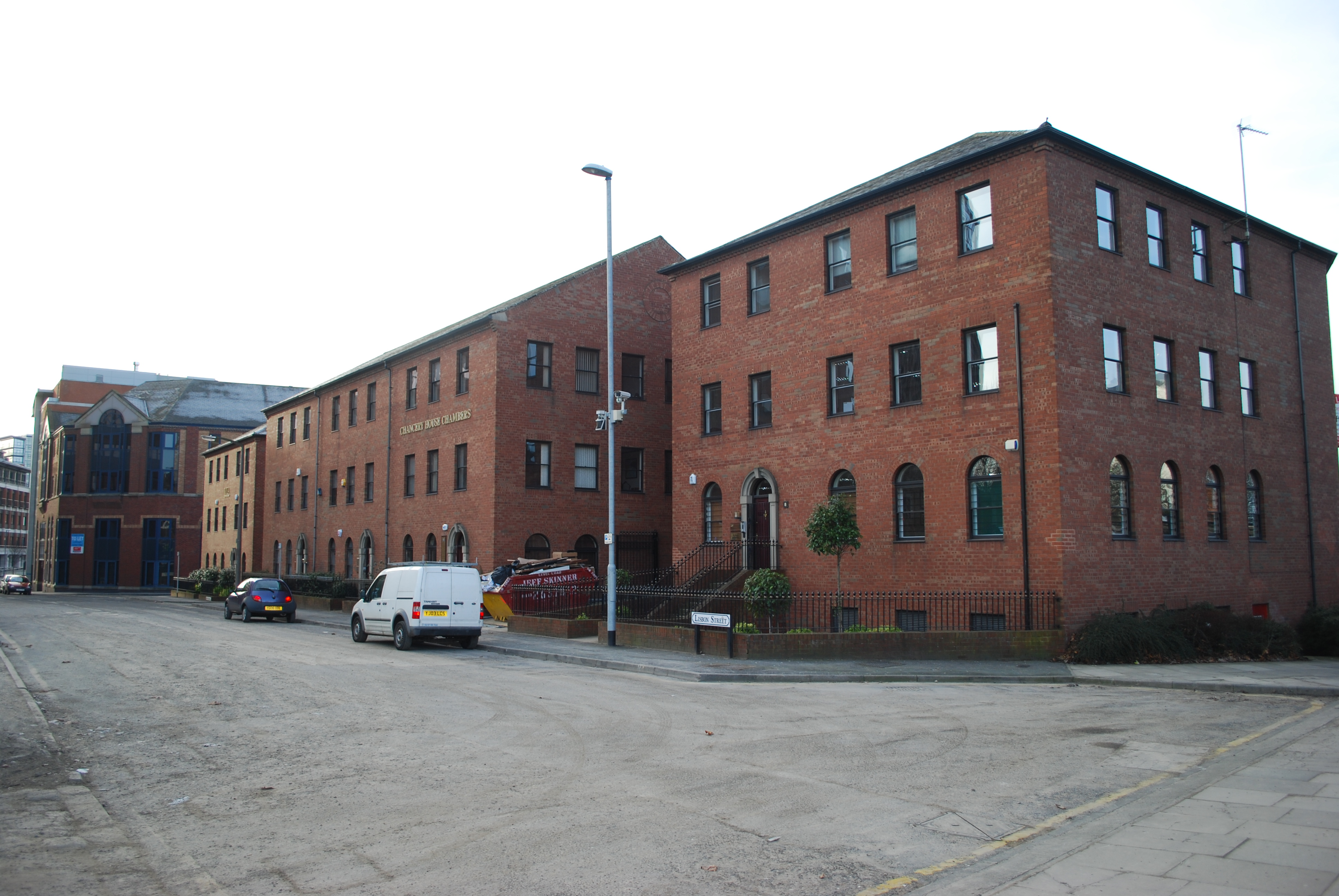
Lisbon Street

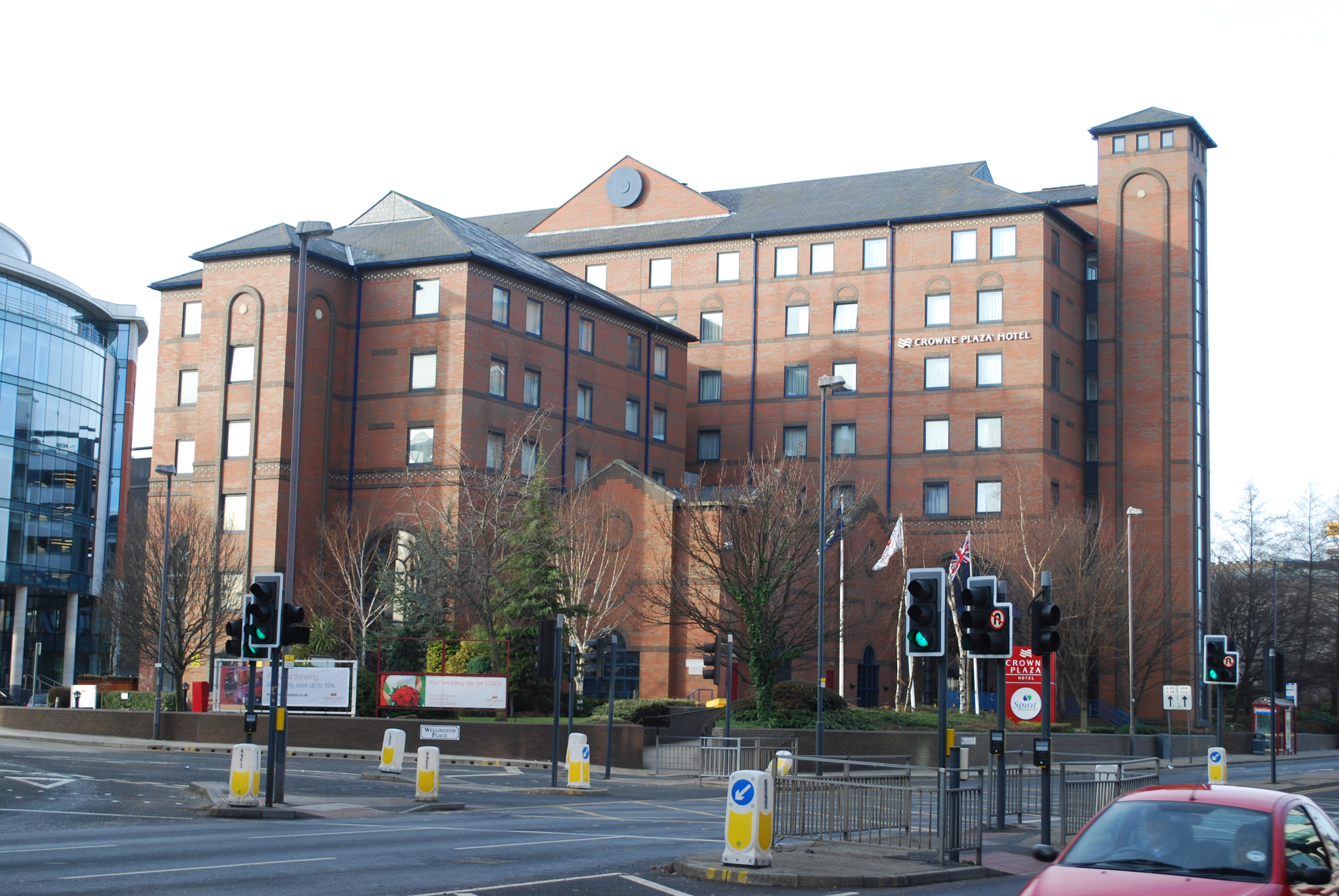
Crowne Plaza Hotel, Wellington Street

== See also ==
- Architecture of Leeds
