= Architecture of Leeds =

Buildings of Leeds, West Yorkshire, England

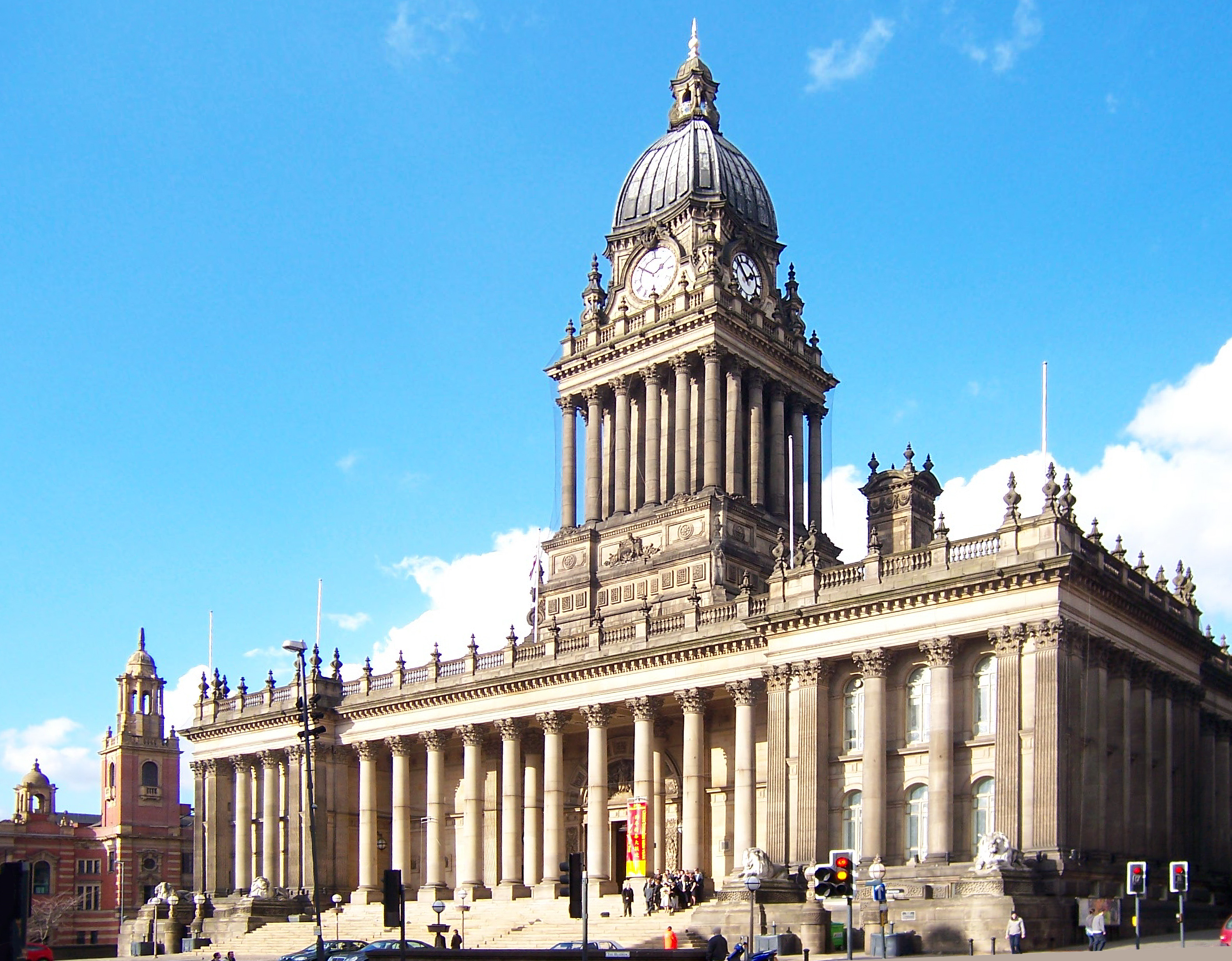
Leeds Town Hall, an example of Victorian architecture. It was built for Leeds Corporation between 1853 and 1858.

The architecture of Leeds, a city and metropolitan borough in West Yorkshire, England, encompasses a wide range of architectural styles and notable buildings. As with most northern industrial centres, much of Leeds' prominent architecture is of the Victorian era. However, the City of Leeds also contains buildings from as early as the Middle Ages such as Kirkstall Abbey, one of Britain's best preserved ruined Cistercian monasteries, as well as examples of 20th century industrial architecture, particularly in the districts of Hunslet and Holbeck.

Most of the current buildings in Leeds are the product of the Industrial Revolution and post war regeneration in the 20th century, as many new buildings were provided in the city's commuter towns and villages to house the increasing suburban population. Leeds city centre is currently undergoing much redevelopment, with a number of skyscrapers such as Bridgewater Place and Altus House. Many buildings in Leeds have won awards for their architecture: examples are the renovation projects for the Corn Exchange and the Henry Moore Institute, which have won RIBA awards.

== Materials of construction ==
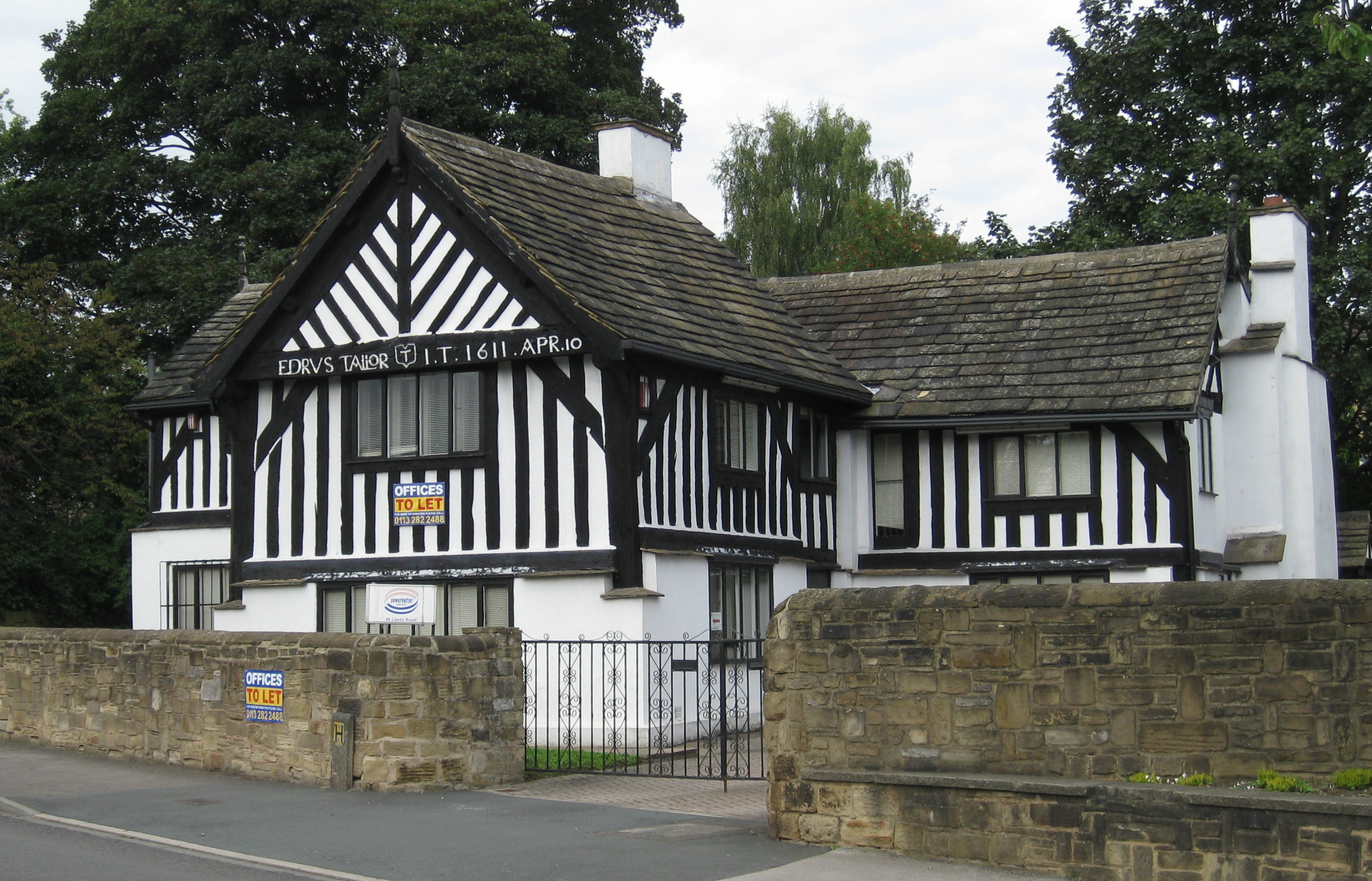
The Nook, Oulton LS26

Before modern times, buildings were usually constructed of local materials, including wood, thatch etc. The Nook in Oulton (dated 1611) is a rare example of an original half-timbered house. Of the more durable materials, there are three rocks which have been substantially used. These are gritstone (a sort of sandstone) found to the north and west (e.g. Kirkstall Abbey, Leeds Town Hall or Harewood House), different sandstones in the Yorkshire Coal Measures, and limestone to the north and east, as is shown in older villages (now suburbs) in these directions. To the south of the city are substantial clay deposits, so that red brick has been the predominant building material for the extensive nineteenth century housing. The particularly fine clay found in Burmantofts led to a decorative covering of terracotta or glazed Architectural Faience being used on both interior and exterior walls of important buildings.

In the twentieth century, new building methods, particularly concrete and steel were used, and the exterior was essentially facing. Thus materials from further away could be used, such as the Portland stone used on the Leeds Civic Hall, the Parkinson Building of the University of Leeds and the Queens Hotel.

== Pre 1600 ==
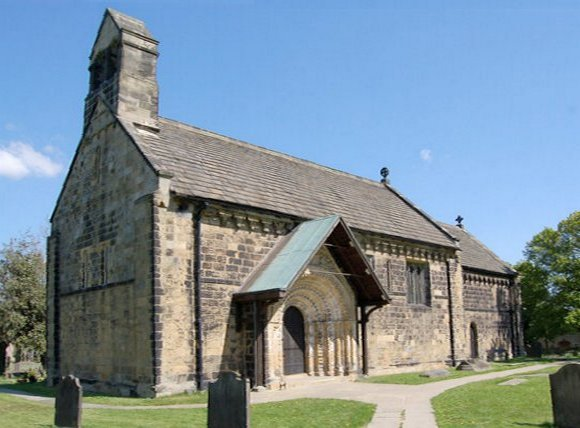
St John the Baptist Church, Adel

The earliest evidence of civilisation in the area of Leeds is at Seacroft and dates to 3500 BC. The oldest existent man-made structure in the Leeds metropolitan district is the earthworks of the Iron Age fort at Barwick in Elmet. Leeds is thought to have been the site of the Roman town of Cambodunum, abandoned when the Romans left Britain in around 400 AD. The first church in Leeds is thought to have been built around 600 AD.

Leeds, like many industrial cities, has little remaining medieval architecture. The lack of Medieval architecture in central Leeds may be attributed to the small size of the town during the majority of the period, the population usually being around 1,000. At the time there were several larger settlements in Yorkshire such as Wakefield and York.

The Church of St John the Baptist at Adel is one of the earliest remaining buildings in Leeds. It was built of gritstone with slate roofs between 1150 and 1170. It has been described as "one of the best and most complete Norman village churches in Yorkshire".

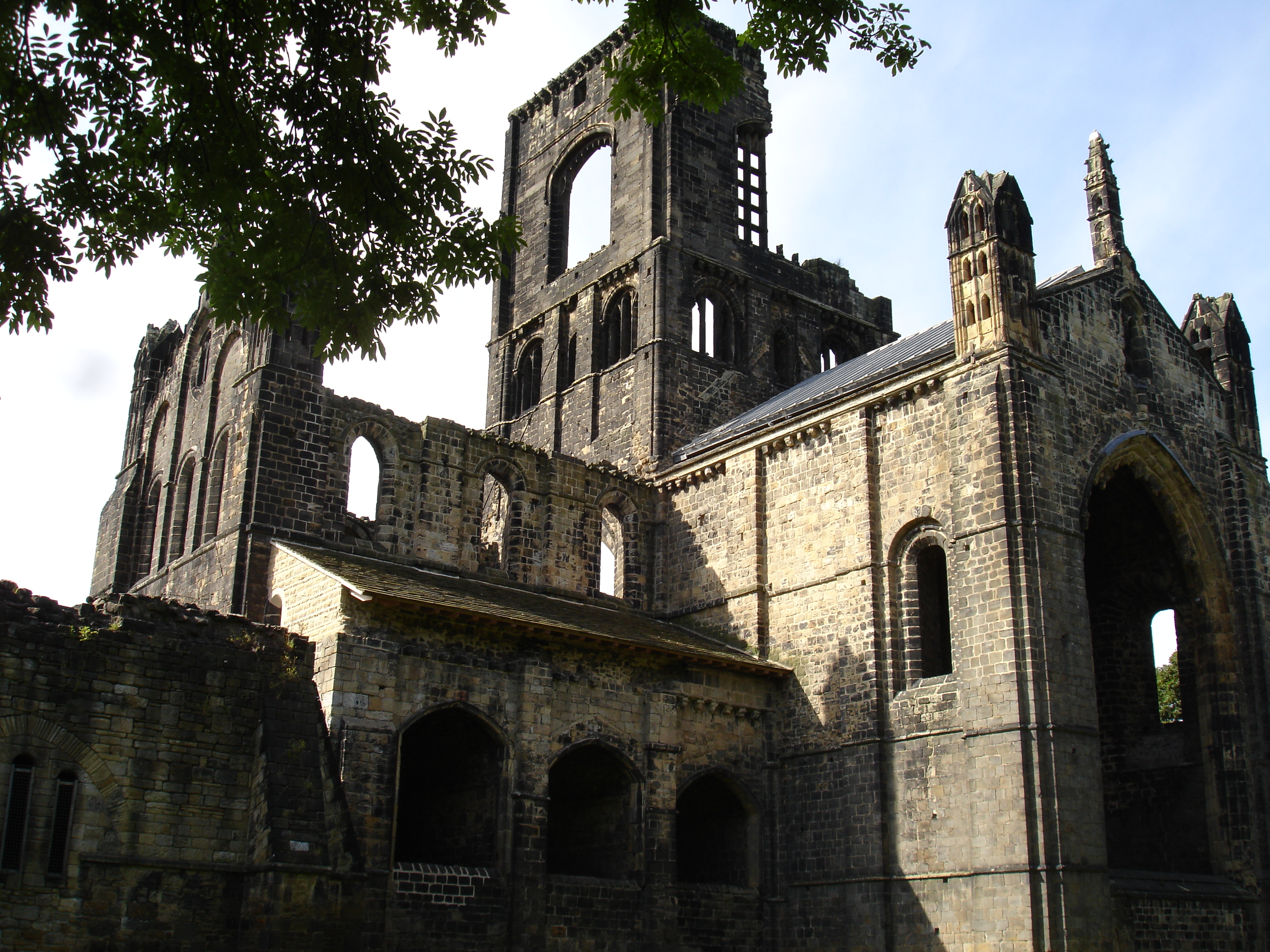
Kirkstall Abbey

Kirkstall Abbey is the most noteworthy piece of architecture from this period in Leeds. The abbey, which is a Cistercian foundation, was begun on the banks of the River Aire in 1152. The abbey was disbanded and the buildings ruined during the dissolution of the monasteries under Henry VIII. Although Cistercian abbeys were numerous in England, many were located in remote areas and, unlike several Benedictine and Augustinian abbeys, did not survive the Dissolution by being reused as parish churches. At Kirkstall Abbey, the ruins are particularly well preserved and show an austere form of Norman architecture with some later Gothic additions and embellishments. The remnants of most of the monastic buildings are sufficiently intact to display the domestic arrangement and function of the monastery. The Abbey House Museum keeps records and displays artefacts from the abbey as well as from other eras across Leeds. Paintings of the Abbey have come from artists as renowned as J. M. W. Turner and Thomas Girtin. In 1889 the abbey was purchased by Colonel John North and presented to Leeds City Council. The council restored parts of the abbey and made it safe for public enjoyment before opening it in 1895.

Although central Leeds has few buildings from the Middle Ages, there are examples within the City of Leeds boundaries, including two at Wetherby. Wetherby Bridge dates from the Medieval period, but has been considerably altered, the pointed Gothic arches of different heights being replaced by semi-circular arches. It is said that the Bishop of York granted absolution of sins to local residents in return for building the bridge.

The building of a castle was commenced in Wetherby in 1140, but it was demolished in 1155, because it was the King had not granted permission for its construction. The remains of its foundations can still be seen, and it is remembered in the street name "Castle Gate". Harewood Castle is a 14th-century stone hall house and courtyard fortress, in the grounds of Harewood House. It is a Grade I listed and is currently undergoing conservation.

== 1600 to 1800 ==
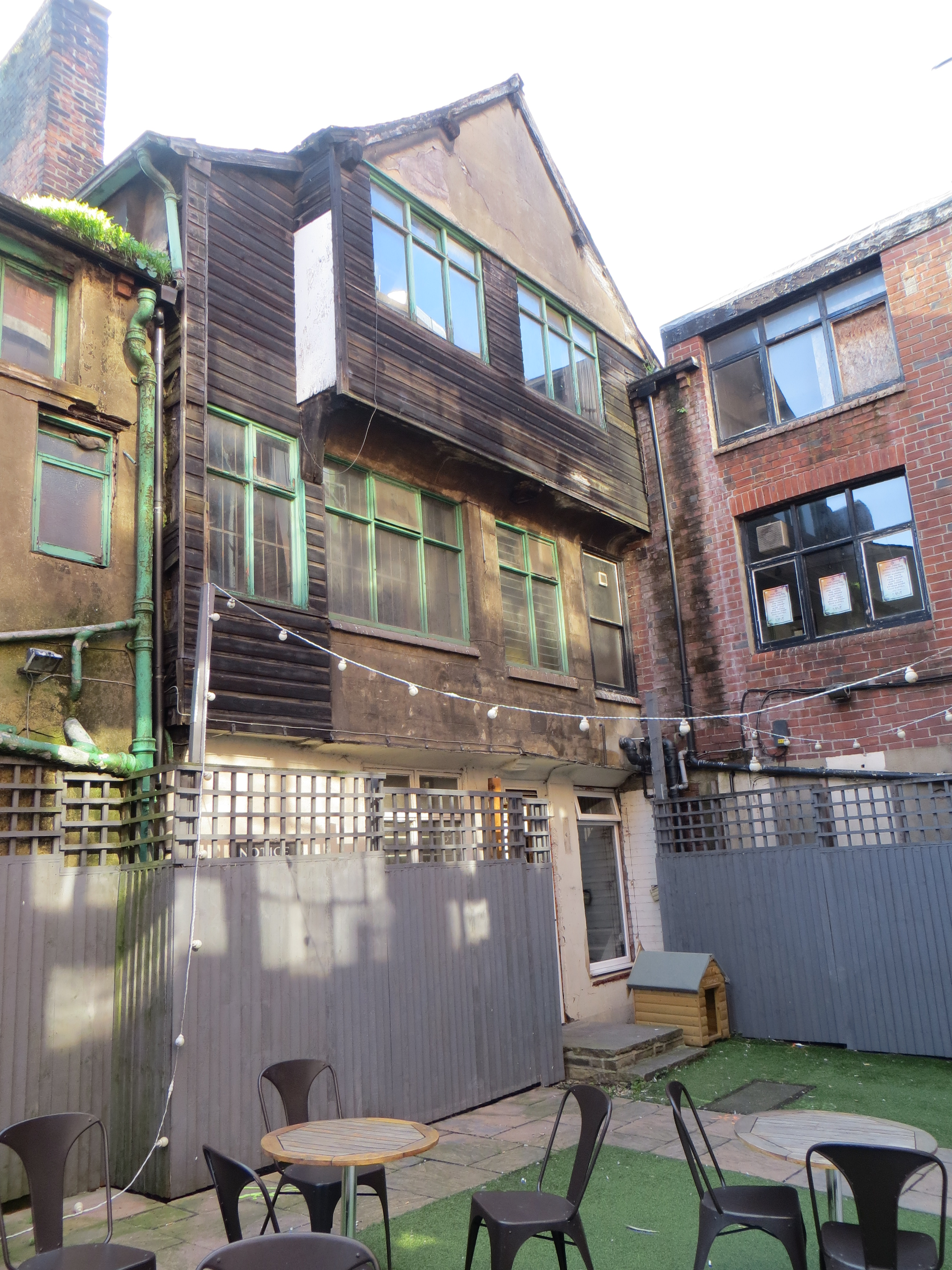
Lambert's Yard, the oldest building in the city centre

By Tudor times, Leeds had become a market town of about 3,000 people, which grew to about 6,000 by the mid-17th century, however successive redevelopments of the city centre in the following centuries have destroyed almost all visible evidence of this period. The earliest building remaining in the city centre is a late 16th- or early 17th-century house in Lambert's Yard, off Briggate. It is a timber-framed building with a gable and three jettied storeys, "possibly the cross-wing of a larger hall house". It is in a state of disrepair and is not generally accessible to the public.

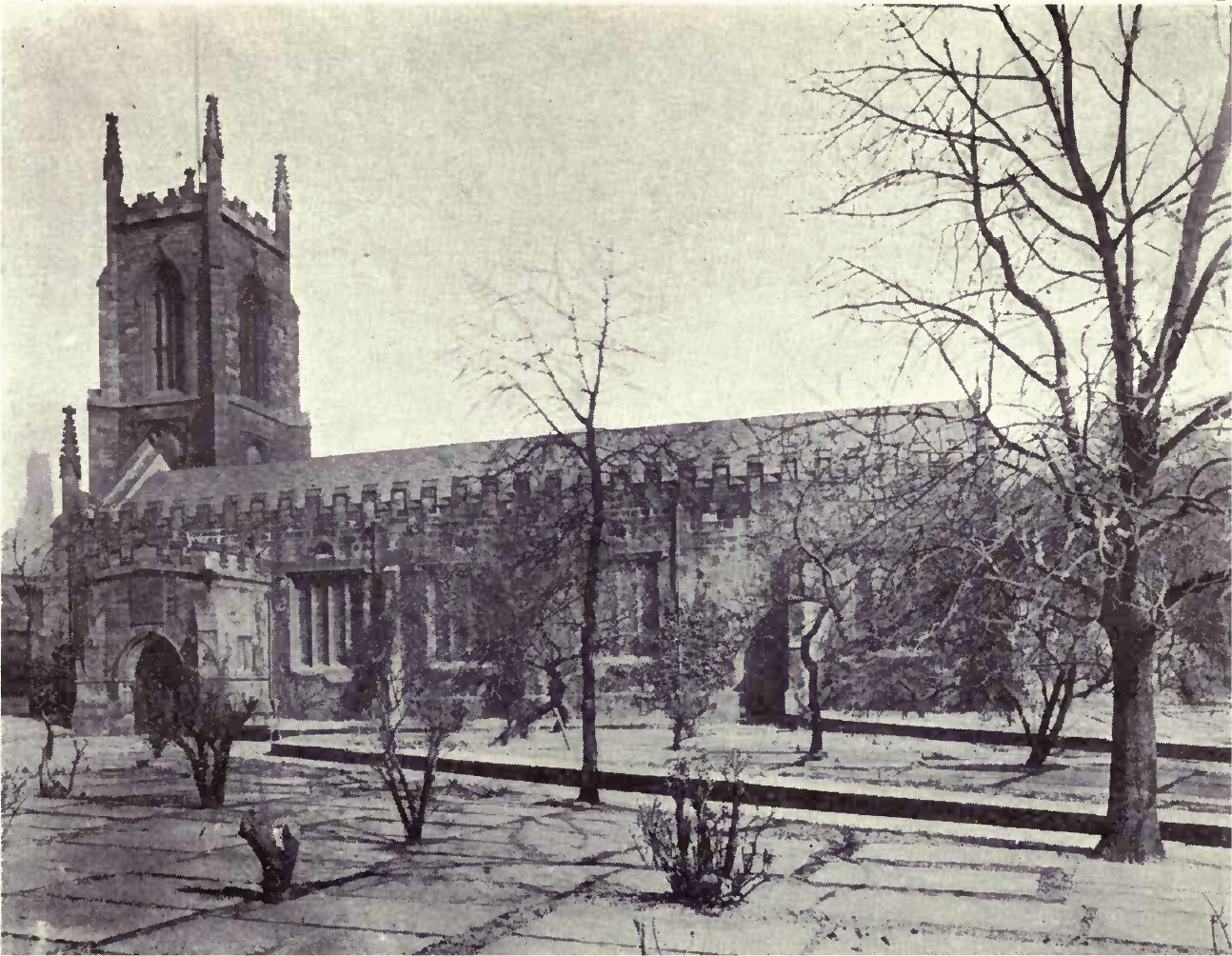
St John's church, seen c. 1919

The church of St John the Evangelist, New Briggate, is the oldest church in central Leeds, consecrated in 1634. It was founded by John Harrison. It is described as "something of an architectural rarity: a virtually intact 17th century church". In 1865 there were plans to demolish it, but Norman Shaw came to its defence and argued successfully for its restoration. Its interior is unusual in having two naves, and it has a large amount of Jacobean woodwork. It is no longer used for regular services but is in the care of the Churches Conservation Trust and is regularly open for visitors and also used for occasional public events.

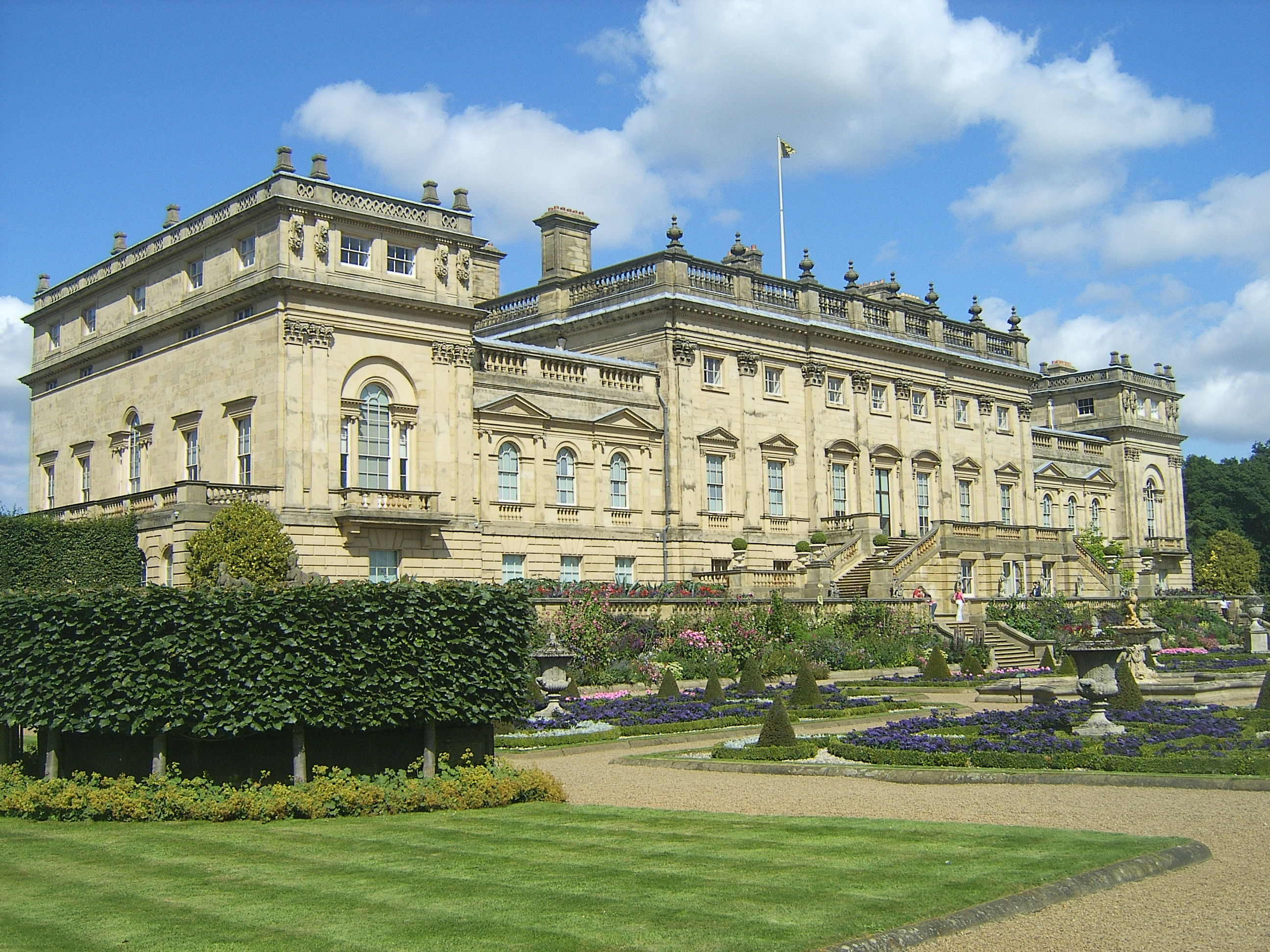
Harewood House

A major example of 18th century architecture lies just outside the city (although within the City of Leeds boundaries) in the Grade I listed Harewood House. This was built between 1759 and 1771 and funded from the proceeds of the West Indian Slave Trade. The architect was John Carr of York, with extensions by Robert Adam who also designed the interiors.

The opening of a trade hall in Wetherby in 1710 brought about further industrial development, most of this was still on a small scale until the 19th century, but Leeds like Manchester began to show growing industrialisation before many other towns and cities across the industrial belts of Yorkshire and Lancashire did, providing Leeds with a few rare examples of industry from before the period that is generally accepted as the beginning of the industrial revolution (late 18th century) had begun.

Armley Mills was built in 1788 and is currently the largest woollen mill museum. There are several examples of industrial architecture from the latter part of this era in Holbeck, Hunslet, Armley and areas surrounding Leeds city centre. The Granary Buildings date from the same period.

The main infirmary was originally on Infirmary Street (near City Square and Quebec Street). Designed by John Carr, it was built in 1768–1771 and demolished in 1893 to make way for the Yorkshire Penny Bank.

Holy Trinity Church on Boar Lane was constructed between 1721 and 1727, built to a design by William Etty. It is a Grade I listed building. The building has not changed much (although a new steeple was built in 1839 by R D Chantrell), but developments such as the Burton Arcade and the Leeds Shopping Plaza have been built so close that it is difficult to see the full exterior of the building as was once possible.

In 2007 it was reported in the Yorkshire Evening Post that the remains of a 17th-century cottage in Alwoodley had been demolished after controversial approval from Leeds City Council.

== Nineteenth century ==
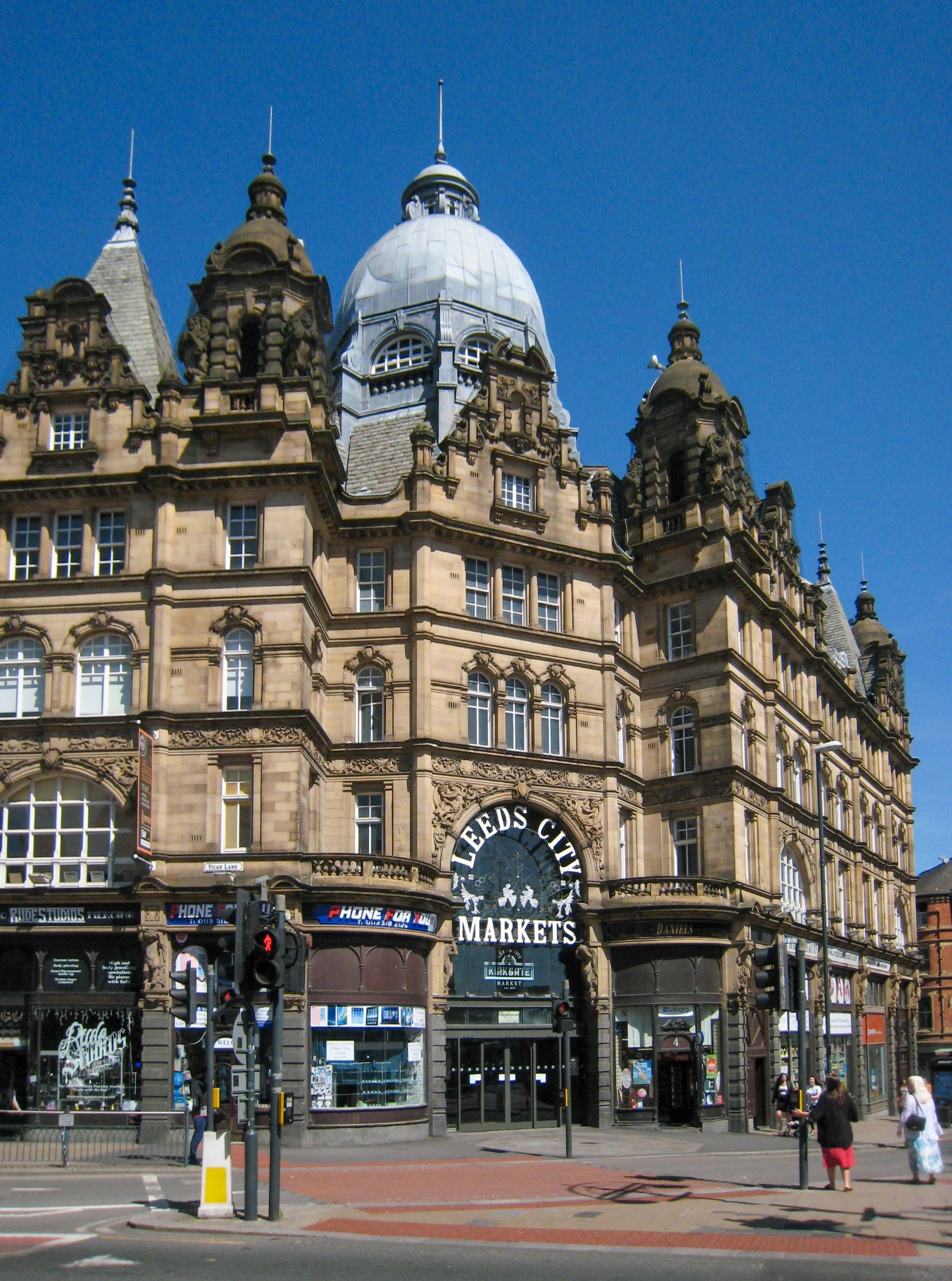
The Vicar Lane entrance to Leeds Kirkgate Market

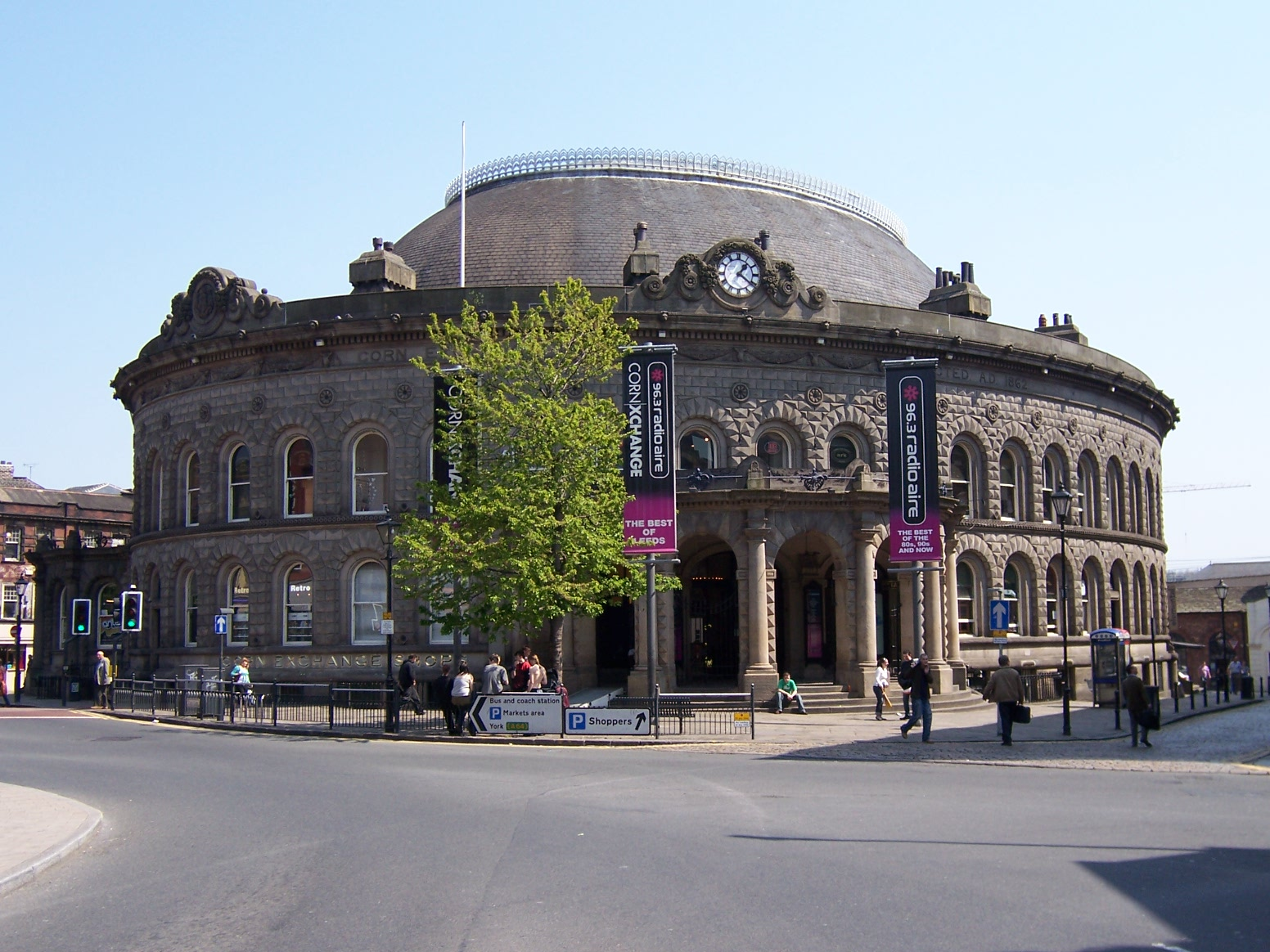
Leeds Corn Exchange

It was in the 19th century that Leeds began to grow into one of Britain's largest cities. This led to widespread building across the city. Leeds' wool and cloth trades resulted in the building of many industrial buildings during this era. The resulting workforce which migrated to the city from rural areas brought about the building of many houses. Leeds has perhaps the most surviving examples of back-to-back terrace housing in the UK, particularly in Holbeck and Harehills.

Headingley Castle, also known for a good deal of the 19th century as The Elms, was designed in about 1841 on land that had been owned by Barbara Marshall. It was built between 1843 and 1846 by the local architect John Child for the corn merchant Thomas England. The estate was originally 22 acres. While the exterior of Headingley Castle is Victorian Gothic in style, the architect employed modern building techniques and materials including cast iron in its construction.

Leeds city centre has many examples from this era, such as Leeds Town Hall, the Leeds Kirkgate Market, the Hotel Metropole, the Leeds City Varieties, the Central Post Office, Calls Landings and the Corn Exchange to name a few.

Leeds Town Hall (pictured top) was designed by Cuthbert Brodrick and was opened by Queen Victoria in 1858. The Hotel Metropole was built in the 1890s and was inspired by French architecture of the time. The Leeds Corn Exchange was also designed by Cuthbert Brodrick and was built between 1861 and 1864. The building lay derelict for many years until 1985 when it was converted into a shopping centre. Harehills, Burley, Holbeck, Chapeltown, Woodhouse and East End Park contain many houses from this era, while Cross Gates has a 120-foot (37 m) column guided gasholder from this era.

The 19th century saw the construction of most of Leeds' railway infrastructure, including architecturally notable viaducts in Holbeck and Leeds city centre. None of the major railway stations from this era have survived, in fact most of Leeds railway station was rebuilt as recently as 2002.

As well as industrial architecture Hunslet has a history for some notable churches. The main steeple on Church Lane was once part of a large church. All but the steeple were demolished in the 1970s and a smaller church building attached. Meadow Lane in Hunslet was also home to Christ Church, an architecturally notable Gothic church, which has since been demolished.

Leeds Parish Church was constructed in 1841 and at 115 feet (35 m) tall it held the record as Leeds' tallest building until the building of the town hall in 1858.

=== Housing ===
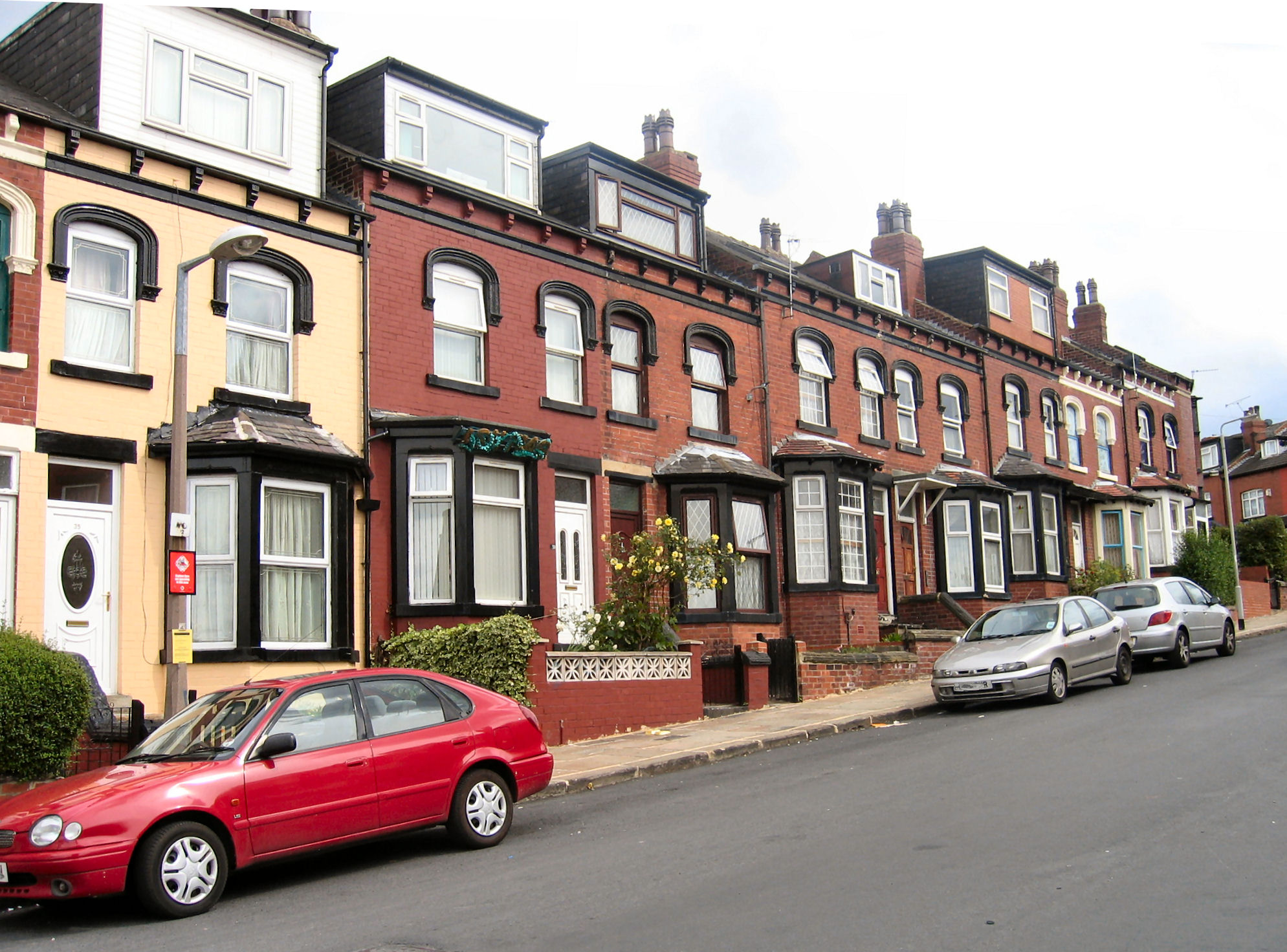
1800s through terraced houses in Harehills

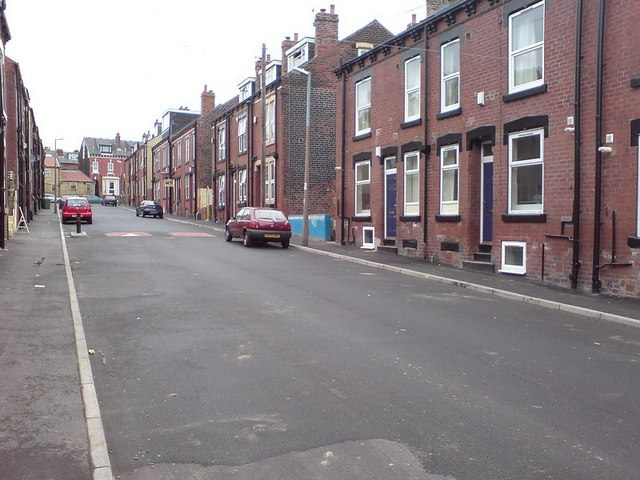
Back to back houses in Autumn Place, Burley

Leeds' growth in the 19th century led to mass migration to the city; this resulted in many areas of the city becoming overcrowded and many new houses being built. The industrial revolution led to the increase in both working and middle classes, leading to the building of many new houses, aimed at both classes. The most common form of housing to be built for the working classes was the 'back to back'. Back to back terrace houses were built in the largely working class districts of Harehills, Holbeck, Hunslet, Beeston and Armley, whilst larger through terrace houses were built for the middle classes in Headingley and Kirkstall. Chapeltown developed as an affluent district of Leeds, and boasts many large Victorian villas, however the popularity of outer suburbs such as Roundhay towards the late 20th century brought land values down in Chapeltown and the area fell into decline.

In 1830 the cost of building a small back to back house in Leeds was between seventy and eighty pounds. The average weekly rent was between two and four shillings, which was about a fifth of the average wages at the time.

== Twentieth century ==
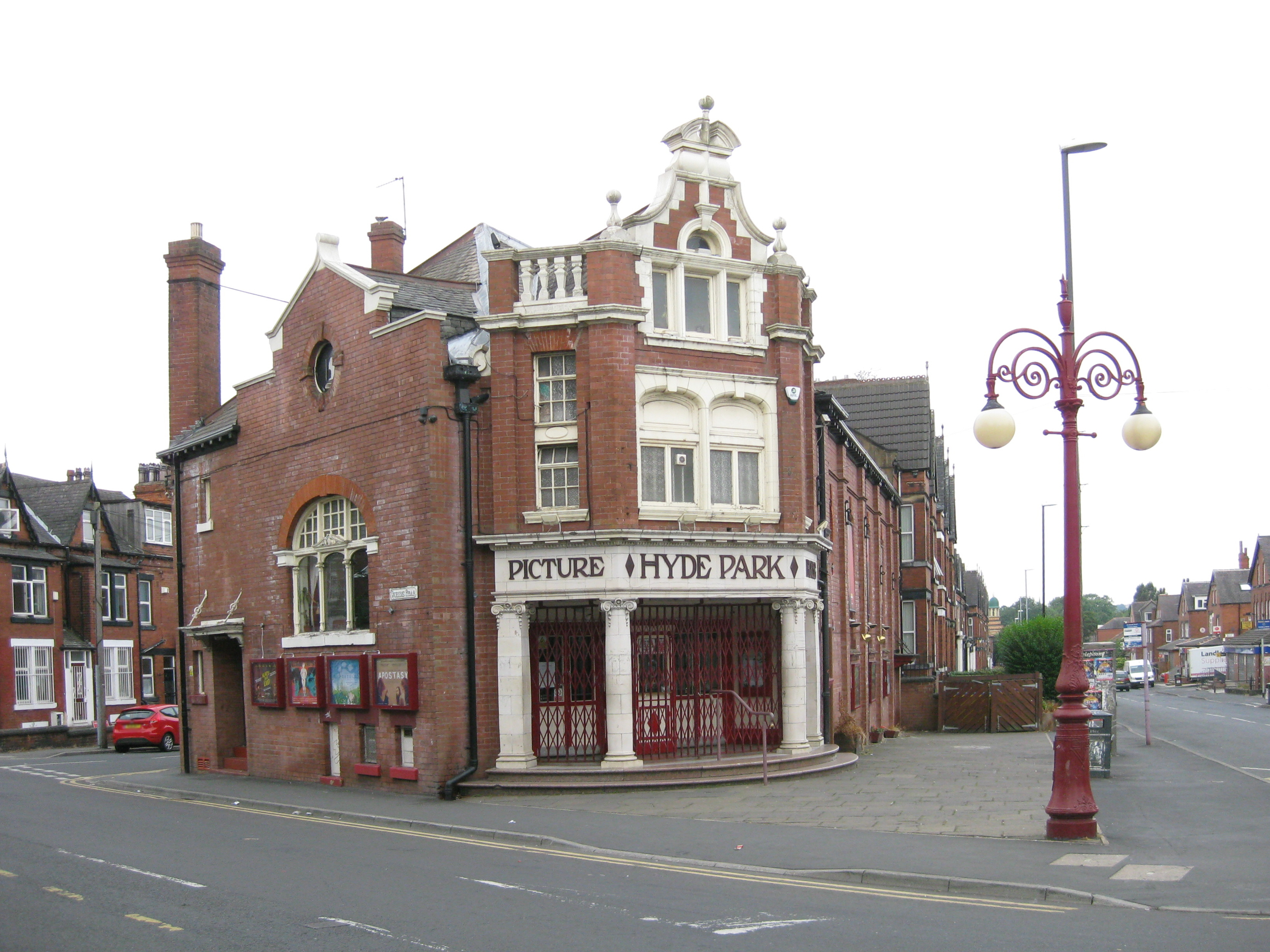
Hyde Park Picture House

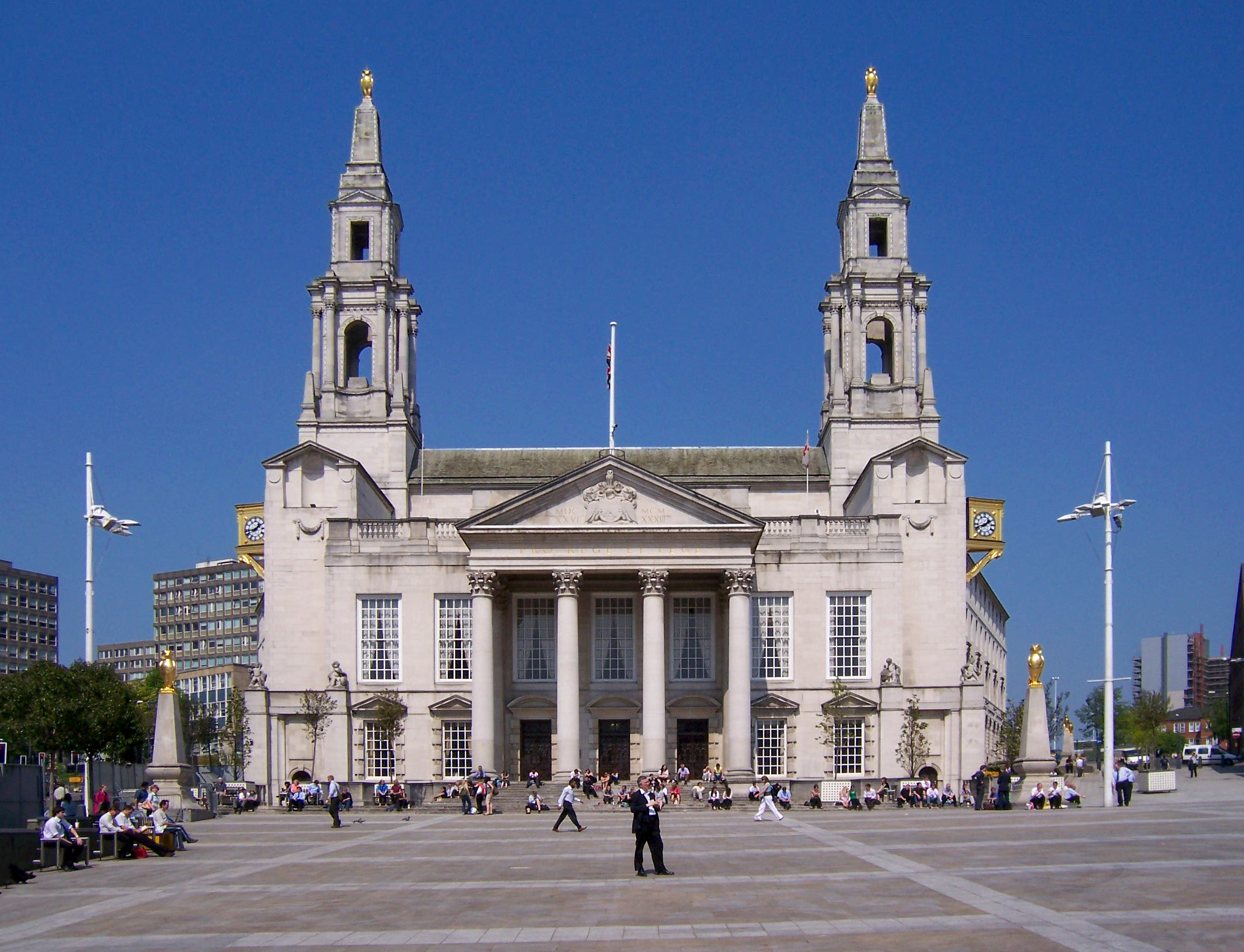
Leeds Civic Hall in Millennium Square

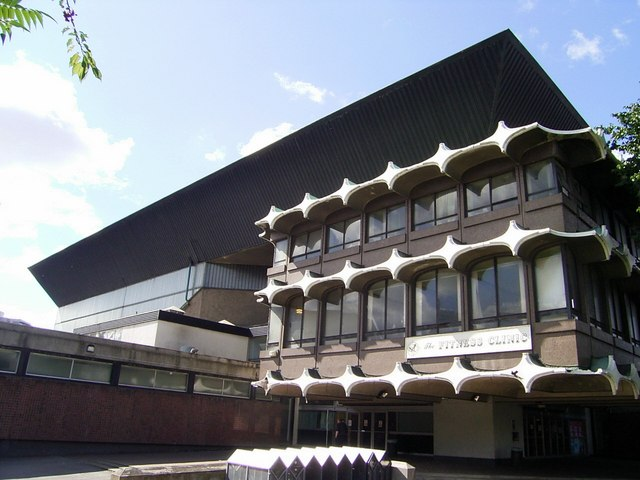
Poulson's Leeds International Swimming Pool, opened in 1966, demolished 2009

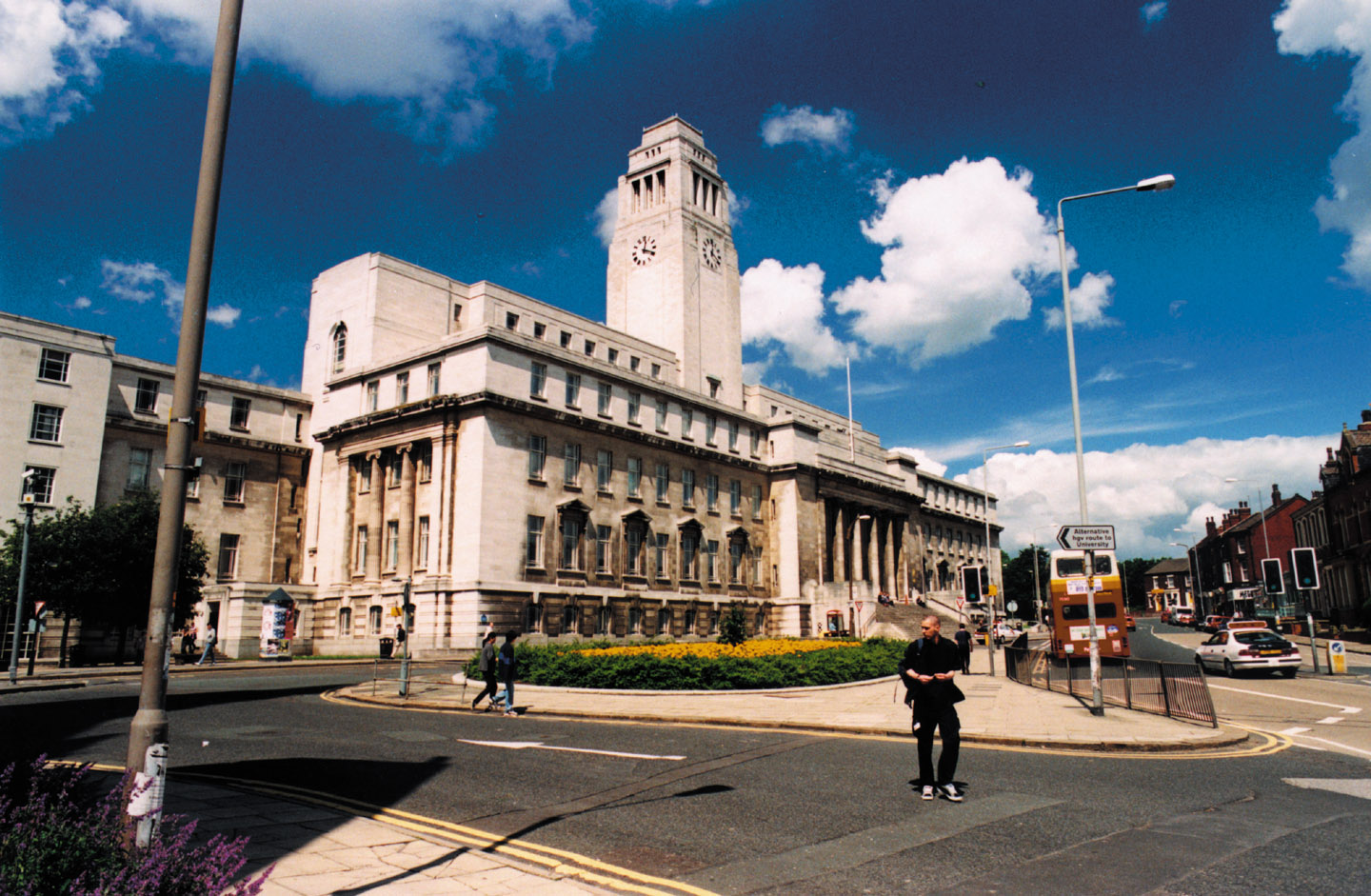
Parkinson Building at the University of Leeds

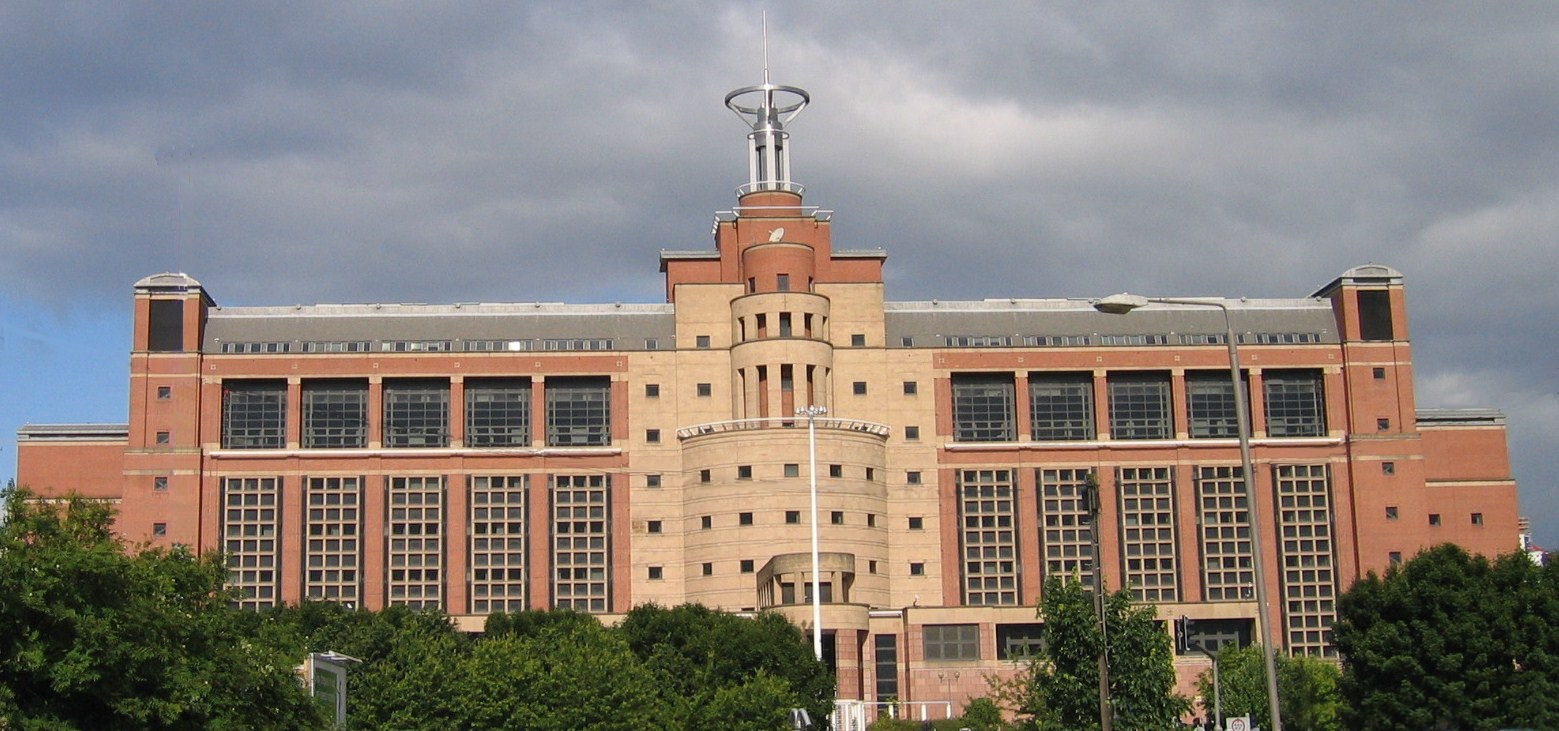
Quarry House, Quarry Hill, is often cited as an example of poor architecture, and is nicknamed 'The Kremlin' or 'The Ministry of Truth'.

Leeds has a wide variety of buildings from this era (And has remained unchanged). Chapel Allerton has many art deco semi detached houses from the 1930s while large parts of the city centre contain many commercial buildings from this era. Seacroft has many examples of 20th century residential architecture.

=== Early era ===
For the first decade of the 20th century many areas of Leeds saw a continuation of Victorian style architecture, particularly in areas like Beeston.

The Hyde Park Picture House, Hyde Park was originally built in 1908 as a hotel and in 1914 it was converted into a picture house. The cinema has gas lighting, the original organ and piano. It is a grade II listed building and one of the few surviving picture palaces in the UK. The picture house is regarded by many to be one of the finest examples of Edwardian architecture in Leeds.

=== 1920s to 1940s ===
Fashionable styles and materials in this era brought Portland stone buildings to Leeds. Major examples include Leeds Civic Hall, designed by E. Vincent Harris in 1930 and built between 1930 and 1933 to provide the unemployed with work during the Great Depression, the Queens Hotel on City Square (1937), the Brotherton Wing of Leeds General Infirmary (1940) and the Elinor Lupton Centre, Headingley (1934).

The Quarry Hill Estate was designed in 1933 but not completed until 1941 They were designed by Leeds Director of Housing R. A. H. Livett (1898–1959) and utilised a monolithic modernist design based on European examples, in particular the Karl Marx-Hof in Vienna. This was revolutionary at a time when most mass Council housing was based on a weak Neo-Georgian design. They were demolished throughout the 1970s and 80s after poor maintenance. It provided the backdrop for Yorkshire Television sitcom, Queenie's Castle.

The following year, Shaftesbury House, a large five-storey brick hostel for working men and woman opened. It was designed in 1936 by George Clark Robb, senior architectural assistant to Livett, and after its closure, was converted in 2006–7 to the sustainable Green House.

=== Art Deco ===
Chapel Allerton and to a lesser extent Headingley boast many Art Deco houses. Parts of the Leeds General Infirmary were built in Art Deco style. Chapel Allerton also boasted the former Dominion Cinema, which was built in Art Deco style, however this closed in the late 1960s and became a bingo hall, which was demolished in the 1990s. A Fish and chip shop in Oakwood retains its Art Deco front from the 1930s.

=== 1960s to 1980s ===
Many areas of Leeds such as Seacroft were almost entirely built in this era. There are many high-rise council flats in Leeds as well as office buildings such as West Riding House. Many Victorian slums were demolished during this era and replaced with council housing. There was also widespread private residential developments. Holt Park was a joint effort between the Leeds City Council and Norman Ashton. There were many Ashtons homes built during this time, particularly in Holt Park and Wetherby.

West Riding House was completed in 1973 and was the tallest building in Leeds until the completion of Bridgewater Place in 2007. In 2008 it was knocked into third position with the opening of Opal Tower.

The Inner Ring Road was constructed over the course of the 1960s. This was the most ambitious scheme of its kind in the UK with Leeds City Council subsequently promoting the city with the slogan Motorway City of the Seventies. The works involved the construction of many flyovers and tunnels and the Motorway construction is notable in itself.

Another council plan during the 1960s was to separate pedestrians and traffic, and it was proposed that any new buildings in City Square would be built with an overhead walkway – this never came to fruition, with only a short section ever being built.

The growth of the financial and business services sector from the mid-1980s onwards resulted in a boom in office developments in the city centre. Many of the buildings constructed at this time are in the style known as the "Leeds Look", which is typified by the use of dark red brickwork and steeply pitched grey slate roofs.

=== Brutalism ===
Leeds has limited examples of Brutalism, one such being the Leeds International Swimming Pool (designed by disgraced architect John Poulson). until the commencement of its demolition in Autumn 2009, following its closure in October 2007. The Leeds International Pool was not without its design flaws, the pool size was miscalculated and was less than an inch too narrow to qualify for Olympic Standard meaning that it never held the competitions the council had hoped for and it spent much of the 1960s closed while problems with its construction were rectified.

Parts of the Merrion Centre have brutalist undertones, particularly around the office blocks constructed as part of it and the former outdoor escalators to the rear.

Hunslet Grange Flats (more commonly known as the Leek Street Flats) displayed brutalism. They replaced run down back to back houses. It is unusual that Leek Street was chosen as their informal name as they replaced many other streets, including longer streets such as Alton Street. The flats were popular at first; however, they were so poorly designed and constructed that in 1983 they were demolished only thirteen years after being constructed. Smaller shops on the site had been demolished even earlier.

For a picture of the flats see the Leodis Database:(picture in 1975) and a (picture in 1973).

Often unseen parts of the University of Leeds display elements of brutalism, with large areas of exposed concrete. From the A660 however, only older parts of the university are visible. To view these parts of the university it is necessary to walk through the main campus.

=== 1990s ===
The 1990s saw further residential development, such as that around Colton. Schofields Department Store was demolished and replaced by the Schofield Centre (later the Headrow Centre and now The Core) and the White Rose Centre was constructed. The 1990s also saw Tesco redevelop Seacroft town centre, which had previously been architecturally notable for 1960s architecture.

Quarry House was constructed on the site of the former Quarry Hill Flats (see 1920s and 1930s) at Quarry Hill. The building houses the Department of Health and the Department for Work and Pensions and is their main regional offices. The building is controversial. Its imposing design has often been regarded as being domineering and self-important and has led the building to be nicknamed The Kremlin and The Ministry of Truth.

=== Housing ===
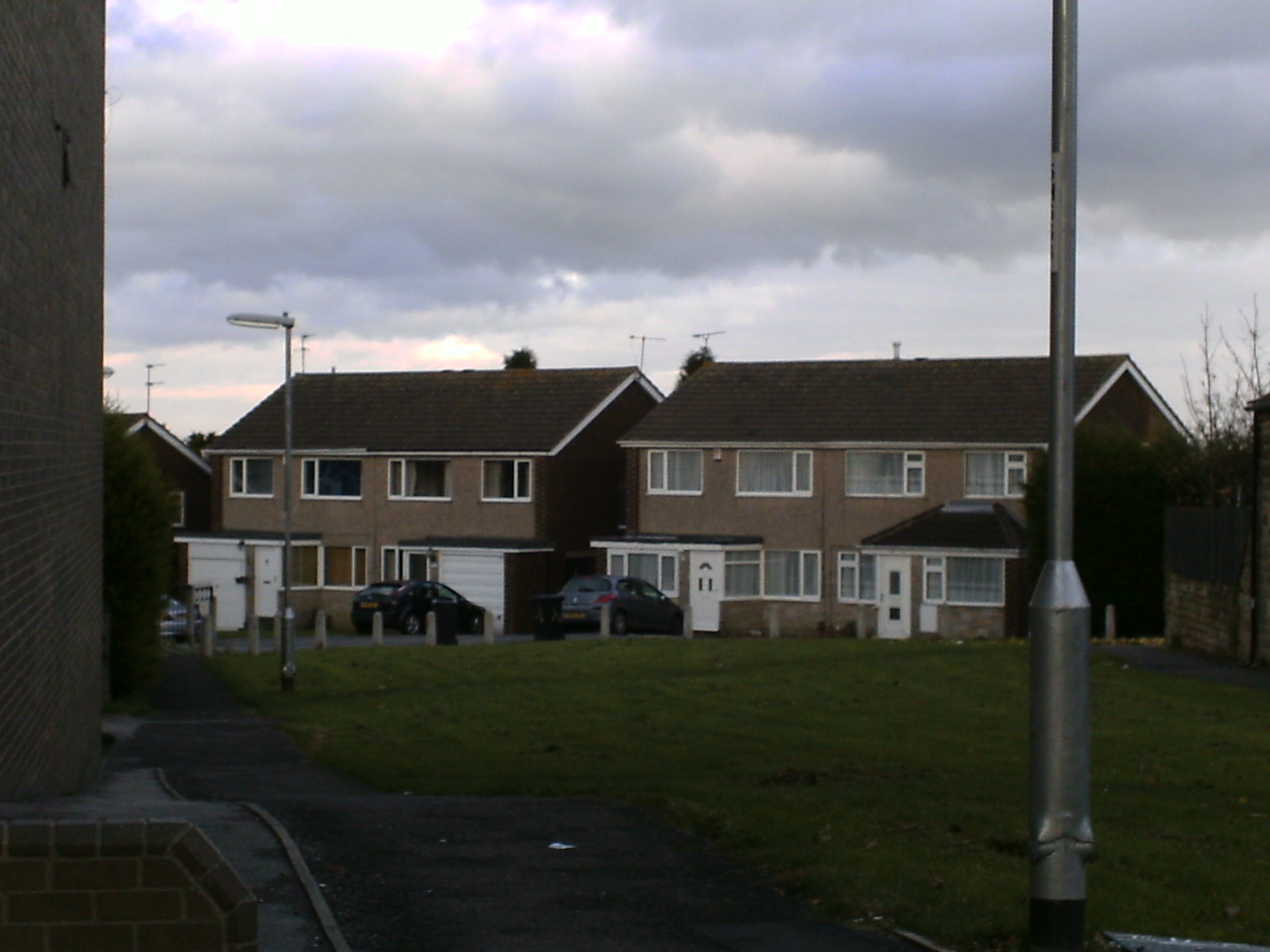
Private housing built by Ashtons in Holt Park

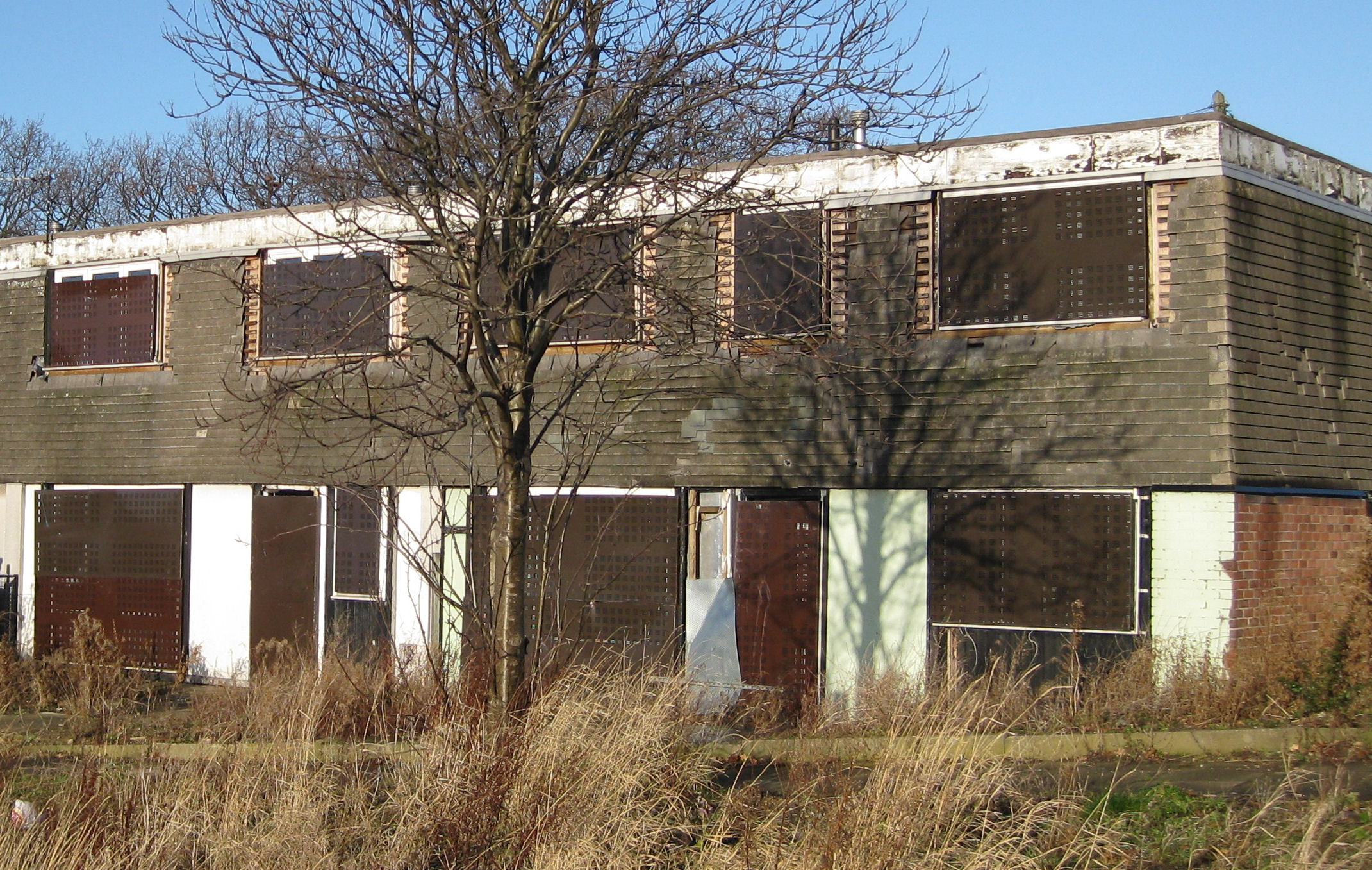
Boarded prefabricated housing in Seacroft

As in much of the UK, Leeds' housing stock had fallen into disrepair by the middle of the 20th century. The city was overcrowded, and the Victorian terraces were unsuitable for modern inhabitation. Leeds had one of the most Labour orientated councils and in the 1930s pledged to replace 30,000 slums. The older houses relied mainly on heating from open coal fires, which led to problems with smog (in 1962, 24 deaths in Leeds were attributed to this), although this problem was partially relieved in the 1950s with the introduction of the Clean Air Act 1956. Although a slum clearance scheme was under way in the 1930s, it took until after the Second World War, for the scheme to get well under way. In the 1950s, the largest social housing project began with the building of the Seacroft Estate. Seacroft was planned at the time to be a 'Satellite town within the city limits'. The building of new council estates was most prevalent in the city's east end and because of this the city expanded much further East in the latter part of the 20th century then it did any other direction. The Langbar Gardens Estate (completed 1966) in Swarcliffe lay right on the eastern fringes of the city sprawl until it was demolished in the early 21st century, including the high-profile implosions of Langbar Towers, Langbar Grange and Ash Tree Grange. By the 1960s and 1970s land for social housing was becoming scarcer and the council started looking towards building 'high rise', with such estates as Cottingley sporting prominent tower blocks. By the 1970s less land was available for such developments and the particularly large estates were becoming unpopular, however faced with a need for a larger social housing stock, Leeds City Council built smaller estates such as Holt Park (in partnership with Norman Ashton), replaced the prefabricated 'war houses' in Cottingley with newer prefabs and redeveloped areas such as Beckhill in Meanwood.

Perhaps the most obvious housing incarnation of this era has been the council house. These have been a subject of some controversy since they were built. On the one hand some people argue they vastly improved Britain's housing stock, and provided their occupants with modern luxuries such as central heating, an inside lavatory and a modern kitchen, while others criticise the way they were built, the disruption to communities, the build quality of certain batches of houses and the policy of housing problem tenants in them. Certain estates in Leeds have suffered from high crime and poverty (such as Seacroft, Gipton, Belle Isle and Halton Moor),

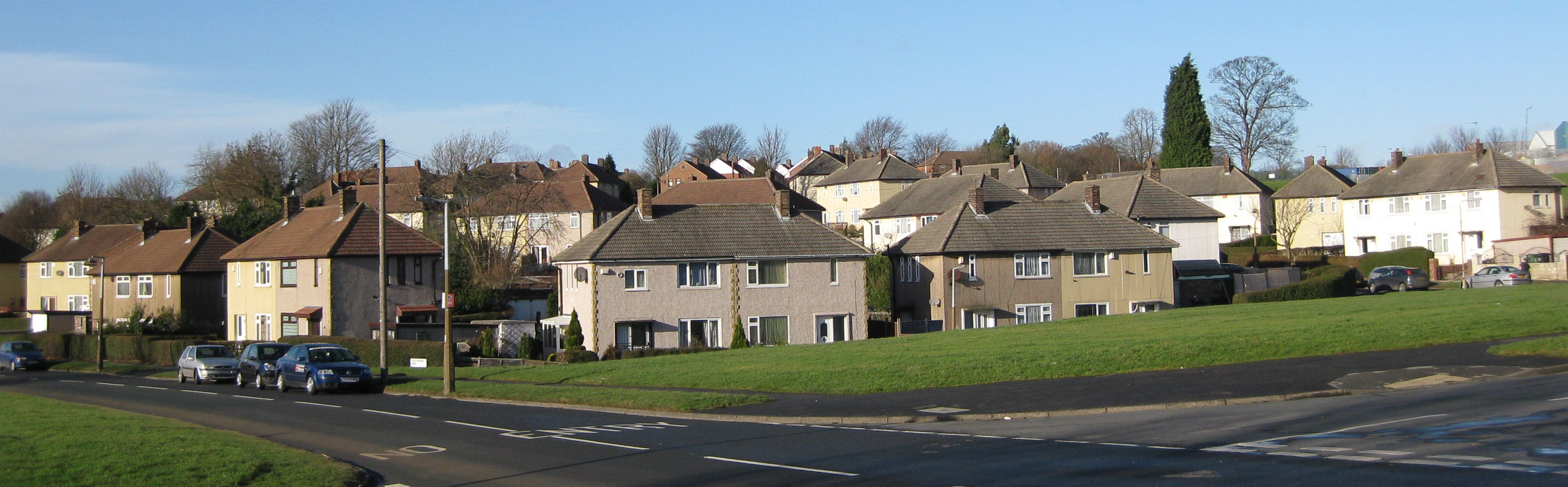
Concrete Council-built houses in Seacroft

== Twenty-first century ==
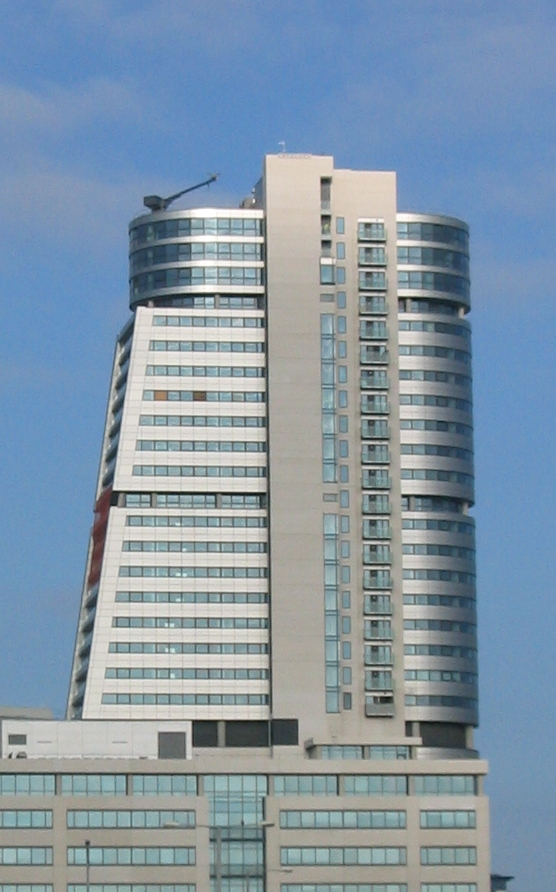
Bridgewater Place

So far during this period, Leeds has seen much development, particularly in the city centre, most notably the highrise developments such as Bridgewater Place, the developments around Clarence Dock, K2 (albeit a conversion from an older building) as well as many developments incorporating student accommodation. The 2002 redevelopment of Leeds railway station incorporated a notable steel and glass roof covering the main platform hall and providing panoramic views to the south west from the mezzanine level.

=== Bridgewater Place ===
Until Altus House was topped out in 2020, Bridgewater Place was the tallest building in Leeds and was the second tallest structure in Yorkshire after the Emley Moor Television Transmitter (near Huddersfield). The building comprises offices, flats, shops and restaurants. Bridgewater Place is 361 feet (110 m) tall and has 32 storeys. The original design included a spire, but this was never added. In 2008, Building Design, the architectural journal, shortlisted Bridgewater Place for the Carbuncle Cup, which is awarded to 'buildings so ugly they freeze the heart'.

=== Sky Plaza ===
The Sky Plaza is a skyscraper in the city centre. On completion in 2009, the Sky Plaza overtook Opal 3 as Leeds' second tallest building. The tower contains 572 student flats and stands at 338 feet (103 m). It has 37 storeys (making it the building with the most storeys in Leeds, as the Bridgewater Place has commercial height ceilings. These are particularly high for the first eight storeys).

=== Opal 3 ===
Opal 3 is a skyscraper in Leeds situated to the north of the city centre on Wade Lane, adjacent to the Merrion Centre and Tower House. The building was officially completed in September 2008 and at 269 feet (82 m) with 27 storeys Opal 3 is Leeds' third tallest building after Bridgewater Place and Sky Plaza. The building consists solely of student accommodation for the University of Leeds and Leeds Metropolitan University as well as Leeds' other further education institutions. The building was built on the former site of the Little Londoner (later The Londoner) public house, as well as some former car parking in the Lovell Park area of the city. Opal 3 was fully booked for the 2008 academic year. It contains 542 students flats (all which are en-suite) as well as a gym for student use.

=== Leeds Dock ===
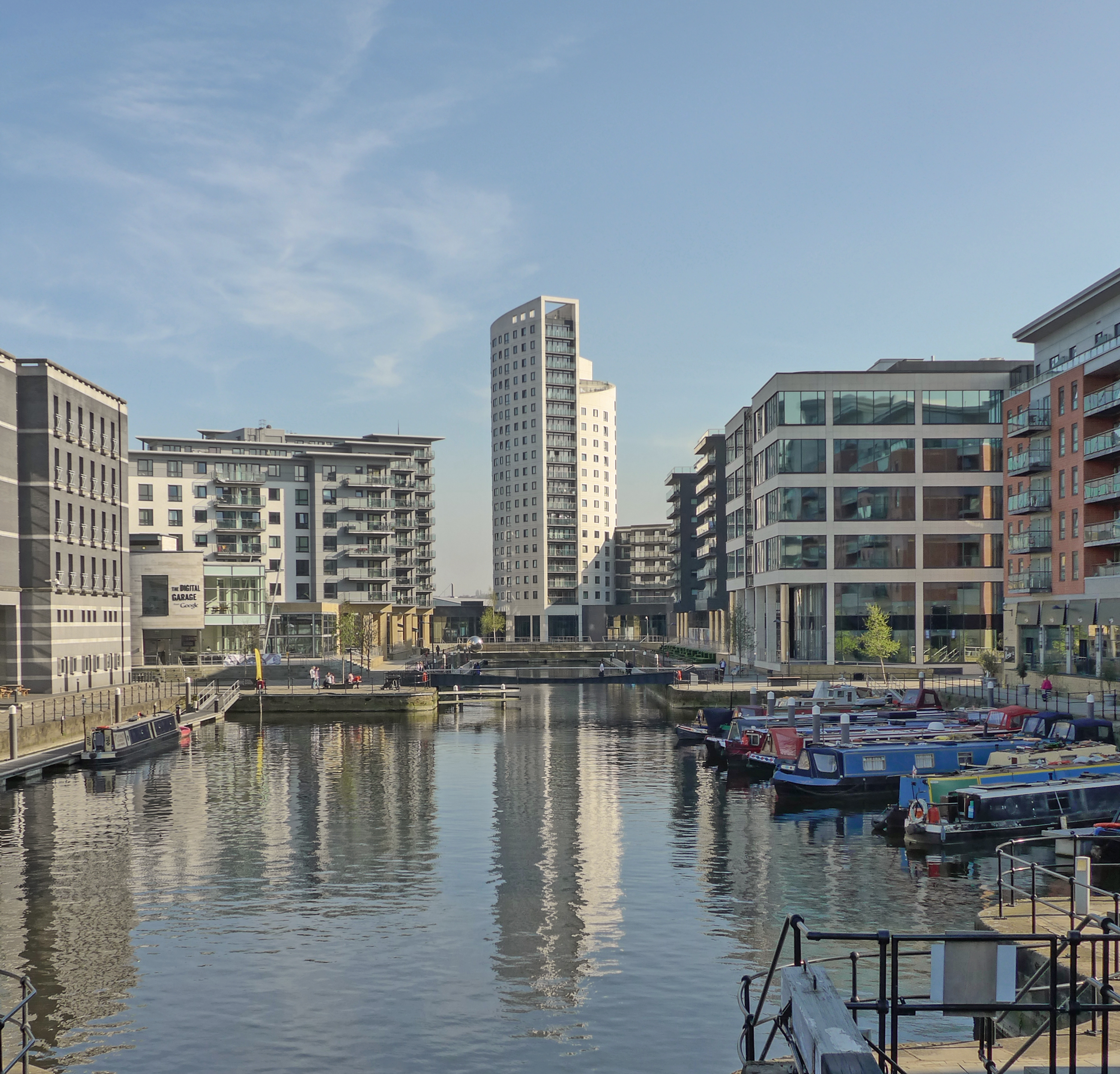
Leeds Dock, looking southeast

Leeds Dock was originally a large timber dock, situated between the city centre and Hunslet. Decades of industrial decline left the dock obsolete. The opening of the Royal Armouries Museum in 1996 began the regeneration of the area, however little else was undertaken, until the wider redevelopment began in 2001. This was completed in 2007 (at a cost of £260 million) and includes flats, offices, bars, restaurants, a hotel and a casino. The development centres on the dock itself as well as around 'Armouries Boulevard' and 'Armouries Square', two pedestrianised thoroughfares. The main office block on the development is Livingston House which has not yet attracted a tenant. The smaller dock incorporates six residential berths for house boats, while a passenger boat service to Granary Wharf runs from here.

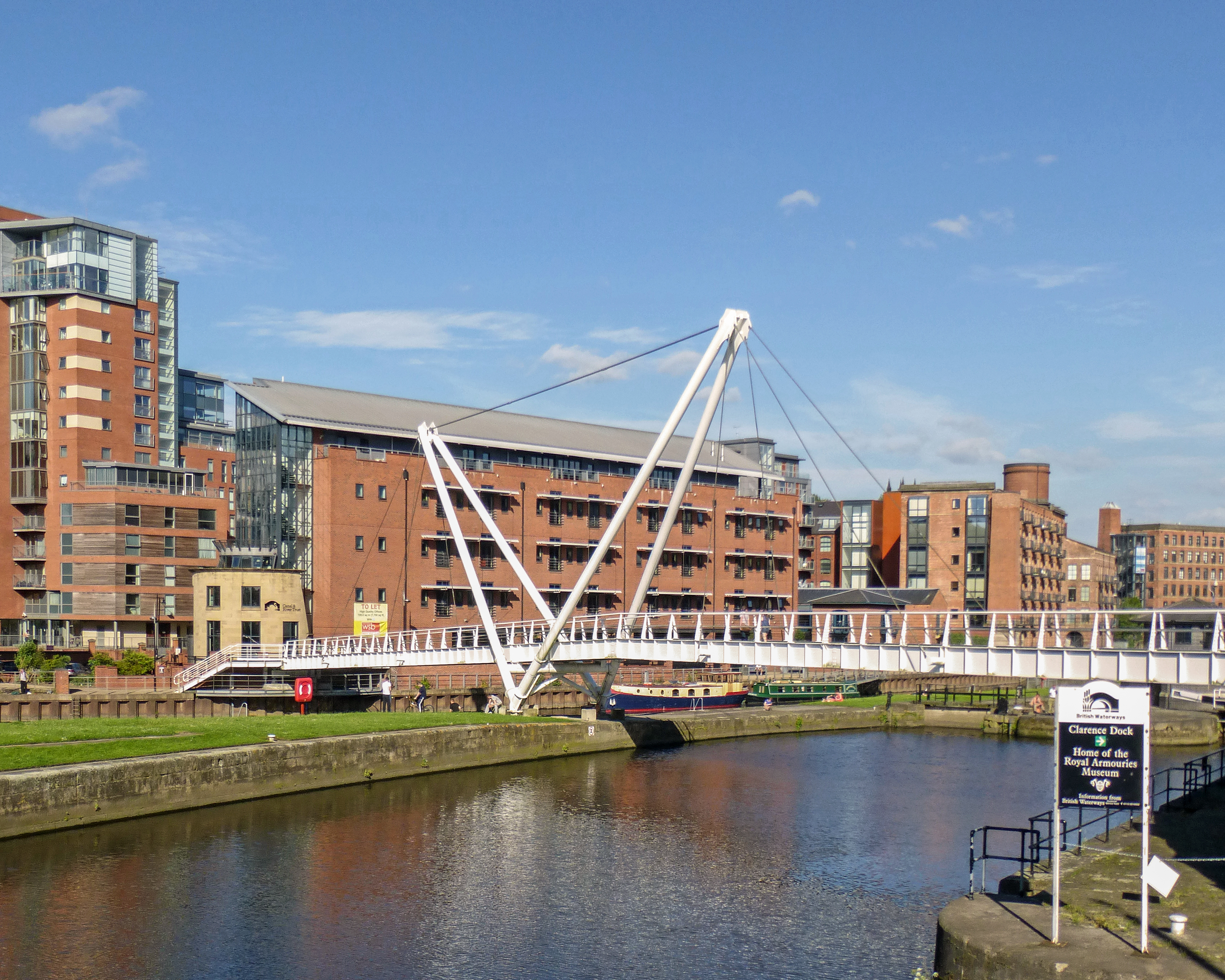
Knights Way Bridge at Leeds Dock over The River Aire, linking Leeds Dock with the East Bank

The development has not been without criticism, with many people in the city commenting on the lack of people in the area, while architect Maxwell Hutchinson described them as the "slums of the future". and described the development as a "mundane collection" of buildings and an "incredibly soulless place" and claimed that "in two or three decades these shiny new buildings will be following Quarry Hill down the spiral of decay". These claims were explored on the BBC television programme Inside Out. While at a fashion show at Leeds Dock, Gok Wan claimed he thought the development would be a huge success.

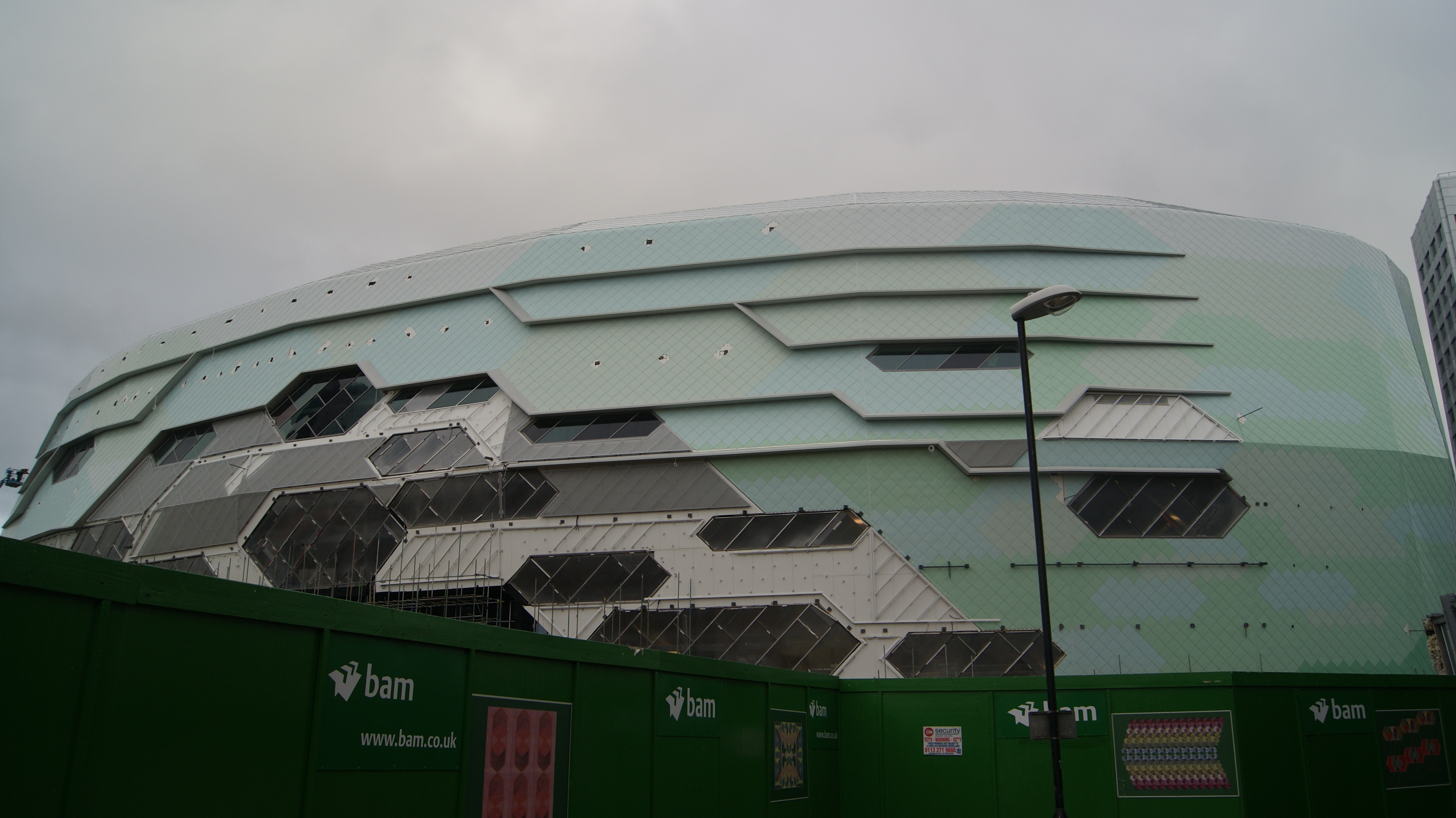
Leeds Arena under construction in December 2012

=== Leeds Arena ===
Leeds Arena is a 13,500 seat 'super-theatre' style venue, the first in the UK to be built in a 'fan' orientation. Construction began in 2011 after decades of calls for a venue to replace the Queens Hall, which was demolished in 1989 and represented the city's only large concert hall. In the intervening period Leeds was the only major city in the UK without such a venue.

The building itself is based around a striking honeycomb frontage, modelled on close-up images of an insect's eye, and is illuminated at night in a variety of colours that reflect the mood of whichever show is playing at the time.

== Future ==
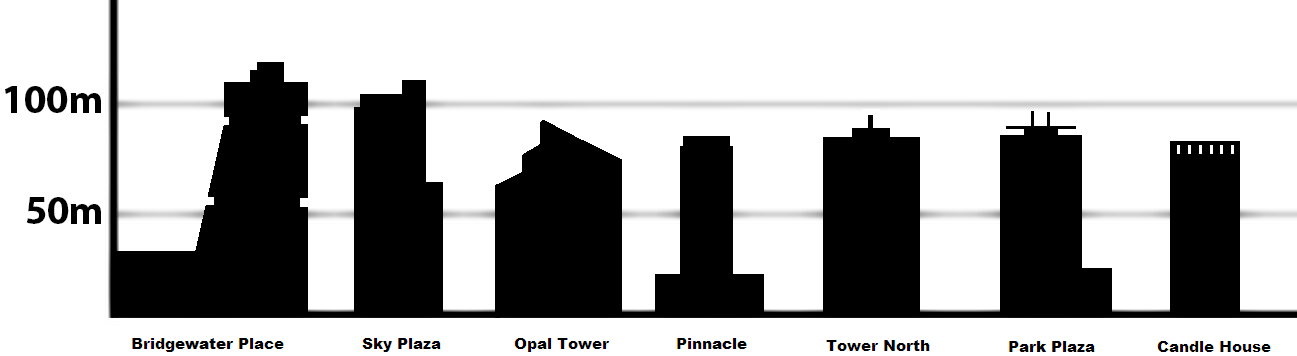
Comparative height of the tallest buildings in Leeds

Two major developments in Leeds city centre were planned for completion around the beginning of the new decade, but were put on hold due to the prevailing economic conditions and subsequently cancelled. These buildings were Criterion Place and Lumiere, both of which would have been the tallest residential buildings in the UK at the time of their completion.

A number of investments and proposed activities are aimed at regenerating 253 hectares of land that lies south of the River Aire in Leeds. The regeneration of this area of Leeds, referred to as the South Bank, will be the biggest change the city has seen in more than a hundred years. It currently houses old warehouses and abandoned buildings.

Among the projects are plans for Leeds' tallest building. Commercial Estates Group (CEG) are leading a project on patches of land around Globe Road and Water Lane, Holbeck, including a 40-storey, 142-metre-tall (466 ft) structure.

== Critical reception on Leeds' architecture ==
In 1968 John Betjeman made a television film called A Poet Goes North, in which he gave his opinion on the changing architecture of Leeds. Betjeman described the constant sound of falling Victorian architecture. Betjeman also lambasted British Railways House (now City House) saying it blocked all the light out to City Square and was only a testament to money and had no architectural merit of its own. Betjeman also praised Leeds Town Hall in the film. The film, which was never broadcast at the time, was preserved by Leeds Civic Trust and has been restored by the Yorkshire Film Archive. It was screened as part of the Leeds International Film Festival in 2008.

Architect and critic Maxwell Hutchinson has attracted controversy in his criticism of recent architectural developments in Leeds, most notably Clarence Dock. In referring to Leeds' plans for the future, Hutchinson said "there are worrying signs that Yorkshire is about to make the same mistakes that we have made in London over 20 years ago". Hutchinson also criticised the dearth of services in the city centre, referring to its lack of schools and health-care facilities. Hutchinson also described the Clarence Dock development as "the slums of the future". These claims were explored on the BBC television programme, Inside Out. Hutchinson claimed that Leeds needed an iconic building like Manchester's The Lowry or Gateshead's The Sage. However he claimed that the redevelopment of older buildings around The Calls "could compete with anywhere in Europe for the quality and sensitivity of its design."

The Guardian architecture critic Owen Hatherley lamented post-millennium architecture in Leeds and bemoaned the weak planning system for allowing a wave of "astoundingly cheap-looking architecture" in the city. Hatherley points to Sky Plaza as a prime example.

== Public space ==
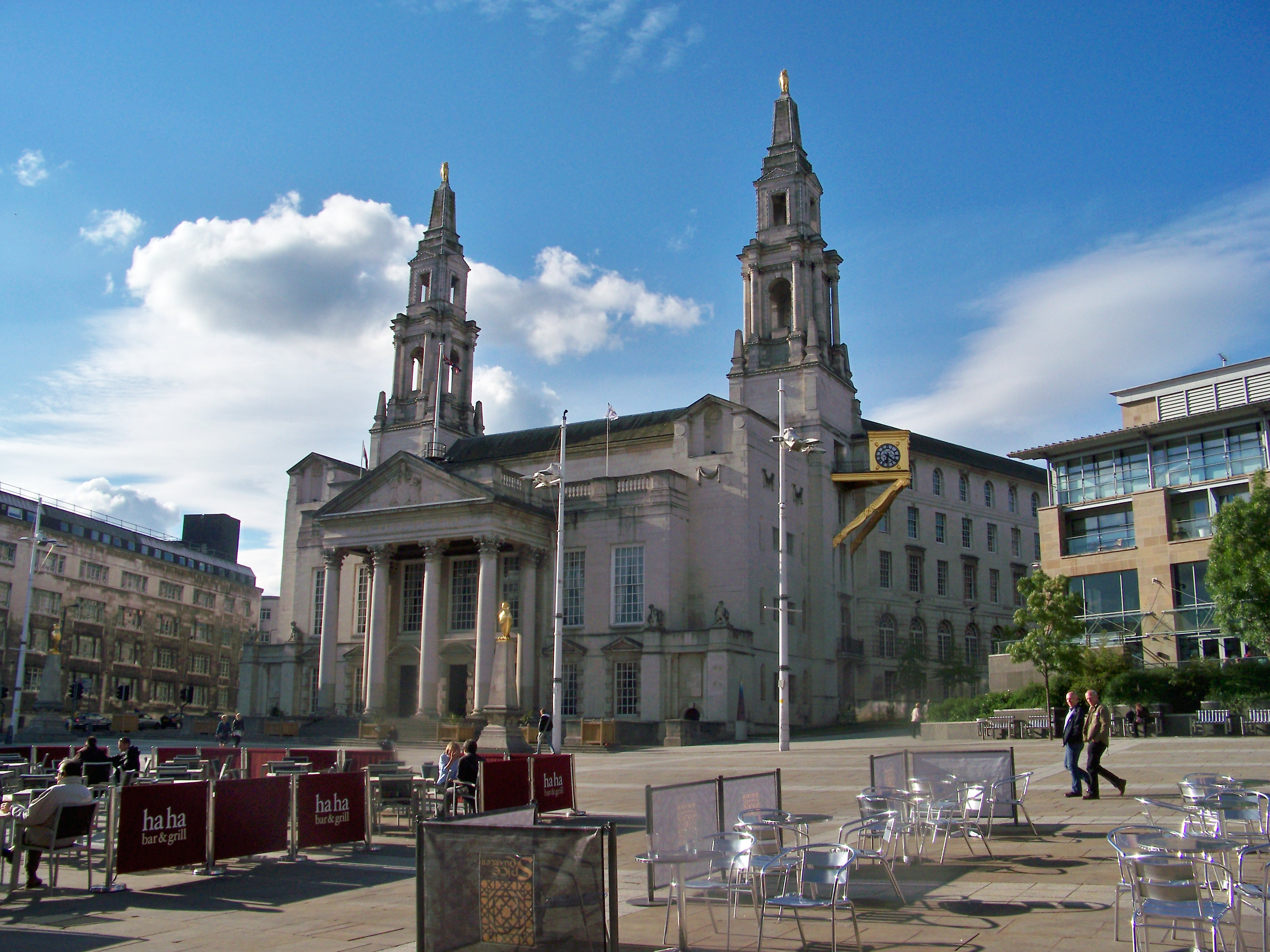
Millennium Square

Leeds city centre has four main public squares being Park Square, City Square, Armouries Square and Millennium Square.

Smaller squares do exist, including Dortmund Square, St Peters Square, Queen Square, Woodhouse Square and Hanover Square. In recent years there have been a number of concerted efforts to add to the public space within the city centre, including the development of Sovereign Square, Granary Wharf, and Bond Court, as well as ambitious plans for a large city centre park on the South Bank. Since 2000, both City Square and Millennium Square have been redeveloped with hard landscaping. In an interview with Martin Wainwright, the northern editor of The Guardian, architect Irena Bauman, praised City Square for being a well designed and well used public space, however she criticised The Plaza Tower (Leeds, England) development for its lack of public space, stating that the only space made available was for service vehicles.

In 2018 Leeds City Council launched its new strategy for improving public spaces in the city centre. This incorporates a number of key projects for development or redesign of new public space, and included a strong consultative element.

== Awards ==
Many buildings in Leeds have been shortlisted for or won architecture awards.

=== Council for Tall Buildings and Urban Habitat (CTBUH) ===
Broadcasting Tower, Woodhouse Lane, was voted the best tall building in Europe in June 2010 by the Council on Tall Buildings and Urban Habitat, and went on to be voted the best tall building in the world in October 2010, fending off competition from the Burj Khalifa.

=== RIBA ===
The following buildings have a RIBA award:

- The Corn Exchange
- The Henry Moore Institute

Granary Wharf – Waterman's Place, Mint Hotel and Candle House

=== The People's Award ===
The short listed buildings for the People's Award of the Leeds Architecture Awards in 2003 were:

- The School of Music, Cavendish Road, Leeds city centre
- House Extension, 31 Westgate, Wetherby
- The BT Headquarters, Neville Street, Leeds city centre
- Ask, formerly the Rendezvous Café, Market Place, Wetherby
- The Chapel, Martin House, Boston Spa
- K2 Development, Albion Street, Leeds city centre
- Foxwood Flats, West Avenue, Roundhay
- Mixed Development, 1 Dock Street, Leeds city centre
- BBC Headquarters, Quarry Hill

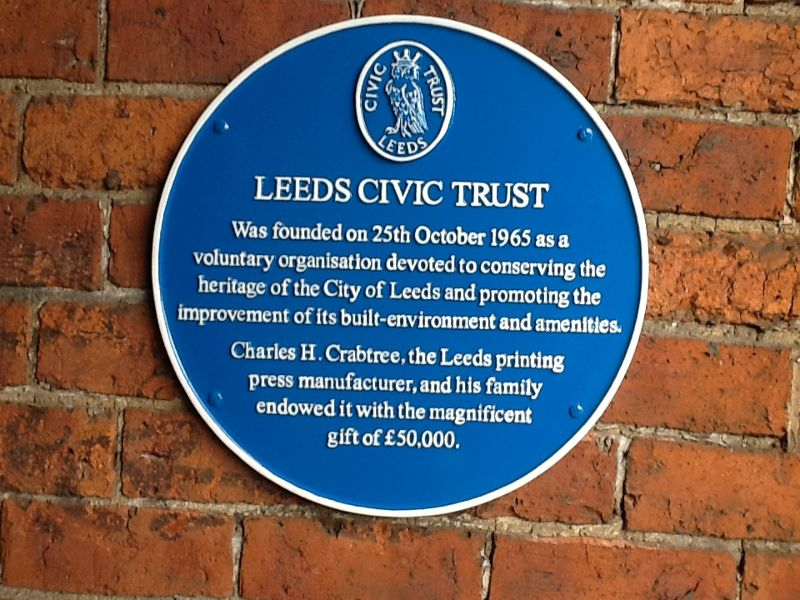
Leeds Civic Trust Blue Plaque

== Leeds Civic Trust ==
Leeds Civic Trust is a voluntary, non-profit body whose aims and objectives are to:

- Stimulate interest in and care for the history and character of the city.
- Encourage high standards of design, architecture and town planning.
- Encourage the improvement of features of public amenity.
- Promote co-operation in the achievement of these objectives.

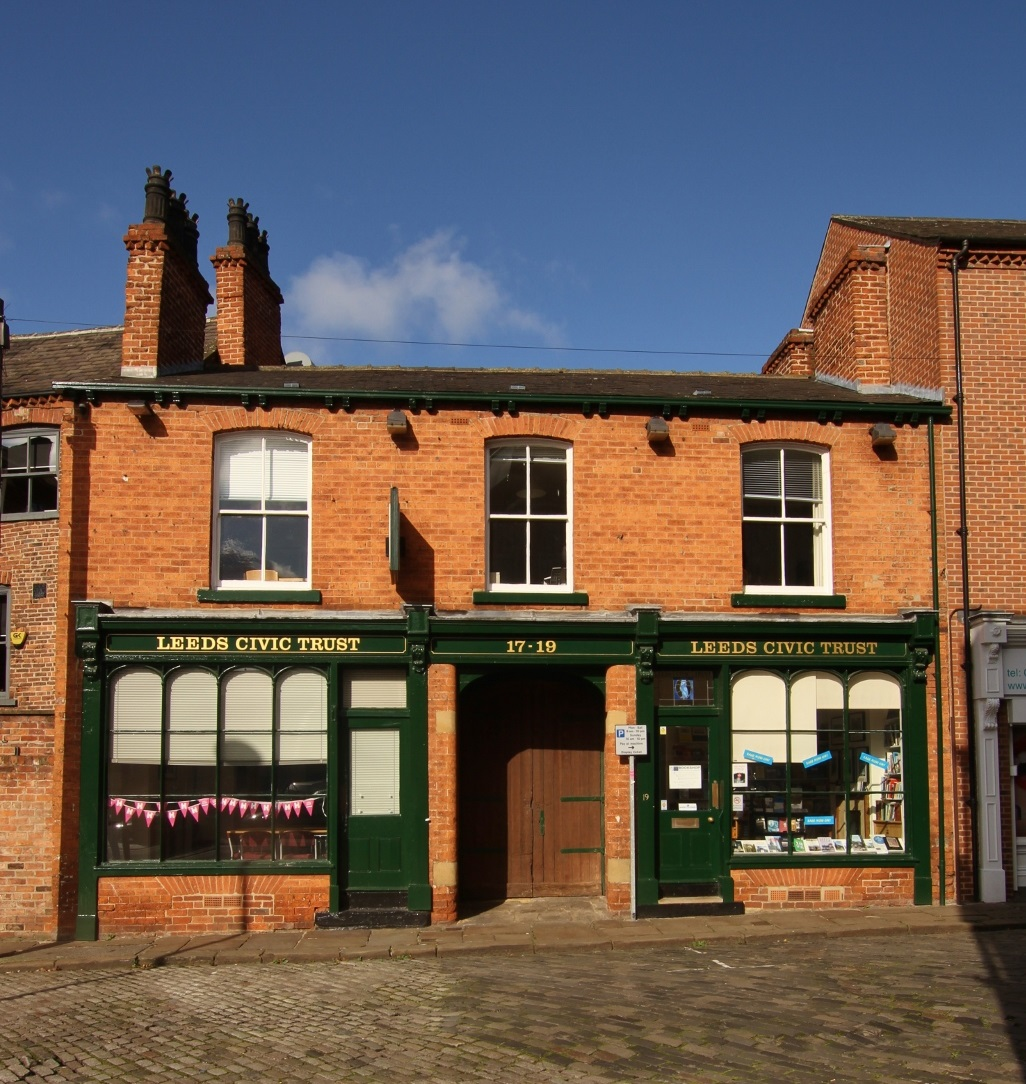
17–19 Wharf Street: the shop and offices of Leeds Civic Trust

The Trust works to preserve Leeds' architectural heritage and to ensure that new developments are of suitable quality for the city. It also organises the local Heritage Open Days in conjunction with the Civic Trust.

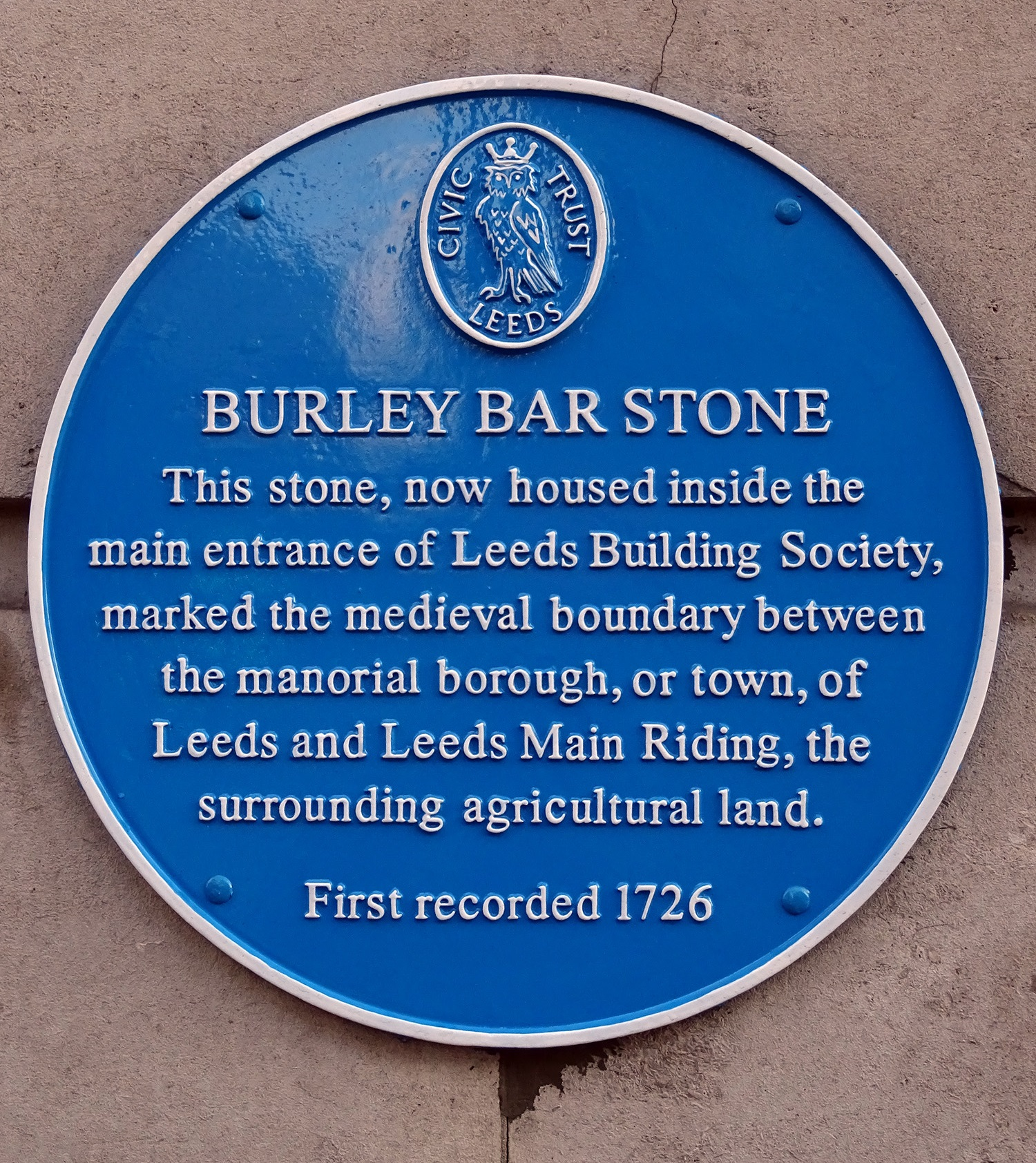
The first blue plaque

=== Blue Plaque Scheme ===
In 1987 the Trust started putting up Blue plaques to honour notable buildings, objects and people in Leeds. The first was the Burley Bar Stone plaque marking one of the medieval gates of Leeds, the stone itself surviving within the building of the Leeds Building Society on Albion Street. The West Bar and East Bar were also marked, and in 2017 the 164th plaque marked the North Bar.

=== Rainbow Plaques ===
In association with the 2018 Leeds Pride event, the Trust announced that it would be creating a trail of Rainbow Plaques to commemorate those who have contributed to the LGBT+ story of Leeds. A map has been published showing the location of 15 plaques.

== See also ==
- Leeds
- History of Leeds
- List of tallest buildings in Leeds
- Listed buildings in Leeds
- Category:Listed buildings in Leeds
- List of Grade I listed buildings in Leeds
- Brudenell School Leeds
- List of council high-rise apartment buildings in the City of Leeds
