= Leeds Society for Deaf and Blind People =

English charity

Leeds Society for Deaf and Blind People is a charity based in Leeds, West Yorkshire, England, that provides practical services to deaf, hard of hearing, deafblind, blind and partially sighted people in the region. The charity has existed since 1866 and is one of the only charities of its kind in the country to provide services to those with both a hearing and/or visual impairment.

== Work ==
The Society provides a broad range of services to those with a sensory impairment in the West Yorkshire region. These include a Sign Language Interpreting Service, equipment provision, social workers for profoundly deaf people, services for deafblind people, training courses and qualifications including a Taster Course, Levels 1–3 in British Sign Language, and Sensory Awareness.

The Society has worked in partnership with Leeds City Council since the 1950s, and currently acts as an arms-length service provider for a number of services. The Society also relies on voluntary donations and fundraising to deliver a number of services to the community. It fundraises through events including corporate golf days, sporting dinners and wine tasting evenings, although also relies heavily on the generosity of individuals and charitable trusts alike.

Leeds Society for Deaf and Blind People remains focused at all times on achieving better outcomes for vulnerable people and contributing to improving the wellbeing of all citizens of Leeds, by responding to need wherever possible and developing partnerships whenever they present themselves in every area of their work.

== History ==
In 1866, the Vicar of Leeds, Revd D. R. Atley, convened a public meeting to form Leeds United Institution for the Blind and the Deaf and Dumb (later renamed Leeds Incorporated Institution for the Blind and the Deaf and Dumb). A public appeal was launched in 1873 by the Mayor of Leeds, Mr H. R. Marsden, for funds for premises which led to the Albion Street premises being opened in 1876. The new building incorporated workshops for blind people, a service chapel for deaf people and areas for socialising. It was located at the site of corner of Albion Street (westside) and St Anne's Street (northside). The site was demolished in the early 1970s and has since undergone redevelopment and conversion to the present K2 building.

In 1917 the organisation became a registered charity and its Memorandum and Articles of Association were approved. In 1976, following the purchase of the former Leeds Public Dispensary, Centenary House was officially opened by Prince Philip, Duke of Edinburgh on 13 February.

More recently, in 1996 the name of the Society changed to Leeds Society for Deaf and Blind People. In 2004 Shire View Resource Centre for Visually Impaired People was welcomed under the banner of the Society. In 2008, Leeds Society for Deaf and Blind People took over the management of the city’s only braille and large print unit from Leeds City Council.
