= Granary Buildings, Leeds =

Granary Buildings
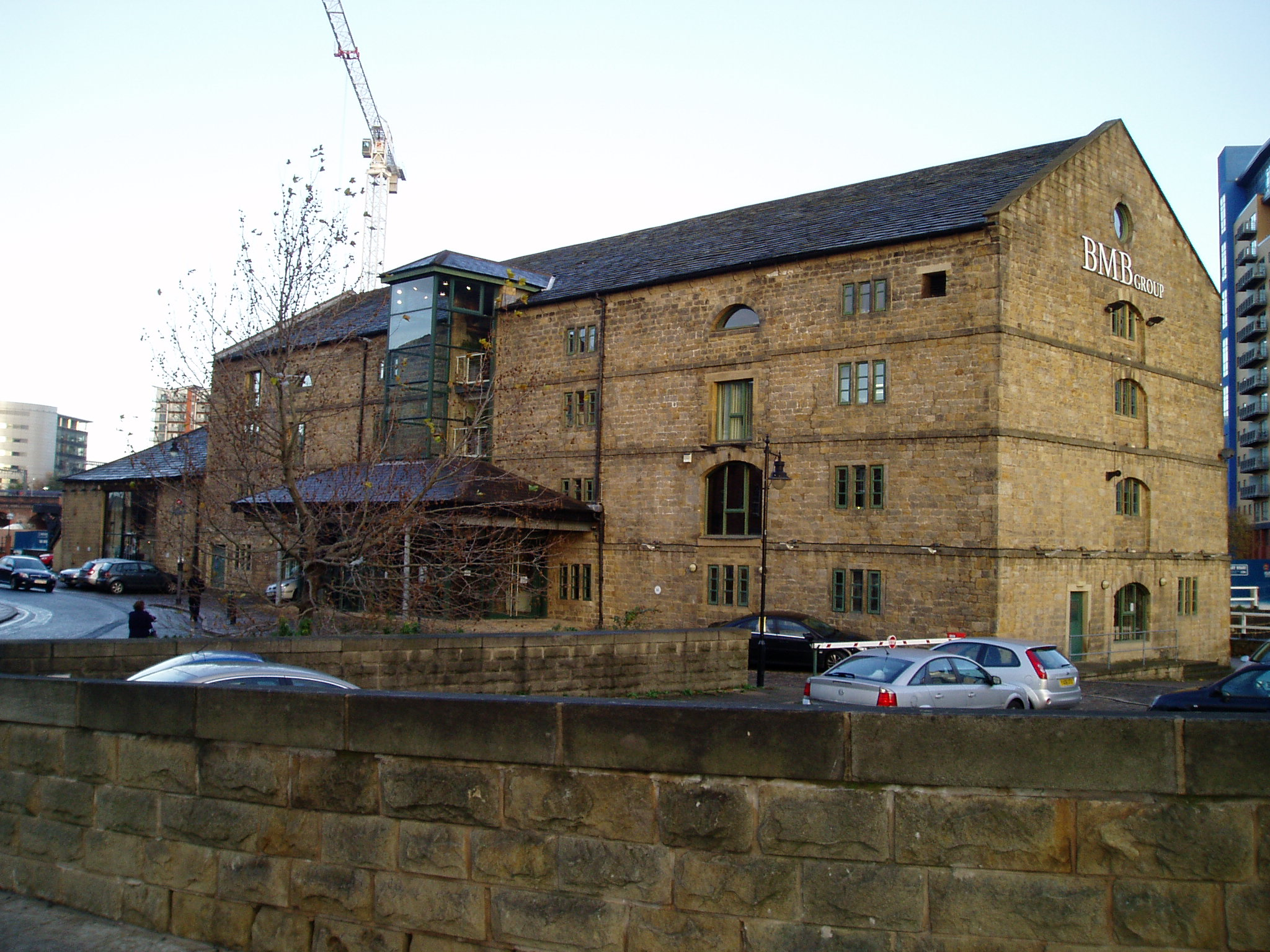
- Interactive map of Granary Buildings
- Location: Canal Wharf, Leeds, West Yorkshire, England
- Coordinates: 53.79278°N 1.54861°W
- Built: 1776
- Built for: Leeds & Liverpool Canal Company

Listed Building – Grade II*
- Official name: Former Leeds and Liverpool Canal Company warehouse
- Designated: 5 August 1976
- Reference no.: 1255696

Granary Buildings is a heritage listed building in Leeds, West Yorkshire, England.

== History ==
Built in around 1776 as a warehouse for the Leeds & Liverpool Canal Company, the Granary Building is a Grade II* listed building. It stands by Lock No.1 (the ”River Lock”) of the canal.

It is regarded as “an important survival from the extensive range of buildings at the end of the Leeds and Liverpool Canal at its junction with the River Aire and close to the boundary of the Aire and Calder Navigation.

The building was designed by Robert Owen, engineer for the canal company, and was unusual in that a branch of the canal ran into the building allowing loading of barges under cover.

Significant remodelling took place in the mid to late 19th century including the addition of the single-storey extension to the west. Internal timber floors were replaced with cast-iron columns and fire-proof brick arches to reduce the risk of fire.

Conversion to its current use was undertaken in the mid-1990s including the insertion of additional windows and raising the height of the top storey to satisfy current standards for ceiling heights, work undertaken by the engineering firm Abbey Pynford. The main building served as the headquarters for Baird Group Ltd, a menswear company, until May 2021 and the later extension is Water Lane Boat House, a bar.

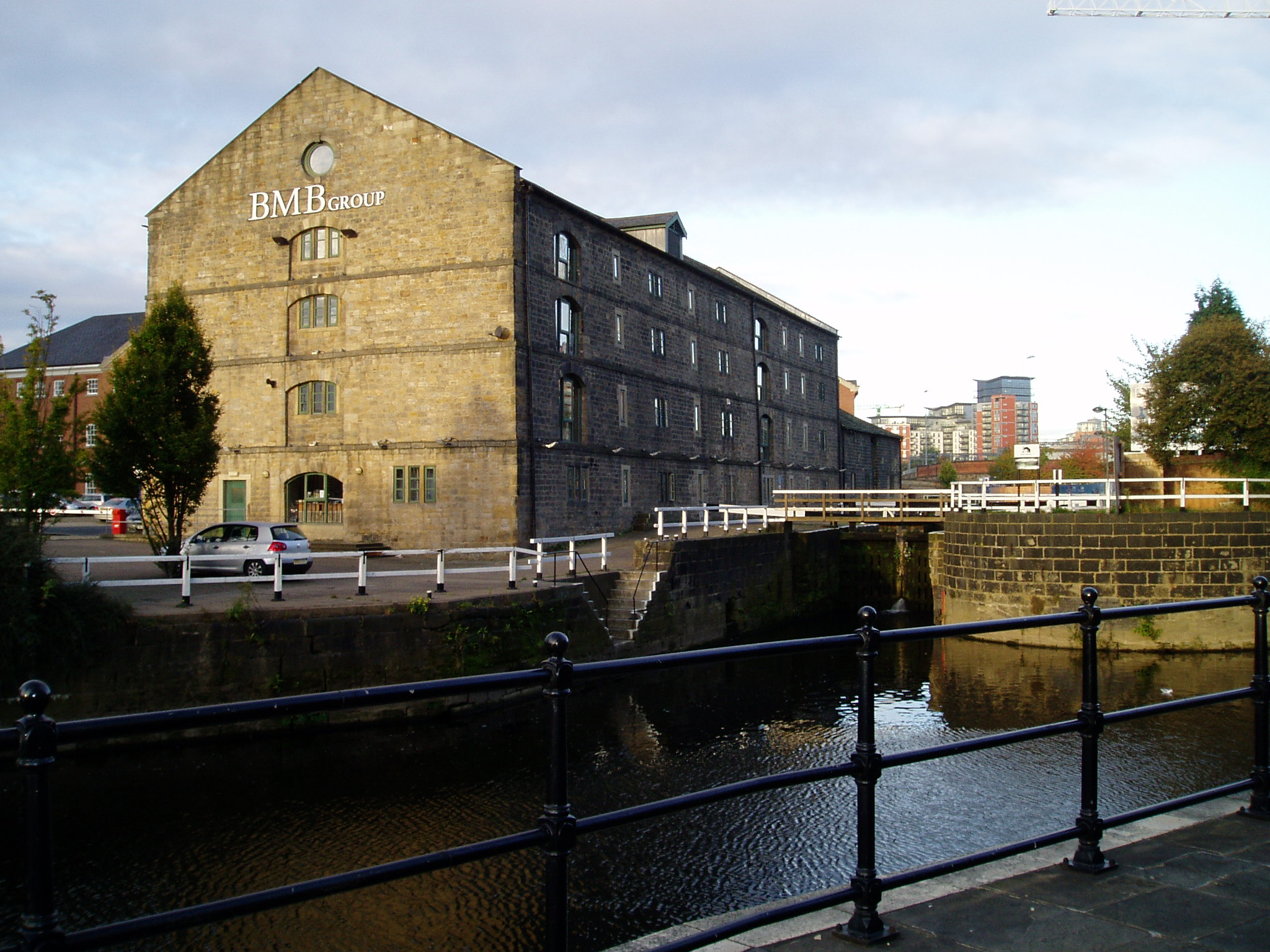
Granary Building and Lock No.1

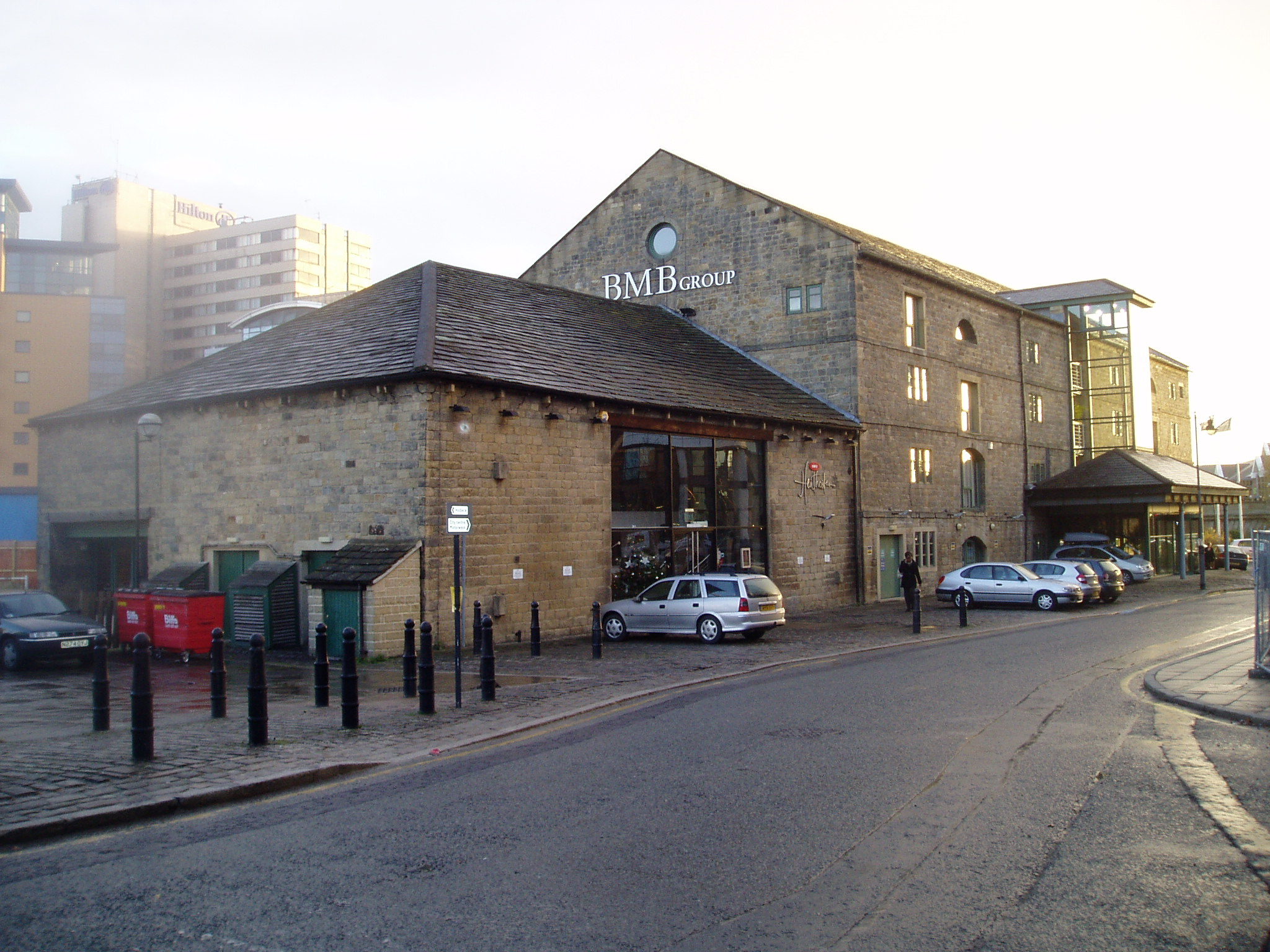
19th Century extension

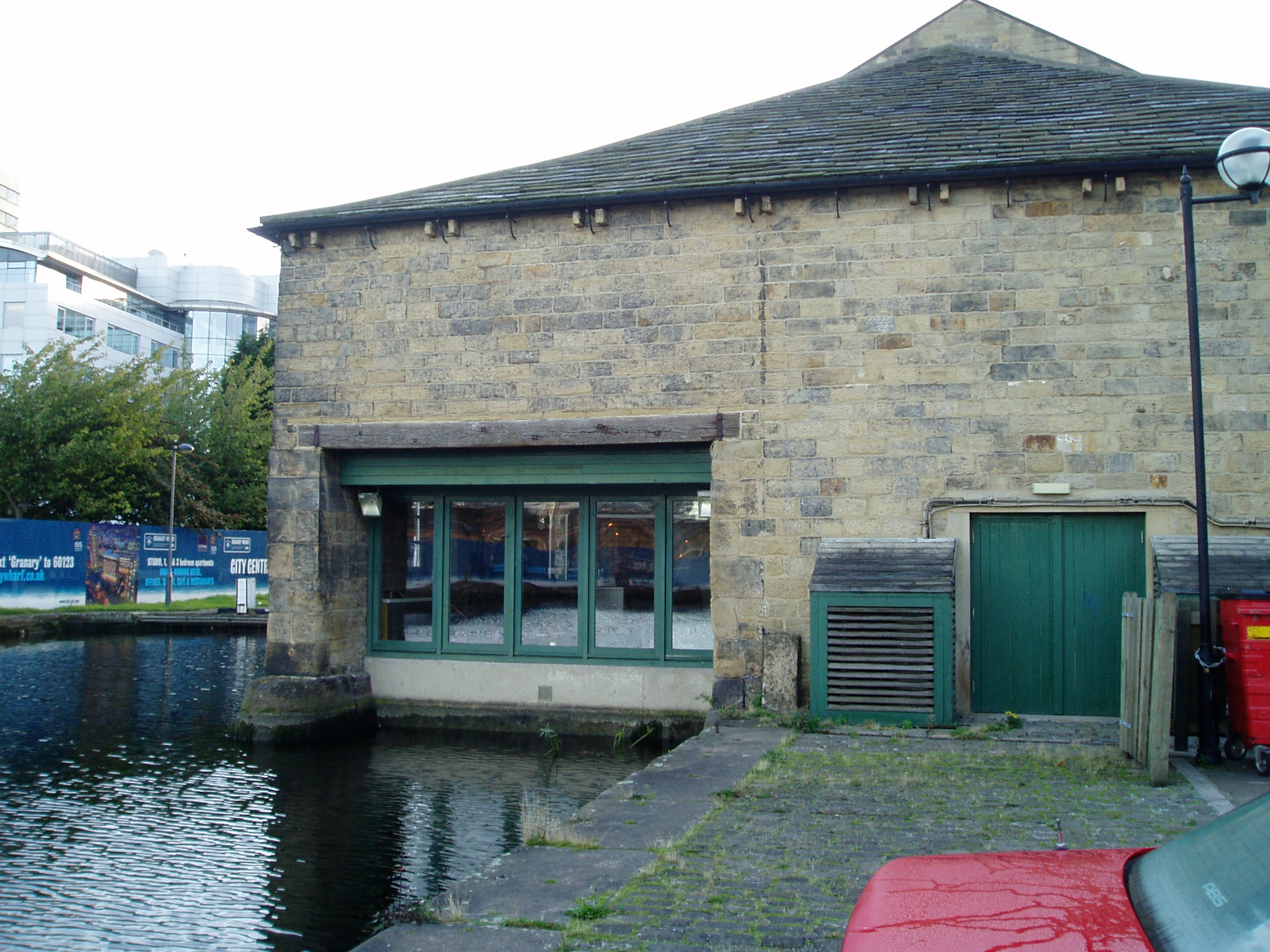
Former canal entrance

== See also ==
- Architecture of Leeds
- Leeds and Liverpool Canal
