= Brudenell School =

School in Leeds, England

Coordinates: 53.81338°N 1.57202°W

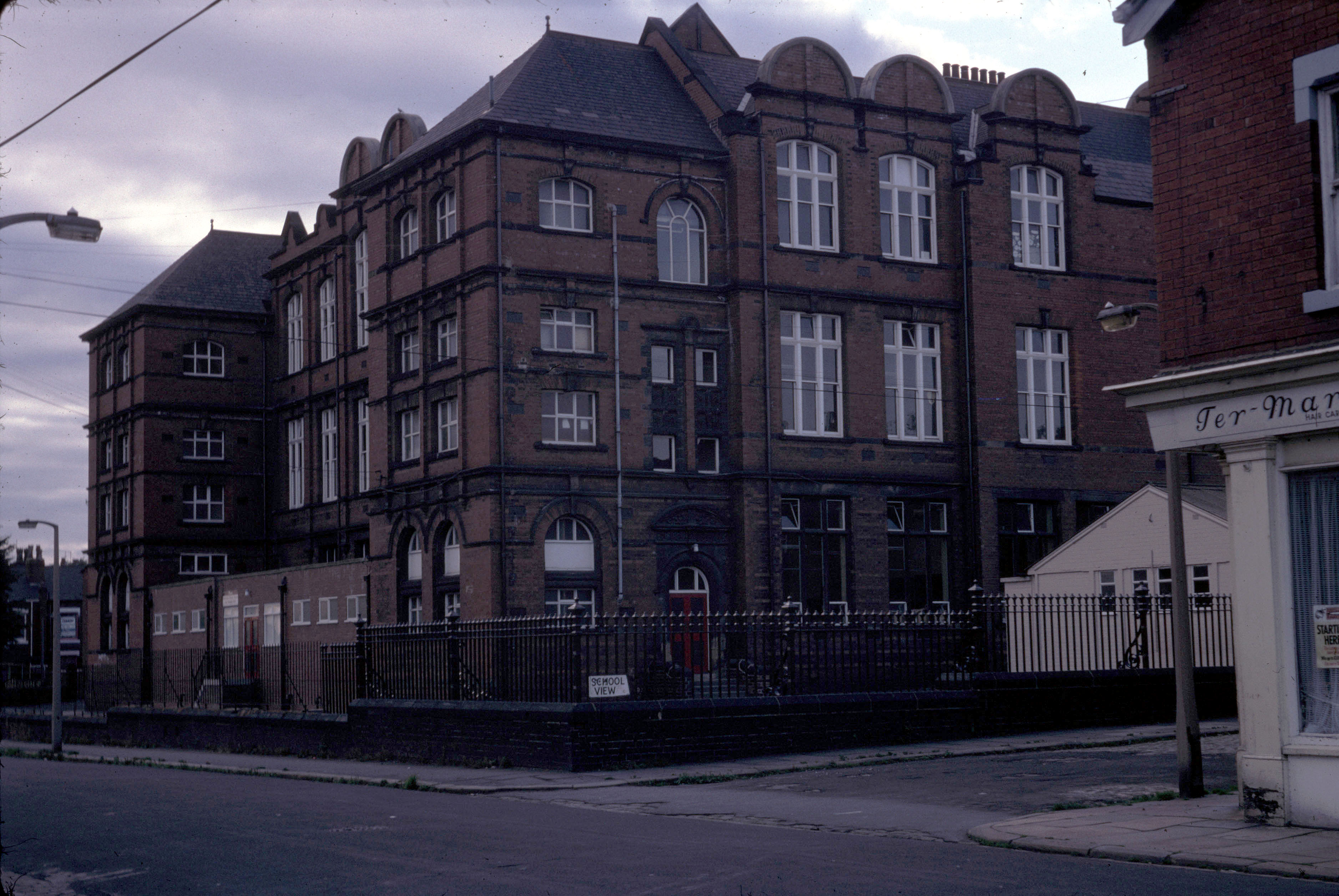
Photo taken 1978

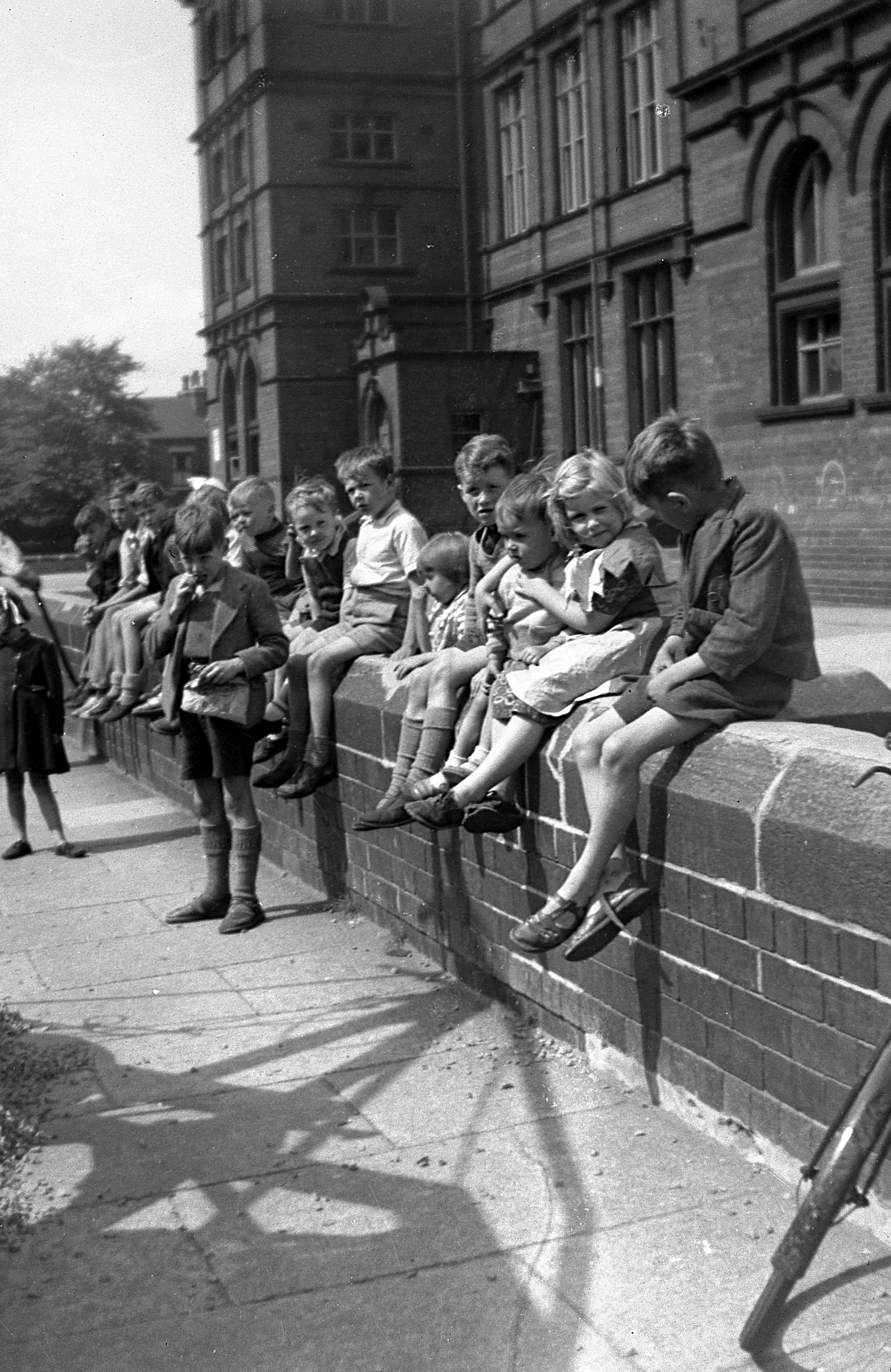
Children on school wall 1949

Brudenell School also known originally as Brudenell Council School was a mixed school for infants, juniors and seniors, on Welton Road in the Hyde Park area of Leeds, England. The large and impressive Victorian building dated from before 1900, and was demolished around 1990. A modern Primary School, built in 1992, now exists on the site.

== See also ==
- Architecture of Leeds
