= K2 (building) =

Residential tower block in Leeds, England

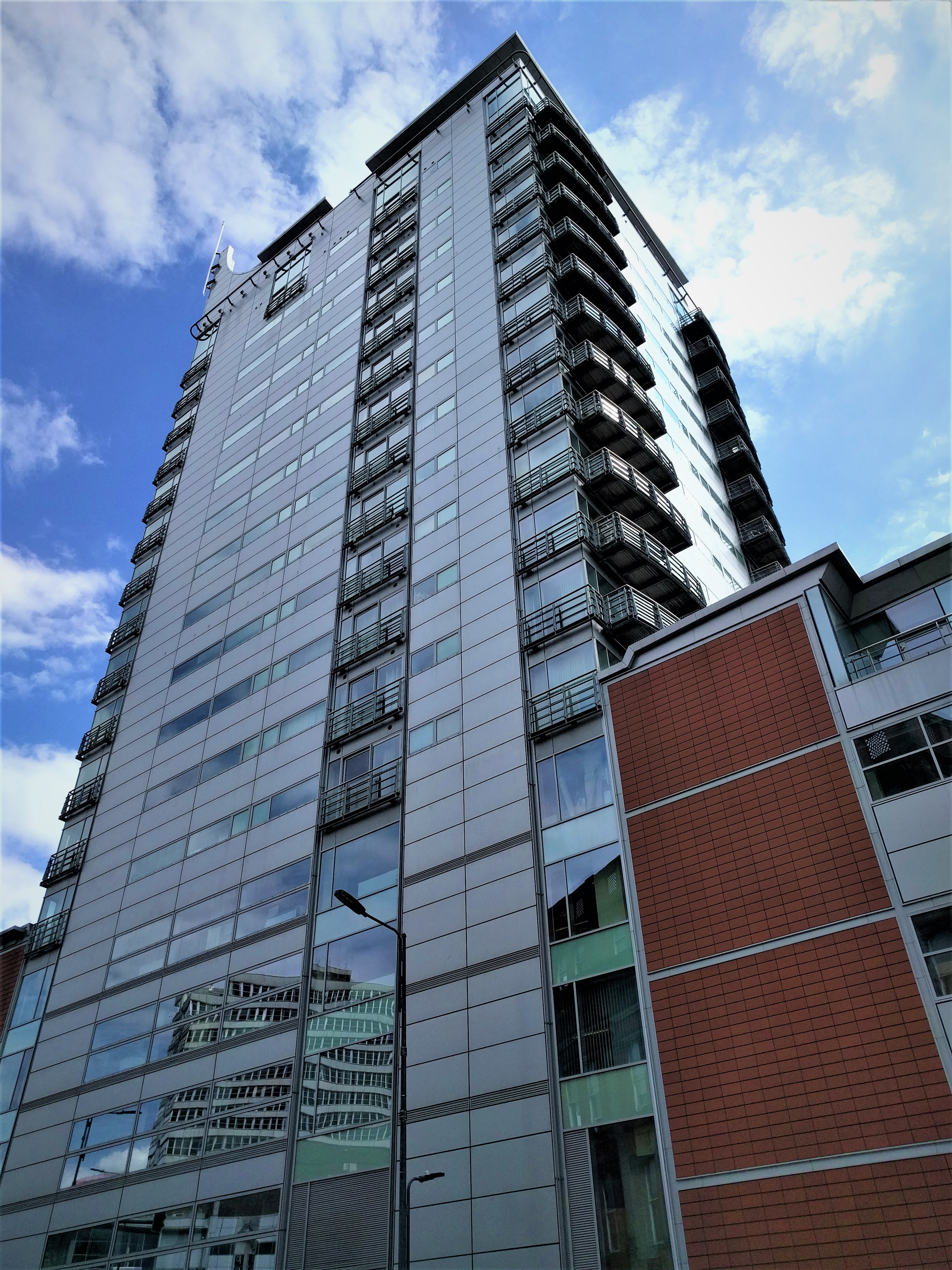
- K2

General information
- Status: Completed
- Location: Leeds, England
- Coordinates: 53°48′02″N 1°32′43″W
- Completed: 1972

Height
- Roof: 74 metres (243 ft)

Technical details
- Floor count: 20

K2 is a residential tower block in Leeds, UK. The building is situated in the city centre, on Albion Street and Great George Street, opposite St John's Centre. The lower two floors contain commercial premises, including a Jongleurs Comedy Club, Bar Risa (a bar with a capacity of 1500) and formerly a Hard Rock Cafe. The building is the joint 9th tallest building in Leeds. The building has 20 stories and is 242 feet (74 m) tall. The commercial parts of the building are known as 'The Cube'. Ventura Outsourcing have 35,000 square feet (3,300 m^{2}) of office space in the upper floors of 'The Cube'.

== History ==
The building was originally built in 1972, as Dudley House, an office block occupied by Leeds City Council, however by the early 2000s, the building had been vacated and was looking tired. It was decided that it would better provide city centre flats. It was reclad and renamed K2.

== See also ==
- List of tallest buildings in Leeds
- Dudley House (Picture)
