= Silhouettes and Statues: A Gothic Revolution 1978–1986 =

Compilation album by Various artists
- Released: 7 July 2017; 8 years ago
- Genre: Gothic rock
- Length: 6:00:58
- Label: Cherry Red

Professional ratings
Aggregate scores
Source	Rating
Metacritic	80/100
Review scores
Source	Rating
The Line of Best Fit	(8/10)
Record Collector	4/5 stars

Silhouettes and Statues: A Gothic Revolution 1978–1986 is a compilation album by various artists which features songs between 1978 and 1986 that influenced the Gothic rock genre. Includes liner notes by journalist and author Natasha Scharf.

== Track listing ==
Disc One
No.	Title	Artist	Length
1.	"Shadowplay"	Joy Division	3:53
2.	"Release the Bats"	The Birthday Party	2:31
3.	"Rema-Rema"	Rema-Rema	4:26
4.	"Shattered Glass"	Paranoia	3:04
5.	"Charnel Ground"	Section 25	3:49
6.	"Floorshow"	The Sisters of Mercy	3:39
7.	"The Female Mirror"	Clock DVA	4:58
8.	"The Black Cat"	UK Decay	2:26
9.	"Dead and Re-Buried"	Alien Sex Fiend	6:00
10.	"Seventh Dream of Teenage Heaven"	Love and Rockets	6:37
11.	"Q Quarters"	The Associates	4:56
12.	"Carnival of the Gullible"	In Excelsis	3:49
13.	"Feels Like Dancing Wartime"	Nevil Luxury	2:43
14.	"Vaguely Human"	Flesh for Lulu	3:23
15.	"Crow Baby"	The March Violets	4:02
16.	"D for Desire"	All About Eve	4:13
17.	"Beautiful Monster"	The Folk Devils	4:38

Disc Two
No.	Title	Artist	Length
1.	"Flowers of Romance"	Public Image Ltd.	2:52
2.	"Bed Caves"	Danielle Dax	3:12
3.	"Moya"	Southern Death Cult	4:40
4.	"Caged"	1919	2:29
5.	"The Hanging Garden"	The Cure	4:32
6.	"Solitary Habit"	S-Haters	4:10
7.	"The Arcane"	Dead Can Dance	3:47
8.	"Saving Face"	Years On Earth	2:53
9.	"Breach Birth"	In the Nursery	6:27
10.	"The Tenant"	Play Dead	5:38
11.	"Ghost"	Part 1	4:25
12.	"Cuts of Love"	13th Chime	5:09
13.	"Ice Cold In"	The Tempest	3:18
14.	"Night Creatures"	Screaming Dead	4:00
15.	"Among the Ruins"	Bushido	5:50
16.	"Friends"	Portion Control	3:25
17.	"Creation"	Actifed	3:08

Disc Three
No.	Title	Artist	Length
1.	"Tabletalk"	Adam and the Ants	5:34
2.	"The Darklands"	Balaam & the Angel	3:35
3.	"Love Puppets"	The Legendary Pink Dots	6:57
4.	"Into the Garden"	Artery	4:51
5.	"Girlsoul"	Salvation	4:46
6.	"In Shreds"	The Chameleons	4:00
7.	"Fugitive Kind"	Schleimer K	4:14
8.	"By the River"	The Bolshoi	5:42
9.	"Screaming for Emmalene"	Gene Loves Jezebel	3:00
10.	"Gallery of Shame"	Lowlife	5:18
11.	"Out of the Moving Life of Circles"	And Also the Trees	3:58
12.	"Is Still"	Siiiii	4:23
13.	"Heroin"	Tabathas Nightmare	3:34
14.	"Angel of Vengeance"	Brigandage	5:36
15.	"Stone Heroes"	Penetration	3:13
16.	"L.A. Rain"	The Rose of Avalanche	7:31

Disc Four
No.	Title	Artist	Length
1.	"Legacy"	Furyo	3:58
2.	"Stay With Me"	The Mission	4:06
3.	"Sāeta"	Nico	3:50
4.	"Fragments of Fear"	In Camera	4:23
5.	"Anonymity"	Dance Chapter	4:51
6.	"Sink Into You"	Ausgang	2:48
7.	"In Our Angelhood"	Cocteau Twins	2:58
8.	"Morbid Silence"	Sunglasses After Dark	4:03
9.	"Trees Come Down"	Fields of the Nephilim	6:31
10.	"Traceys Burning"	Anorexic Dread	9:35
11.	"Take It All"	Red Lorry Yellow Lorry	2:54
12.	"Burning Skies"	Tones on Tail	6:25
13.	"Spit Upon Your Grave"	Blood & Roses	4:14
14.	"High Cost of Living"	The Threat	4:17
15.	"Storm Pause"	I'm Dead	2:53
16.	"Last Year's Wife"	Zero Le Creche	3:53

Disc Five
No.	Title	Artist	Length
1.	"Stigmata Martyr"	Bauhaus	3:44
2.	"Patrol"	The Wake	3:33
3.	"Returning From a Journey"	Specimen	4:08
4.	"Original Sin"	Theatre of Hate	3:32
5.	"Birthrite"	Attrition	3:04
6.	"Things We Never Did"	Sad Lovers & Giants	4:07
7.	"Dr Jeckyl and Mr Hyde"	The Damned	4:32
8.	"The Hill"	Gloria Mundi	5:27
9.	"His Box"	Dalis Car	4:43
10.	"The Diseased Stranger's Waltz"	Inca Babies	5:29
11.	"Ghost Dance"	Death Cult	3:57
12.	"Euthenics"	Modern Eon	3:08
13.	"Mind Disease"	Ritual	2:49
14.	"She Cries Alone"	Skeletal Family	5:17
15.	"Jack"	Bone Orchard	3:46
16.	"Ghost Rattle"	Hula	3:56
17.	"Twister"	Rubella Ballet	8:53
