= William Zinn =

William Zinn may refer to:

- William B. Zinn, Virginia politician
- William V. Zinn, British civil engineer
