= Le Phonographique =

Gothic nightclub in Leeds, England

- The Phono
- Interactive map of Le Phonographique
- Address: Merrion Centre, Leeds, U.K.
- Coordinates: 53°48′07″N 1°32′40″W
- Capacity: 180
- Type: Nightclub
- Events: Gothic rock; dark wave

Construction
- Opened: 1979
- Closed: 2005

Website
- thephono.org

Le Phonographique (often called the Phono) was a gothic nightclub located underneath the Merrion Centre in Leeds. Founded under the name the WigWam club, the venue's 1979 rebranding led to it becoming a location frequented by members of both the local post-punk and New Romantic scenes. Here, the two scenes collided and created the earliest phase of the goth subculture, becoming the first goth club in the world. Playing gothic rock and dark wave music, the club hosted DJs including Marc Almond and Anni Hogan, as well performances by bands including the Clash. The club experienced various owners during its runtime, having its name changed to Rio's between 1994 and 1995, and being known as Bar Phono from 1998 until its 2005 closure.

== History ==
The WigWam Club was renamed to Le Phonographique in 1979, located underneath the Merrion Centre in Leeds. Soon after this name change, it was bought by twins John and Alan Baker, who, along with DJs Jim Bates and Anni Hogan, began catering it to a subcultural audience. In 1985, the Clash played an impromptu gig at the venue while attending. Disc jockeys at the club during this time, such as Marc Almond (a member of Soft Cell), Anni Hogan (a member of Marc and the Mambas) and Claire Shearsby (previously of the F Club), would play gothic rock and dark wave music.

In 1987, it was sold to Geoff Lawrence, however after financial difficulties, the club was closed in 1991. During this time, its major club nights were moved to Ricky's nightclub on Merrion Street, while a number of its other nights began taking place in various venues across the city. The club reopened in 1993, now marketing itself towards a mainstream audience under the name Ashfields. Here, DJ Mixmaster Stilton and promoter Rich K began an indie rock and alternative rock night called Melt on Tuesdays, which recaptured the venue's subcultural clientele, soon becoming its most frequented night. The club was sold again 1994, changing its name to Rio's, with its alternative night continuing on Saturdays. DJ Mixmaster Stilton, Rich K and a number of others purchased the club the following year, returning its name to Le Phonographique and reorganising to the way it had been in the 1980s In December 1998 it was bought by DJ Geoff, who renamed it to Bar Phono. While under this name, there began a rivalry between it and the Bassment, another goth club, which was location around the corner in the Merrion Centre. Bar Phono closed in 2005, claiming "redevelopment". The site is now a retail storage unit.

== Legacy ==
The club was foundational to the emergence of the goth subculture by helping it differentiate itself from the conventions of punk. The Sisters of Mercy song "Floorshow" was inspired by dances that were commonplace at the club. In an article for Dazed, it was stated that the "two steps forward, two steps back" style of dancing originated at the club, due to the pillar in the centre of its dancefloor. The same article also credits the club as invented the snakebite drink.

Various publications and music historians have credited the club as being the first goth club in the world. The club's 1979 founding meant it operated three years prior to London's the Batcave, a club also often credited as the first goth club. Journalist John Robb credited the two club's relationship as a social form of convergent evolution: the independent evolution of similar features in different periods in time. Similarly, journalist Michael Johnson stated that the two evolved independently, with Le Phonographique establish gothic rock music, while the Batcave established goth fashion. However, Johnson also stated that "If the Batcave had not existed, goth would still have happened – maybe without the camp, glammy elements, but it would have happened. Without the Phono, I'm not so sure."
