= Natasha Scharf =

British music journalist

- Occupations: Author, journalist, reviewer, DJ, presenter
- Known for: Goth subculture, rock, metal, progressive metal

Natasha Scharf is a British author, disc jockey, presenter and journalist best known for her work publicising gothic, rock, metal and progressive metal music and subcultures. Since 2019, she has been the Deputy Editor of Prog.

Her first book, Worldwide Gothic, an exploration of the development of the worldwide goth scene, was published on 23 June 2011 by Independent Music Press. A Czech language edition of the book called Gotický Svět was published by Volvox Globator in Autumn 2012.

Scharf was the founding editor of Meltdown Magazine (April 2000 – April 2004) and presenter of the spin-off radio show, Natasha's Batcave, on TotalRock until 2010. She originally joined TotalRock in 2001 as a presenter and producer for a 6-week stint on what was then called "the meltdown show". She went on to guest present on mid-morning, drivetime and Anarchy on the Airwaves evening show before developing the Batcave show around 2004. The last Batcave show was broadcast in 2010. Scharf was also main researcher and assistant producer on Beyond the Pale – a documentary on the goth scene that was broadcast on BBC Radio 1 on 4 November 2002. She has also written for Classic Rock, Metal Hammer, Artrocker and Terrorizer magazines and has worked in both television, and radio with regular shows for the TLRC network. She has been interviewed for various books about the gothic subculture, She also wrote the album sleeve notes to the 69 Eyes – Goth 'n' Roll box set and Cherry Red Records Silhouettes and Statues: A Gothic Revolution 1978-1986 box set

Scharf has been interviewed in various music documentaries including: HIM's Poison Arrow, The Red Hot Chili Peppers Phenomenon, Rock Milestones: The Ramones' Pleasant Dreams, Inside T-Rex: A Critical Review 1974–1977, and for the Adam and the Ants – Stand And Deliver, DVD, which was also broadcast on ITV in December 2006.

== Discography ==
- 2008 The 69 Eyes Goth 'n Roll Box set (Poko Records) (wrote sleeve notes)
- 2017 Various Artists Silhouettes & Statues - A Gothic Revolution: 1978-1986 Box set (Cherry Red) (wrote sleeve notes)
- 2018 The Mission For Ever More - Live at London Shepherd's Bush Empire 2008 (Cherry Red) (wrote sleeve notes)

== Bibliography ==
- Scharf, Natasha (2011). Worldwide Gothic A Chronicle of a Tribe. Independent Music Press. ISBN 978-1-906191-19-1
- Scharf, Natasha (2012). Gotický svět (Trans. Tomáš Hoyer). Volvox Globator.
- Scharf, Natasha (2014). The Art of Gothic. Omnibus Press/Backbeat Books. ISBN 978-1783052639
- Scharf, Natasha with Tarja Turunen (2021). Singing In My Blood. Rocket 88. ISBN 9781910978689
