= Altus House =

Student accommodation building in Leeds, England

Coordinates: 53.8025°N 1.5415°W

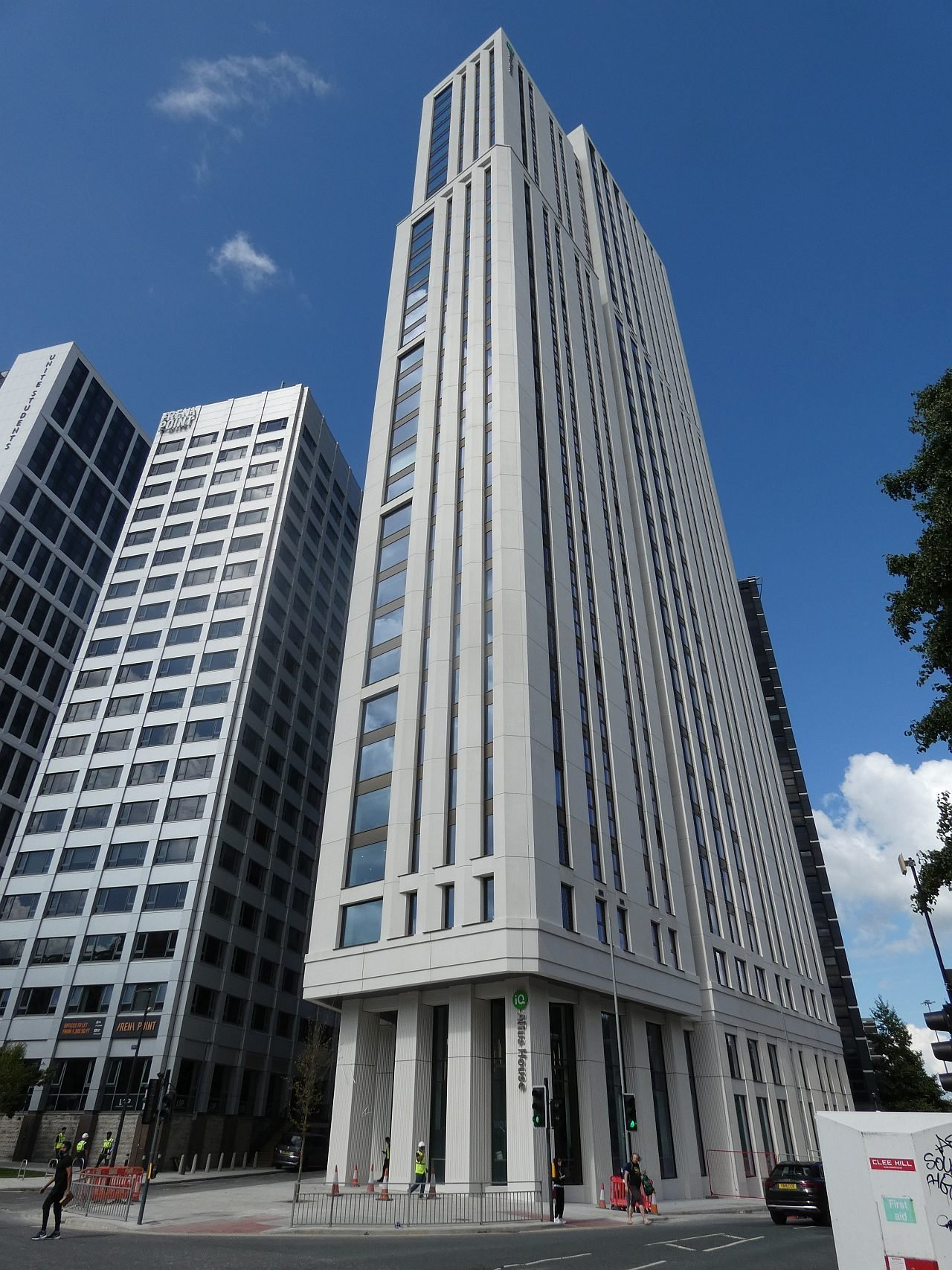
- Altus House in 2021
- Interactive map of the Altus House area

General information
- Status: Completed
- Type: Skyscraper
- Location: Merrion Way, Arena Quarter, Leeds, England
- Construction started: 2019
- Completed: 2021

Height
- Roof: 114 metres (374 ft)

Technical details
- Floor count: 37

Design and construction
- Developer: Zena Ltd / Olympian Homes
- Main contractor: RG Group

Altus House is a 37-storey, residential skyscraper in Arena Quarter, Leeds, West Yorkshire, England. The building consists of over 752 student units. Sources differ as to whether it is 114 or 116 metres (374 or 381 feet) tall; by either measurement Altus House is the tallest building in Leeds and Yorkshire as of 2023, taking the title from Bridgewater Place in 2021.

== Tallest building accolades ==
After topping out in late 2020, Altus House became the tallest building in West Yorkshire, and the tallest in the wider county of Yorkshire. It became Leeds' third building over 100 m (330 ft) along with Bridgewater Place and Sky Plaza, the former of which previously held the title of the tallest building in Yorkshire. It is also the tallest student accommodation building in northern Europe.

== Gallery ==
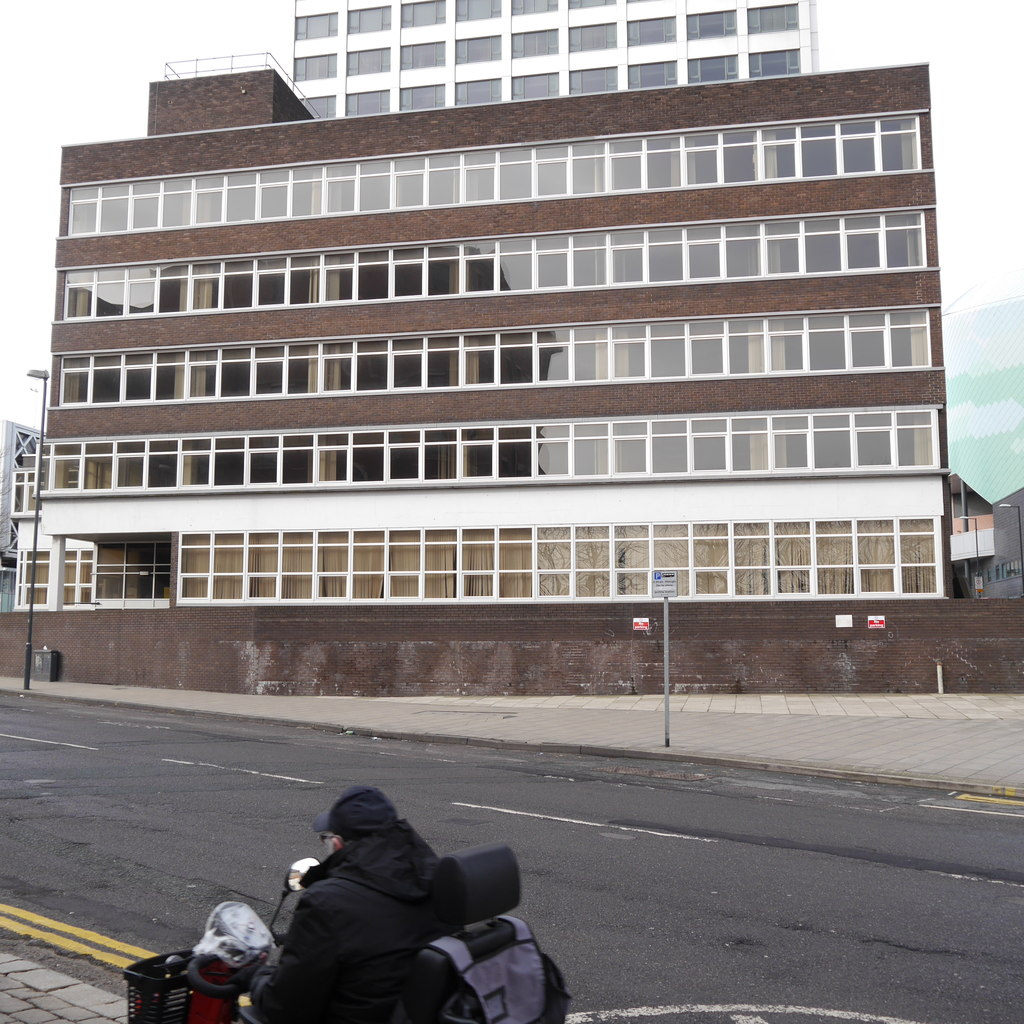
Hume House, which previously occupied the site of Altus House

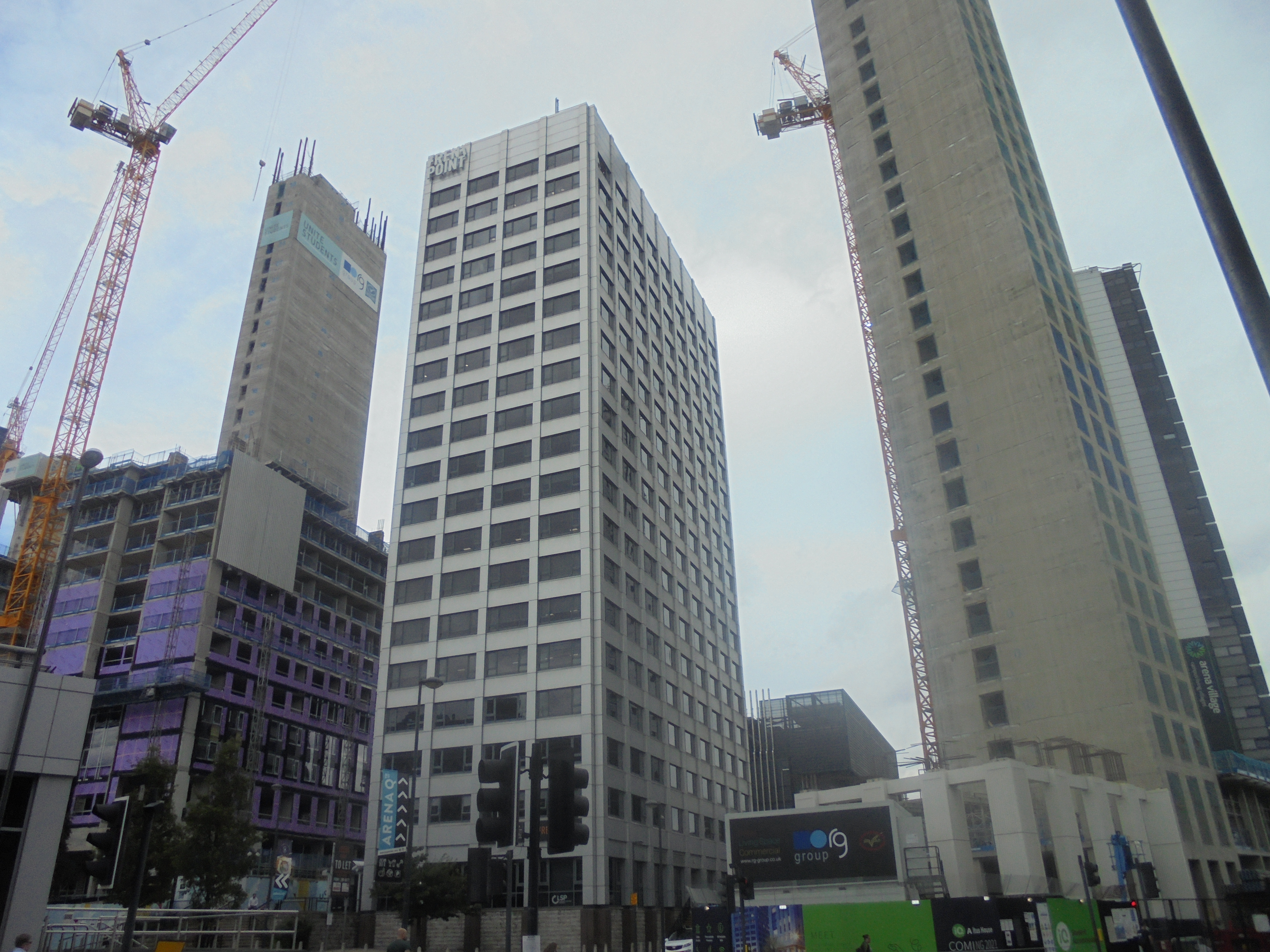
Altus house and White rose view under construction on Merrion Way

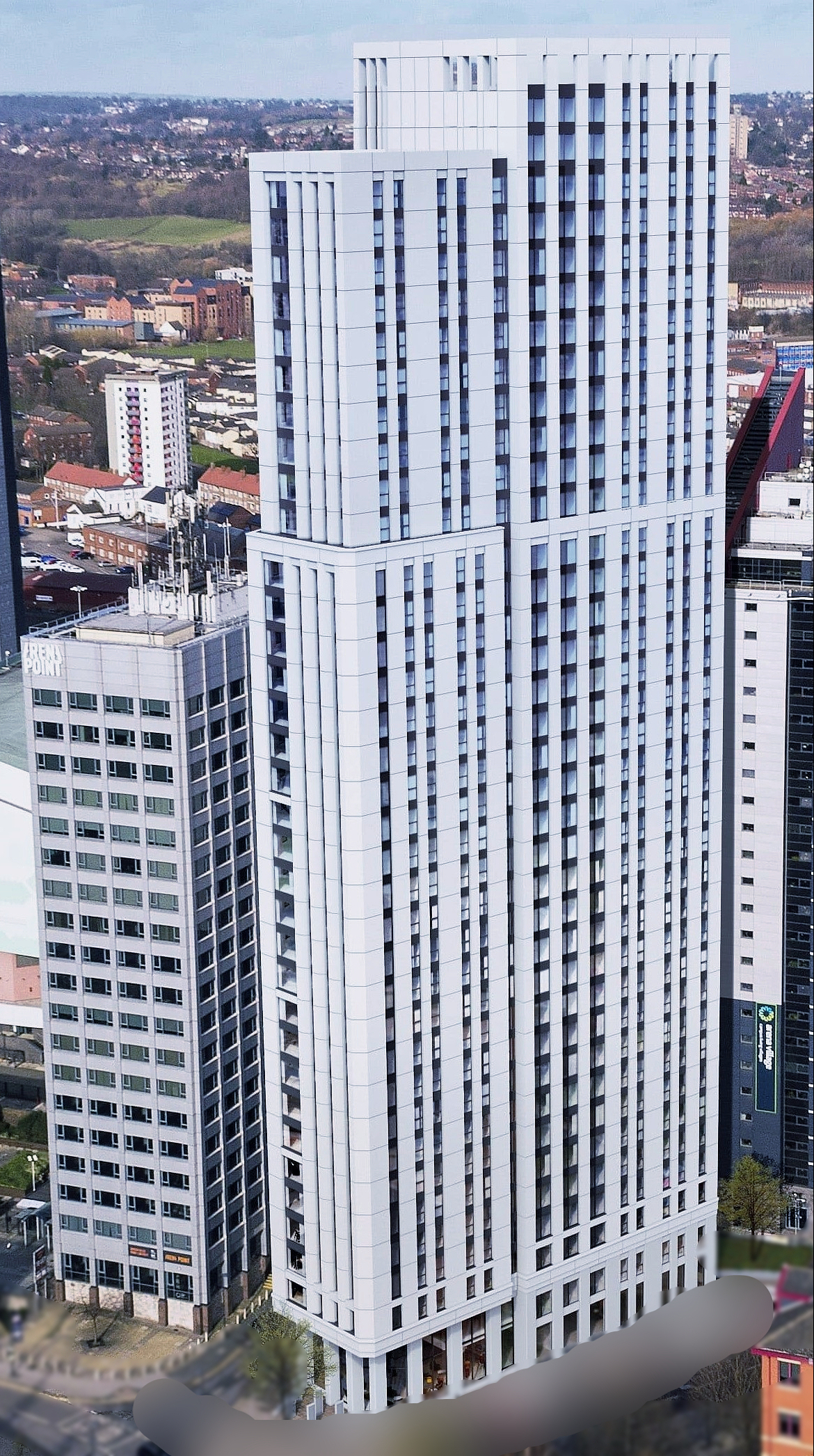
Computer-generated image of Altus House

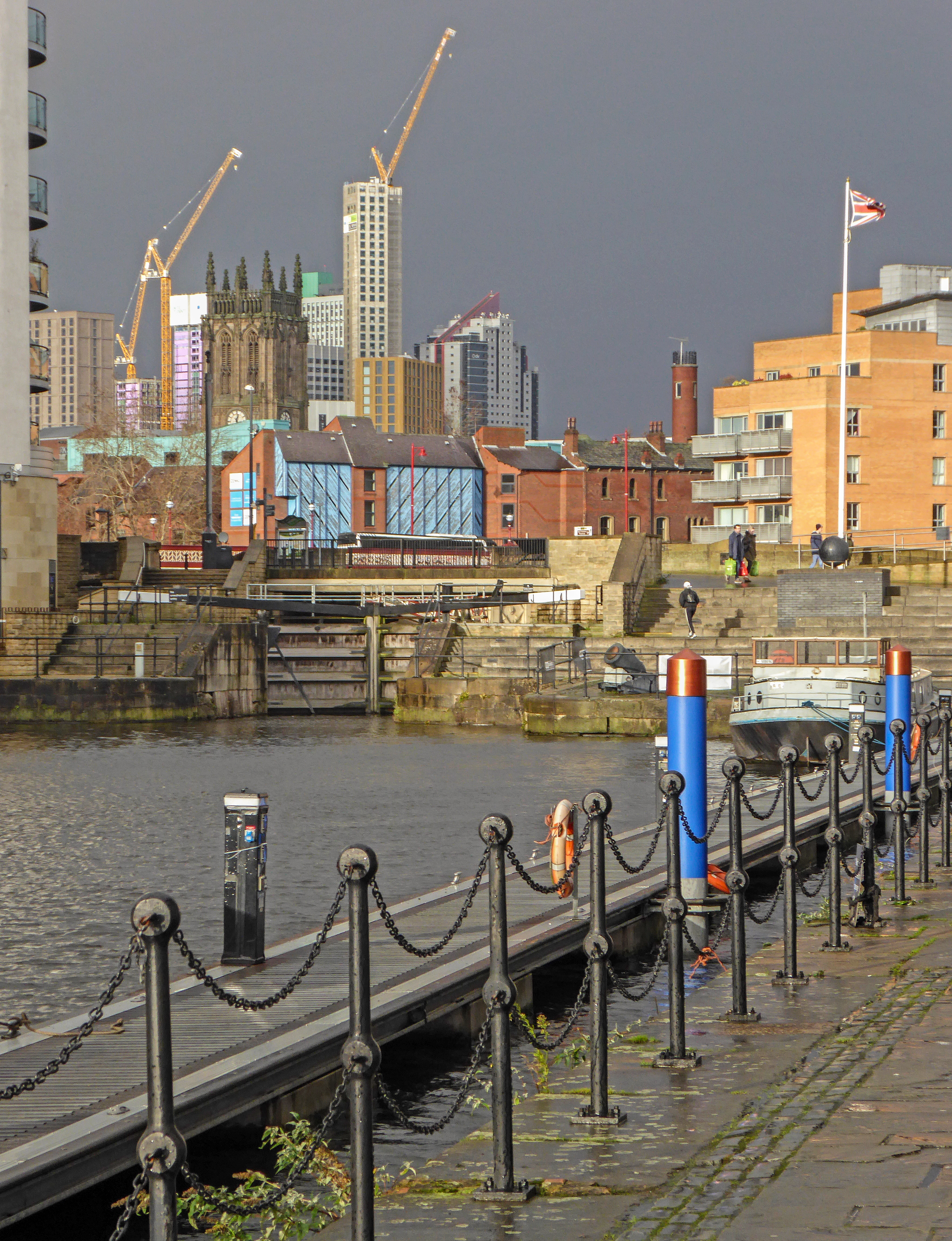
Altus House under construction on the Leeds skyline

== See also ==
- Architecture of Leeds

Records
Preceded by Bridgewater Place; 112 m (367 ft)	Tallest building in Yorkshire; 2020 – present	Succeeded by incumbent
