= Sky Plaza =

Skyscraper in Leeds, West Yorkshire, England

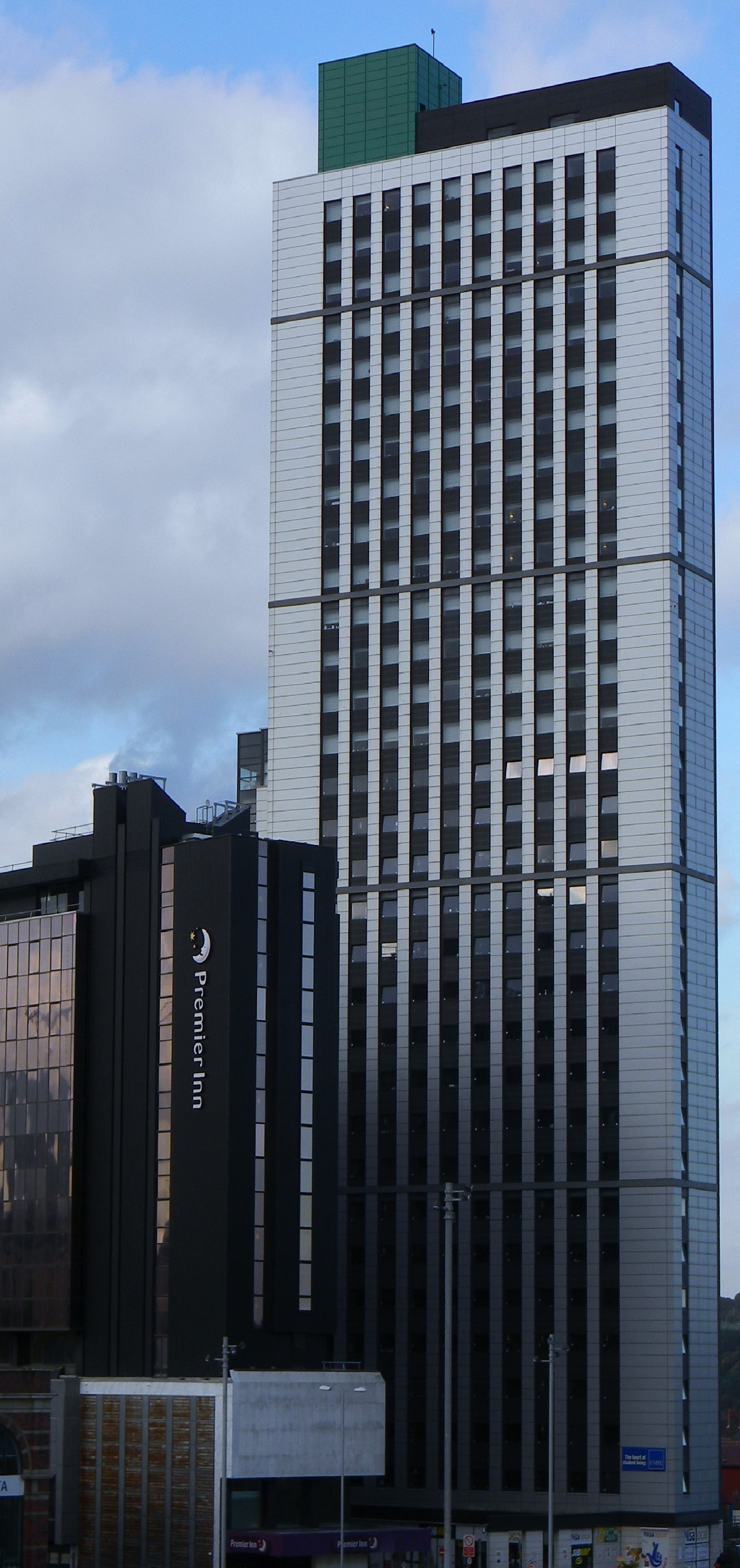
- Alternative names: The Plaza Phase Three

General information
- Status: Completed
- Type: Skyscraper
- Location: Clay Pit Lane, Arena Quarter, Leeds, England
- Coordinates: 53°48′15.9″N 1°32′36.2″W
- Construction started: 2007; 19 years ago
- Completed: 2009; 17 years ago

Height
- Roof: 103 m (338 ft)

Technical details
- Floor count: 34

Design and construction
- Architect: Carey Jones Architects Ltd
- Developer: Unite Group plc
- Main contractor: Shepherd Construction

Website
- www.unitestudents.com/student-accommodation/leeds/sky-plaza

Sky Plaza is a 34-storey, residential skyscraper, in Arena Quarter, Leeds, West Yorkshire, England. It is also known as The Plaza Tower.

== Description ==
The building is the second phase of a development in Leeds city centre, and contains 533 student apartments. It was the world's tallest student accommodation building at 103 metres (338 ft) when completed, although it has since been passed by others including Altus House, Leeds. It can be seen from as far as 25 miles (40 km) from most areas, and is easily identifiable at night with its flashing aircraft warning light.

The original planning application was an approved 26-storey scheme which was altered into the 34-storey tower. The design was submitted by Carey Jones Architects and the main contractor was Shepherd Construction. Construction took place from 2007 to 2009.

== Gallery ==
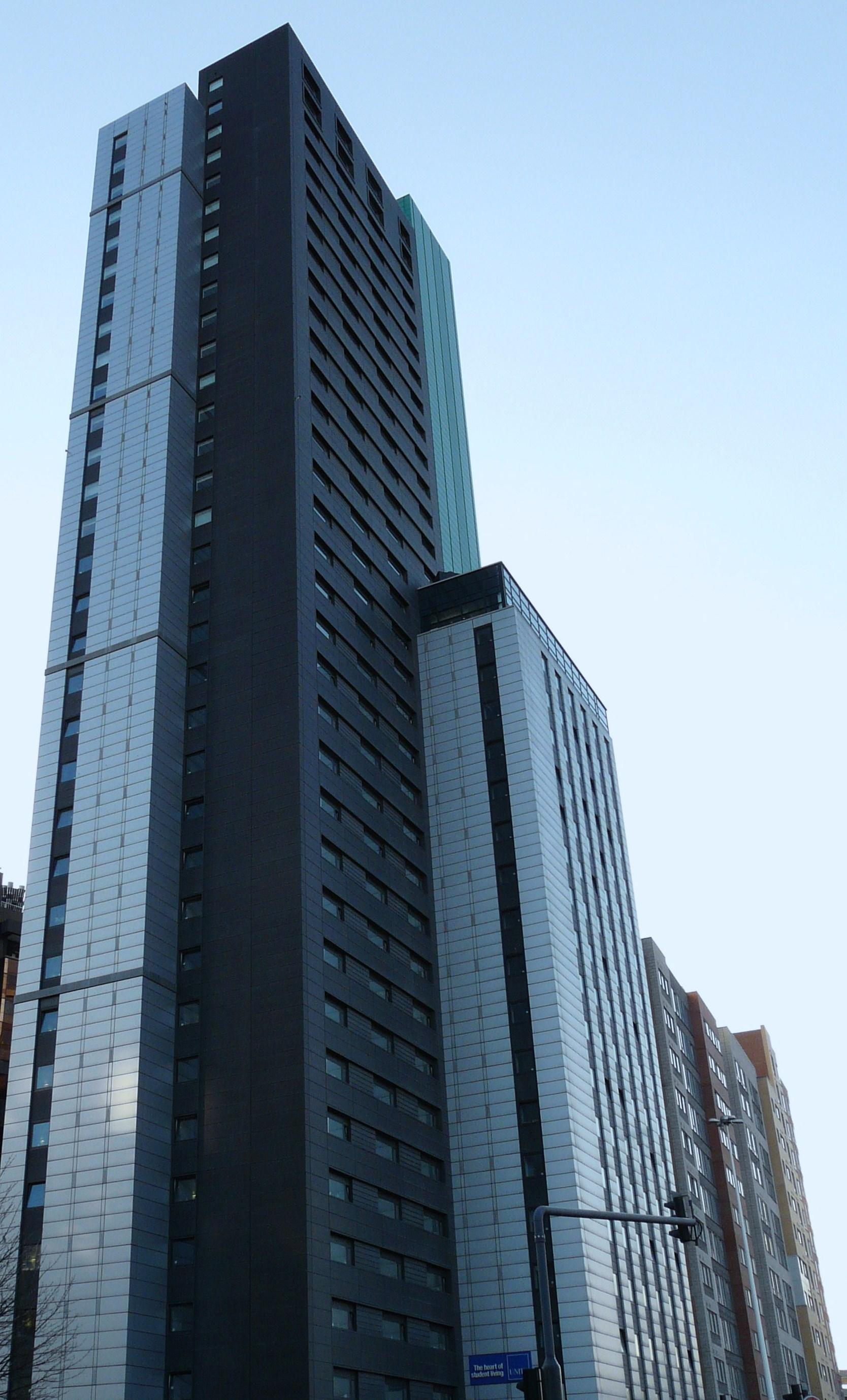

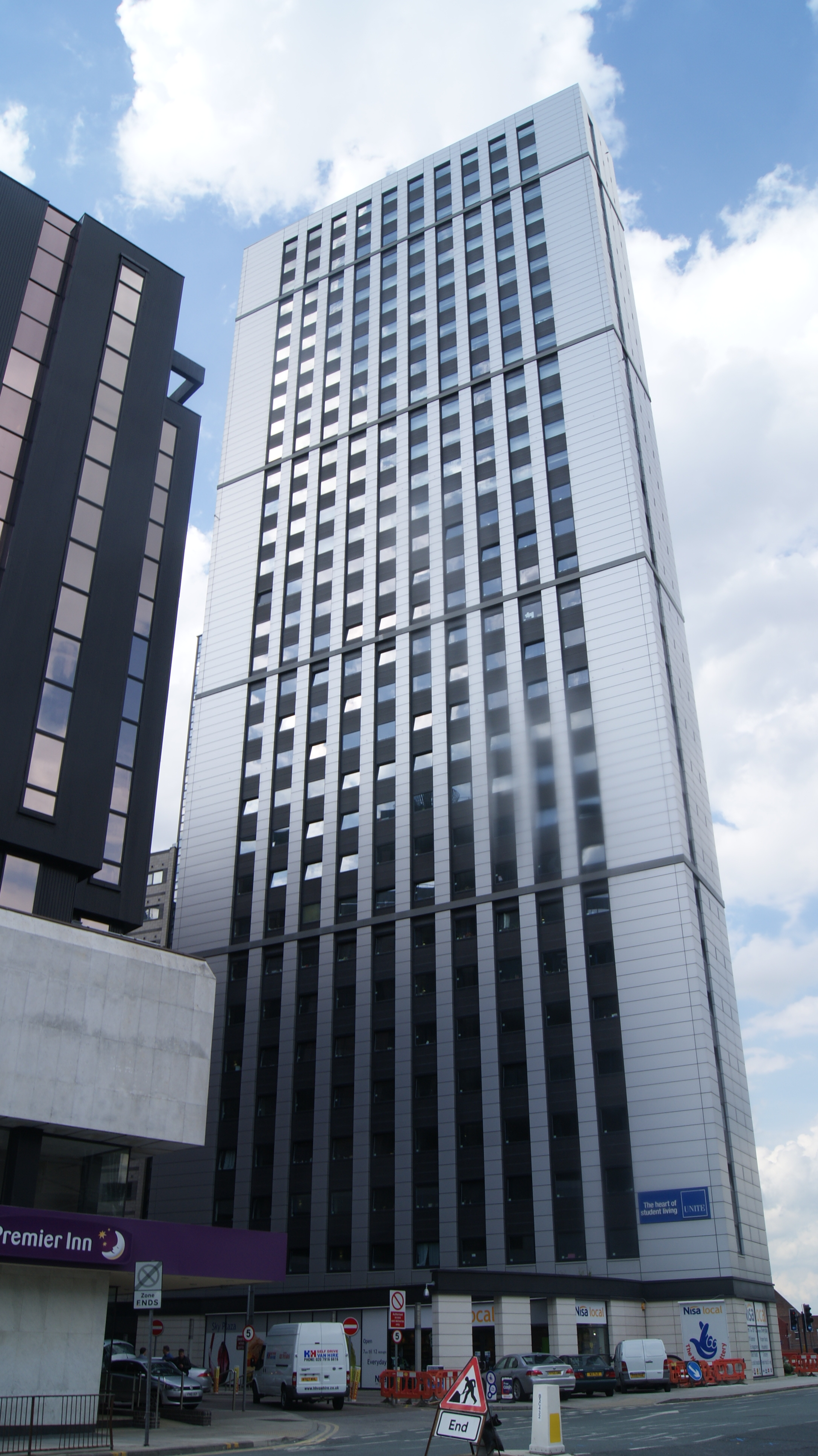

== See also ==
- Architecture of Leeds
