= Arena Quarter =

Coordinates: 53.801°N 1.541°W

- City Centre District
- Location within West Yorkshire
- Metropolitan borough: City of Leeds
- Metropolitan county: West Yorkshire
- Region: Yorkshire and the Humber
- Country: England
- Sovereign state: United Kingdom
- Police: West Yorkshire
- Fire: West Yorkshire
- Ambulance: Yorkshire

Arena Quarter (sometimes referred to as Arena Qtr) is a mixed city centre development with residential, retail and office developments in Leeds, West Yorkshire, England. It is located in Leeds city centre and the area is best known for housing Leeds Arena.

In recent years, a number of high-rise developments have been built in Arena Quarter. This includes Opal 3 and Sky Plaza, both of which are student accommodation. Yorkshire's tallest building began construction in the Quarter in October 2018.

== History ==
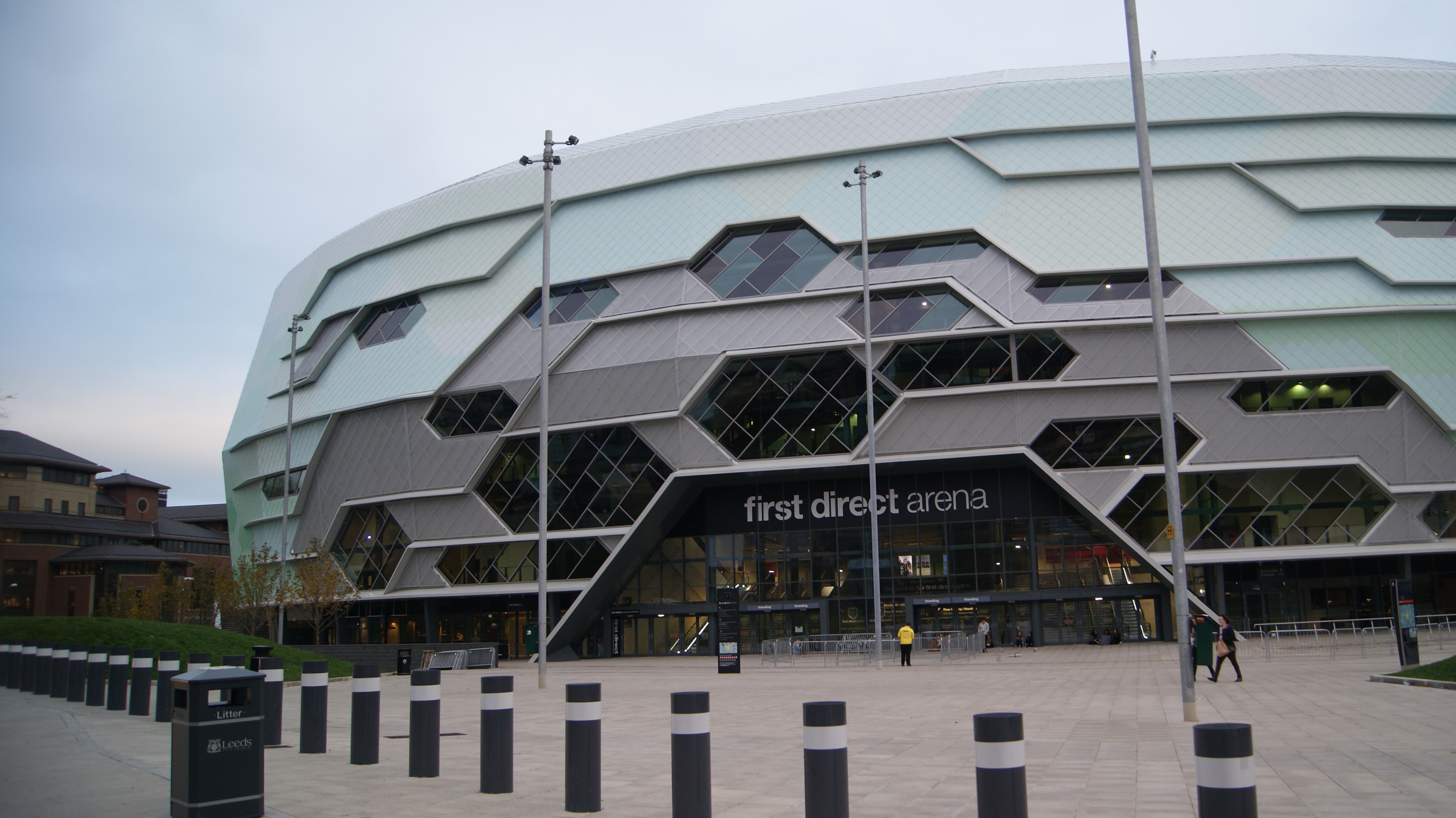
Looking towards the main entrance

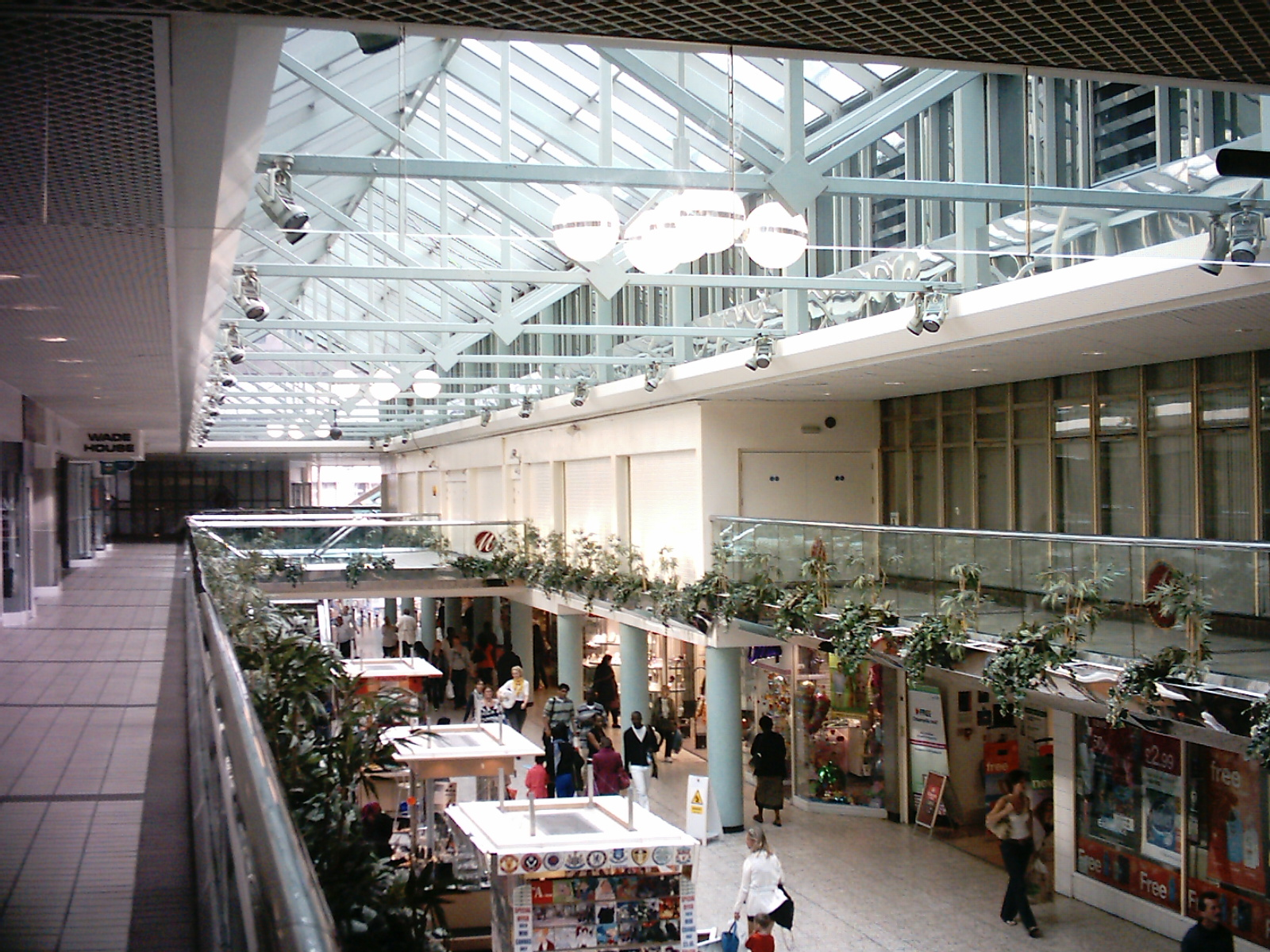
The interior of the Merrion Centre

The area surrounding Leeds Arena was historically associated with Little London, although that district is principally located to the north around Lovell Park. Following the construction of the city's first indoor arena, Leeds City Council designated the surrounding area as the Arena Quarter as part of a wider programme of regeneration and place branding. As a result, the Merrion Centre, which had previously been regarded as part of the northern city-centre retail area, came to be included within the Arena Quarter.

The district lies immediately north of Merrion Street in Leeds city centre. It is bounded to the east and north by the Leeds Inner Ring Road, while Woodhouse Lane forms much of its western boundary.

== Facilities ==
The main two facilities located in Arena Quarter are the Merrion Centre and Leeds Arena. The Yorkshire Bank HQ is also located in Arena Quarter.

== Housing ==
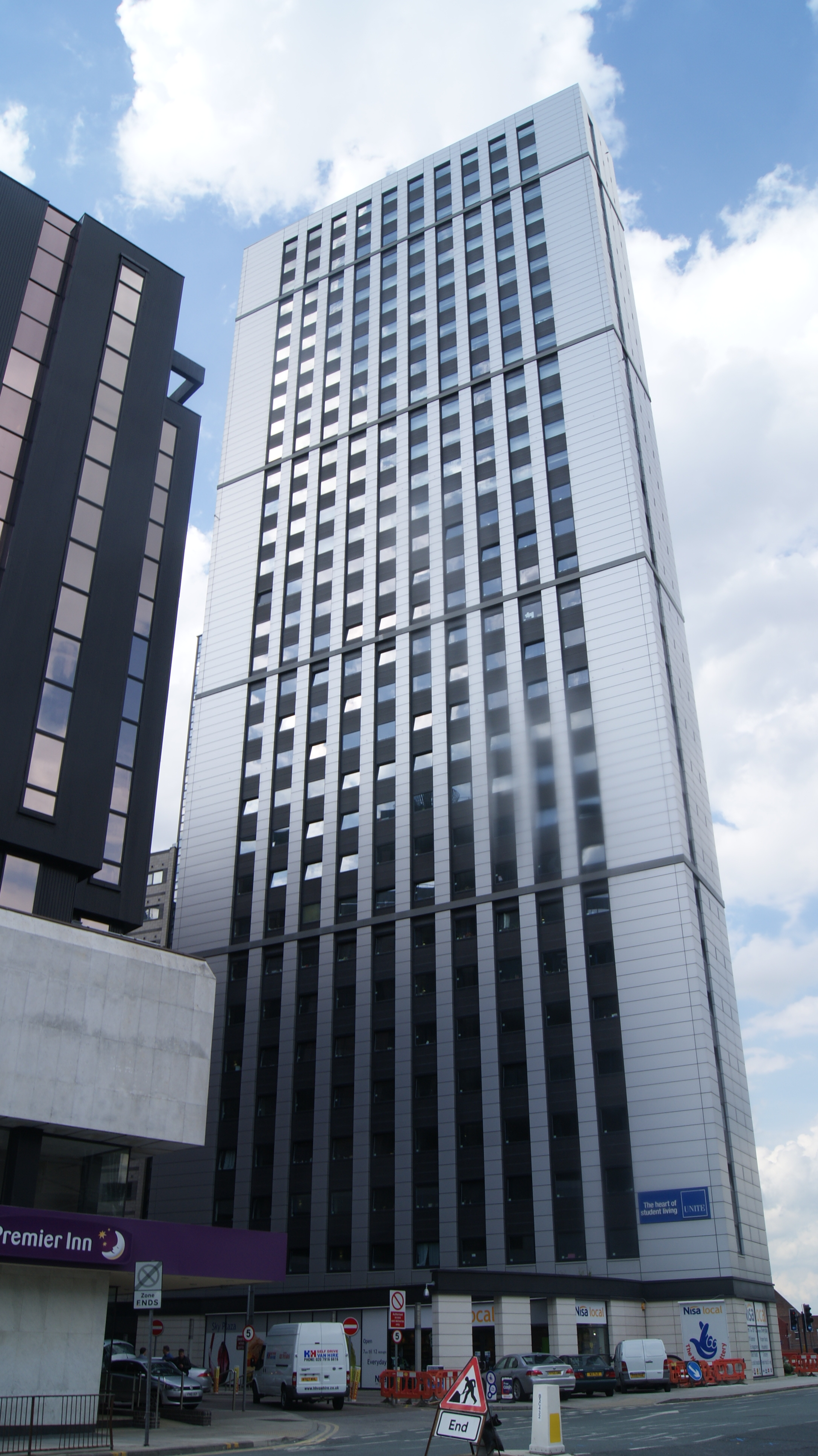
Sky Plaza in Arena Quarter

This part of Leeds has seen major developments around the Arena Quarter. Most of the development has come in the way of student housing, with many tall buildings constructed or under construction. This included two of Leeds' tallest buildings, including Sky Plaza and Opal 3.

In October 2018, plans were announced for a new skyscraper in the Arena Quarter that will become the tallest building in Yorkshire upon completion. Altus House will occupy the site of Hume House, which has been demolished as part of the development.

== See also ==
- List of tallest buildings in Leeds
- Architecture of Leeds
