= Leeds Arena =

Indoor arena in Leeds, England

Coordinates: 53°48′11″N 1°32′32″W

First Direct Bank Arena
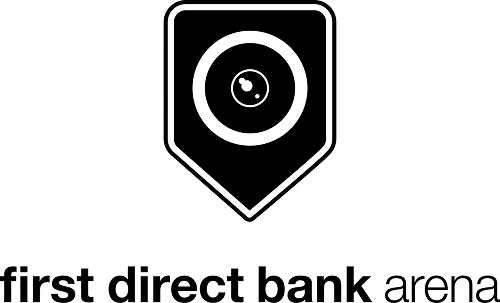

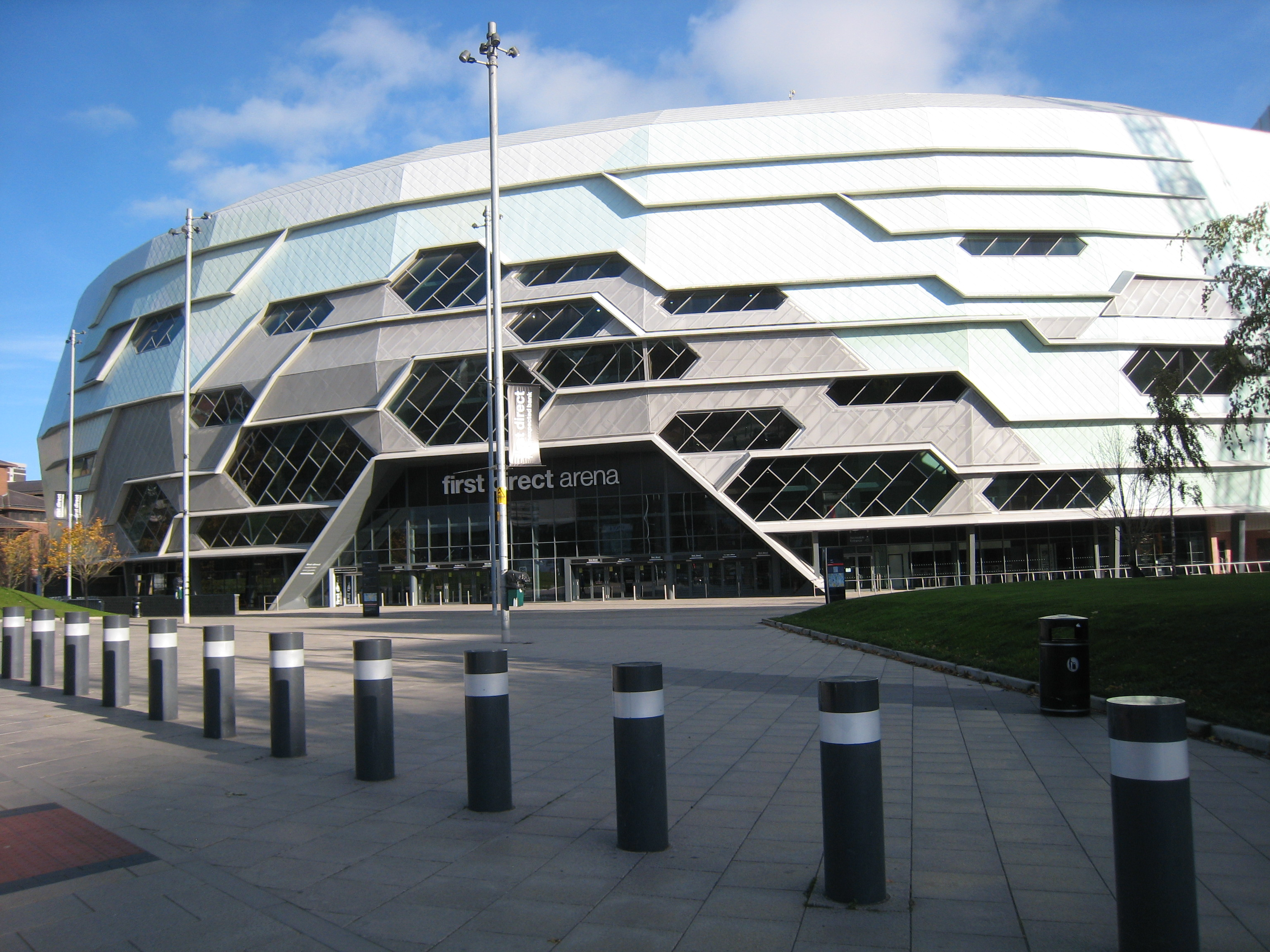
- Interactive map of First Direct Bank Arena
- Address: Claypit Lane; Arena Quarter; Leeds; LS2; England
- Owner: Leeds City Council
- Operator: Legends Global
- Capacity: 13,781

Construction
- Groundbreaking: February 2011
- Built: February 2011 – May 2013
- Opened: 24 July 2013 (first concert); 4 September 2013
- Cost: £60 million
- Architect: Populous
- Project managers: Davis Langdon, An AECOM Company
- Main contractor: BAM Construct UK Ltd

Website
- firstdirectarena.com

The Leeds Arena (currently known as the First Direct Bank Arena for sponsorship reasons) is an entertainment-focused indoor arena located in the Arena Quarter of Leeds, West Yorkshire, England. It is the first in the United Kingdom to have a fan-shaped orientation.

The arena officially opened on 4 September 2013, with Sir Elton John, playing to an audience of 12,000. Bruce Springsteen had, however, held the first concert on 24 July 2013, with an audience of 13,000. The arena's opening season in 2013 later included acts including Kaiser Chiefs, Rod Stewart, Status Quo and Depeche Mode.

The building was named the "best new venue in the world" in 2014 by the Stadium Business Awards.

== History ==
=== Public demand for an arena in Leeds ===
Leeds had been the largest city in the United Kingdom without a major venue to hold music or indoor sporting events. As of February 2010, Bristol and Leeds were the only major cities without an arena style venue. Previously, the Queen's Hall was used for popular music concerts but this was demolished in 1989. Since 1989, there have been a number of failed attempts at building a major venue in Leeds.

An arena has been long requested by residents in Leeds. The consultation on the Vision for Leeds 2004 to 2020 showed a strong demand from the public for a new arena, and the project became one of the city's 12 priorities. The Leeds Initiative formed a Cultural facilities task group to consider options. It appointed PMP consultants whose report outlined the viability of a Leeds Arena, and other potential projects such as a concert hall. The task group recommended that the Council proceed with the development of a 12,500-seat arena.

Whilst this study was taking place, campaigners including the Yorkshire Evening Post lobbied for a new arena to be built in the city. This resulted in a widescale 'Leeds needs an arena' campaign that had endorsements from local artists including the Kaiser Chiefs as well as local businesses and residents. The campaign was well publicised in local media, and included popular Myspace and Facebook groups.

=== Developer and operator competition ===
Following this, competitions began to find an operator and developer for an arena. In March 2008, SMG were chosen as the future operators of the Leeds arena, following worldwide interest from potential operators in the scheme. SMG also operate arenas in Newcastle, Belfast and Manchester and over 200 other venues worldwide. The addition of Leeds strengthens their position in the UK Arena market. SMG's European managing director has stated that Leeds will be its "flagship venue" in Europe and that they expect First Direct Arena "to be in the top 10 in the world within two to three years of opening".

Two main bidders were involved in the competition to develop the arena. These were the Council owned land at Elland Road as one location which would have been developed by GMI Construction and land owned by Montpellier Estates in Sweet Street, Holbeck with Montpellier Estates being developer of the latter site. However, in November 2008, Leeds City Council announced they had terminated the developer competition and chosen Claypit Lane as the site for the new arena and would proceed as the developer. This resulted in a legal challenge from Montpellier Estates. Montpellier's claim for more than £43.5 million was rejected by Mr Justice Supperstone in a Judgement handed down on 6 February 2013.

=== Plans and financing ===
The arena's location, on Claypit Lane is situated at the Northern Quarter of Leeds city centre, behind the Merrion Centre. The land the arena was built on was the Claypit Lane Council car park and land formerly owned by Leeds Metropolitan University. Demolition of the former Leeds Metropolitan building was completed in 2009. Independent economic impact assessments conducted by Yorkshire Forward show that the new arena will bring over £25 million to the local economy every year and bring 300 full-time jobs. The money provided by Leeds City Council will come from part of the proceeds from their sale of Leeds Bradford Airport in October 2007, Yorkshire Forward grant support and revenues from rent and commercial activities. The total scheme costs are estimated to be in the region of £80 million including land costs.

=== Design and construction ===
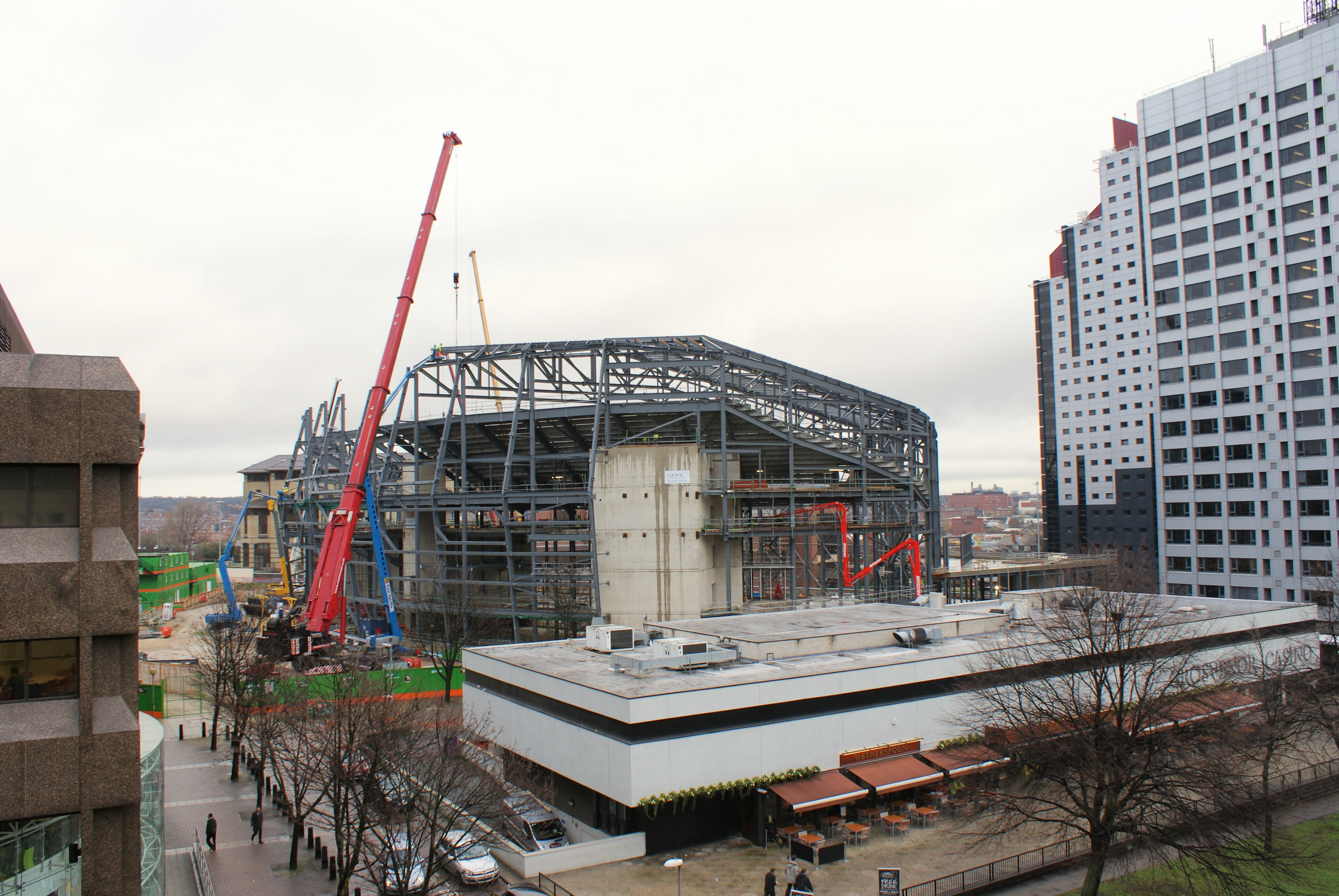
Leeds Arena during early stages of construction (December 2011)

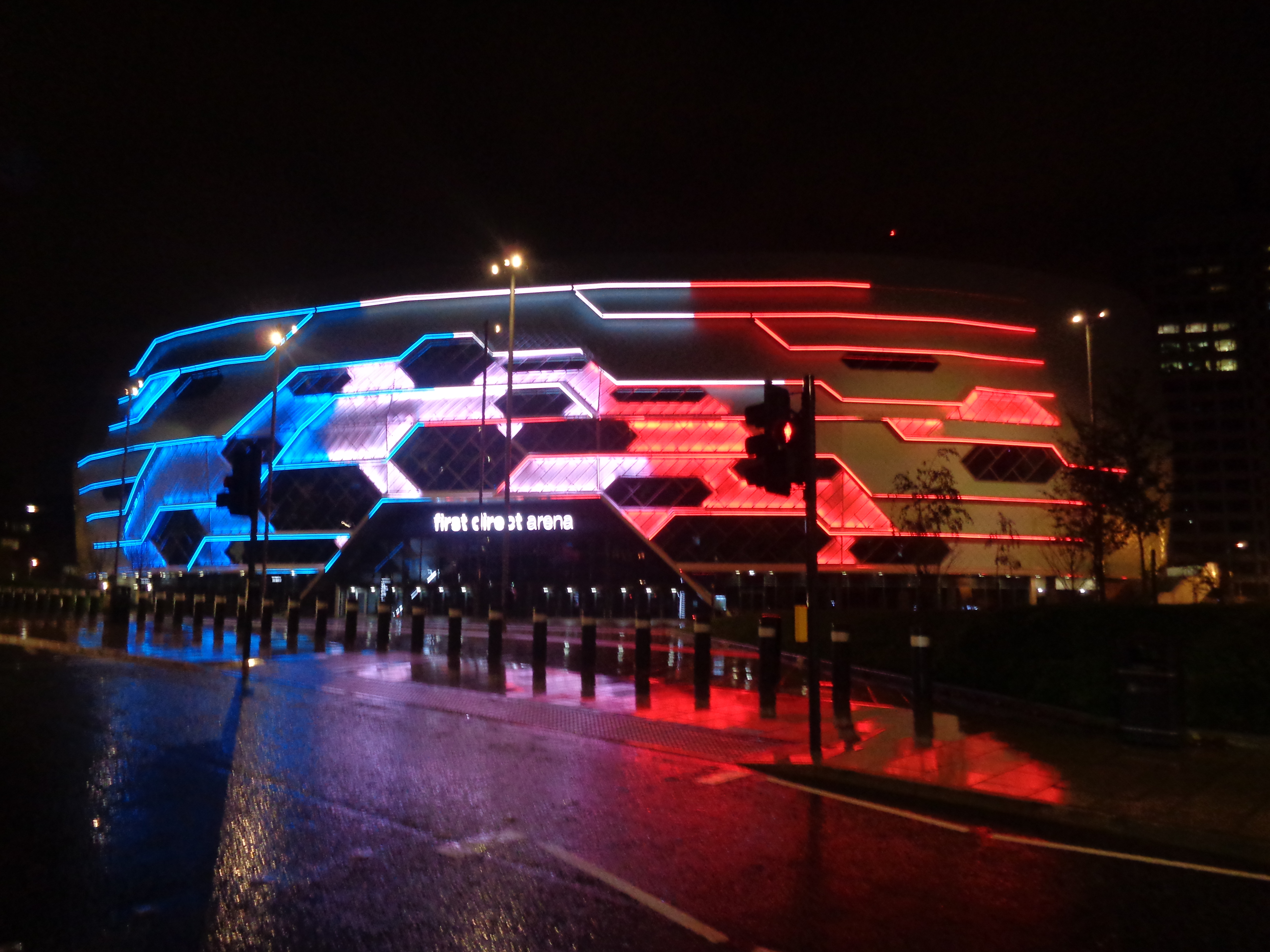
Leeds Arena in the colours of the French Tricolor following the November 2015 Paris attacks

Construction work on the Leeds Arena commenced in February 2011. Construction was completed by May 2013, with a public open day scheduled for 25 May.

The arena is constructed in a super theatre fan shaped format as opposed to the more conventional bowl or horse-shoe seating arrangement commonly used by most arenas in the United Kingdom. The arena promises 'perfect sightlines' from each seat and the longest distance from the stage is 68 metres as opposed to 95–110 metres at a traditionally designed arena. According to the City Council, flat floor seating and 15 rows of retractable seating can be removed to create a huge floor area holding thousands of standing spectators. The interior design is flexible and the Leeds Arena accommodates a range of events including: music concerts in various configurations, comedy events, family shows, such as "Walking with Dinosaurs", ice dance shows and family dance shows, basketball, tennis, boxing, wrestling, UFC and shows ranging in capacity from 1,500 to a maximum of 13,781.

The external design was announced in August 2010. The external design has a honeycomb design. This design uses – a voronoi diagram – to create cellular shapes that are visible on key approaches to the arena.

On an evening, the front of the building has the ability to change colour or pattern dependent on the show or mood of the arena at the time.

=== Naming rights ===
On 2 May 2013, telephone and internet bank First Direct were announced as the sponsor of the arena, with the name officially becoming the First Direct Arena. The naming rights were set to expire in 2018. However, it was announced in March 2017 that First Direct had extended its naming sponsorship for a further five years, continuing to be called the First Direct Arena until at least 2023. In 2024, the naming rights were further extended until 2031. The arena was renamed from first direct arena to first direct bank arena in July 2025.

=== Opposition from South Yorkshire ===
Yorkshire Forward's support and intended £18 million funding has gained much publicity and has been subject to fierce political fighting. Some critics outlined that public funding is common on most recent Arena developments as seen in the Manchester, Nottingham and Liverpool developments. Each arena gained public funding and this was not protested by other established arenas. However, there was some opposition to the Leeds Arena from the owners of Sheffield Arena and Clive Betts, MP for Sheffield Attercliffe, who believe that the arena would adversely affect Sheffield Arena especially as the Leeds Arena would acquire funding from Yorkshire Forward. However, Yorkshire Forward stated that they fully support the development of an arena in Leeds and that an independent economic impact assessment also showed that a Leeds Arena would be of benefit to the entire region. Subsequently, Yorkshire Forward reaffirmed support to provide funding to the scheme. However, following a decision by BIS, central government initially did not authorise Yorkshire Forward to provide funding to the scheme. Soon after, it was announced that £9.9 million funding was authorised by central government. This was met with fierce criticism from Sheffield MPs, but received positive responses in the Leeds City Region.

== Events ==
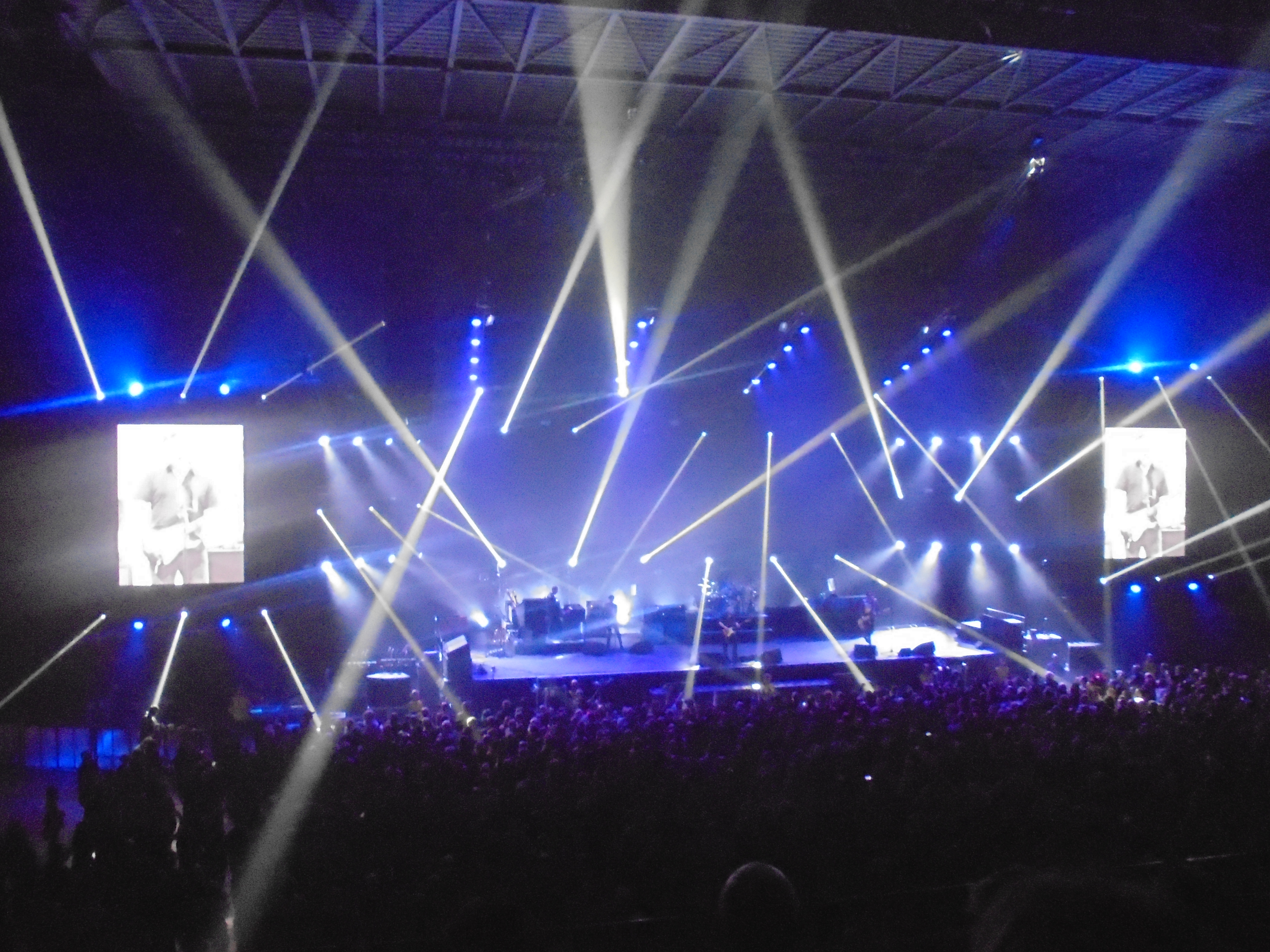
Manic Street Preachers performing at the arena in May 2018 during their Resistance Is Futile Tour

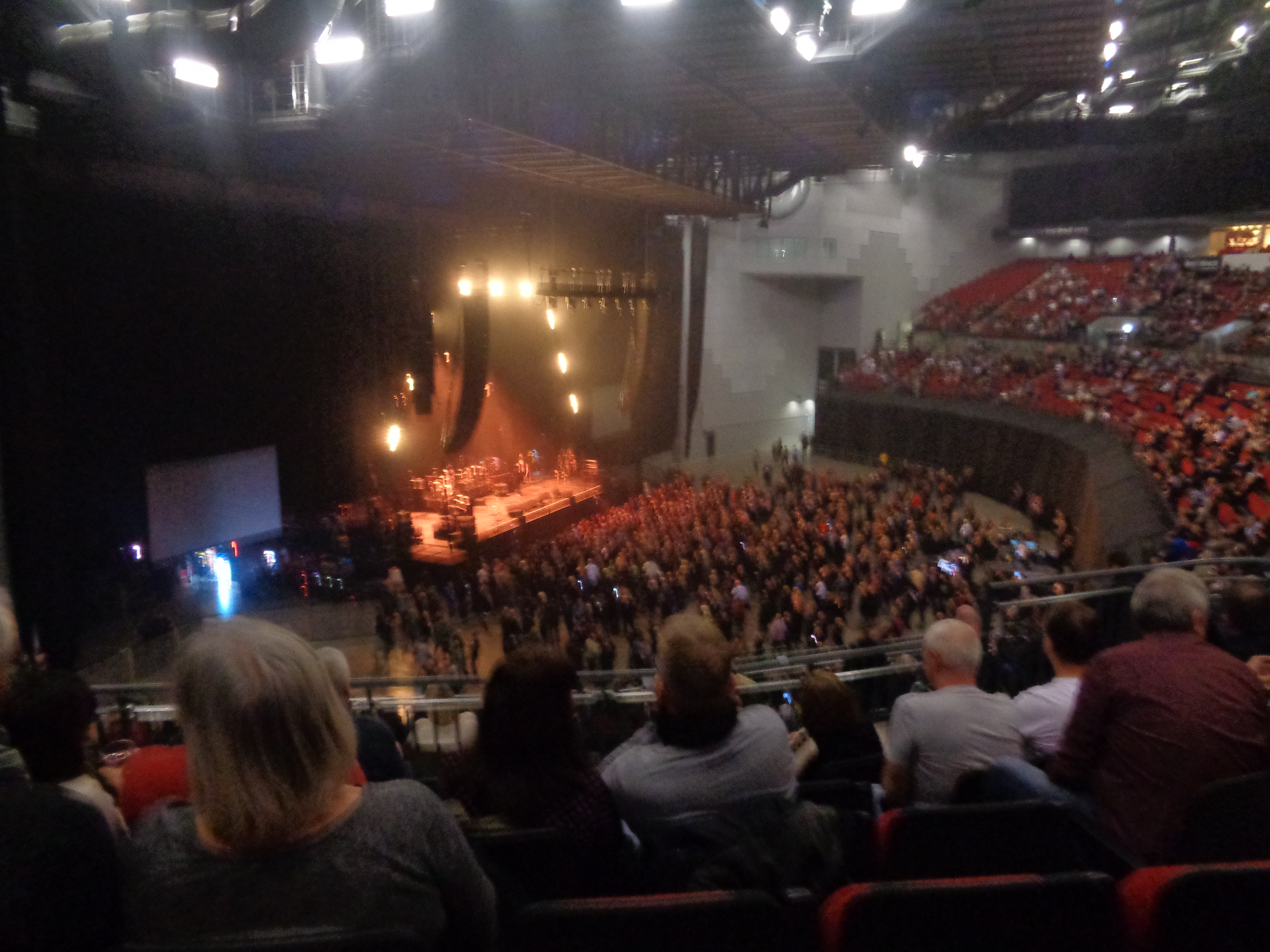
The arena during a concert in 2015 with the retractable rows of seating closed to create extra standing space

The first event in the arena was a concert by Bruce Springsteen on 24 July 2013 although the arena officially opened in September 2013. A wide variety of events have already taken place or been scheduled, including:

=== Music ===
Bruce Springsteen, Elton John, Leonard Cohen, Kaiser Chiefs, Stereophonics, Depeche Mode, Rod Stewart, Andrea Bocelli, James Blunt, Bryan Adams, Slash, Boyzone, JLS, 5 Seconds of Summer, Miley Cyrus, Prince, Dolly Parton, Eagles, The 1975, Status Quo, Pearl Jam, Biffy Clyro, Manic Street Preachers, Catatonia, Eric Clapton, Il Divo, The Who, Alfie Boe, Michael Bublé, The Script, Madness, Morrissey, Lionel Richie, Paloma Faith, Queen + Adam Lambert, Olly Murs, Nicki Minaj, Pharrell Williams, Fleetwood Mac, John Legend, Frankie Valli and the Four Seasons, Bette Midler, Neil Diamond, Simple Minds, Duran Duran, Bad Company, Paul Weller, alt-J, Natalie Imbruglia, Simply Red, Slipknot, Foals, Wet Wet Wet, Peter Andre, Ellie Goulding, Mariah Carey, Jeff Lynne's ELO, Noel Gallagher's High Flying Birds, Gladys Knight, Jean-Michel Jarre, Green Day, Drake, Pet Shop Boys, Kings of Leon, The Weeknd, Adnan Sami, Craig David, Richard Ashcroft, Shreya Ghoshal, Bruno Mars, Iron Maiden, The Cribs, Shawn Klush, Adam Ant, The Stone Roses, Celine Dion, The Killers, Steps, The Kooks, Jools Holland, Elbow, Black Sabbath, James Taylor, Alice Cooper, REO Speedwagon, Kylie Minogue, Nickelback, David Byrne, Gabrielle, Rick Astley, Tom Bailey, Belinda Carlisle, Culture Club, The Prodigy, Courteeners, Bring Me the Horizon, Mumford & Sons, James, The Charlatans, Jane McDonald, Alison Moyet, Tears for Fears, Cher, Rita Ora, Bonnie Raitt, Frank Turner and The Sleeping Souls, The Wombats, George Ezra, Shawn Mendes, Westlife, A-ha, Little Mix, Blink-182, Genesis, Orchestral Manoeuvres in the Dark, Deacon Blue, Liam Gallagher, Sam Fender, Dua Lipa, Blondie, Diana Ross, Diljit Dosanjh, Shania Twain, Ghost, Snoop Dogg, Tenacious D, Louis Tomlinson among others.

=== Comedy ===
Miranda Hart, Russell Howard, Micky Flanagan, Lee Evans, John Bishop, Mrs. Brown's Boys, Harry Enfield and Paul Whitehouse, Michael McIntyre, Vic Reeves and Bob Mortimer, Ricky Gervais, Chris Rock, Russell Peters, The League of Gentlemen, Whoopi Goldberg, Joanna Lumley, Jason Manford, Jack Whitehall, Peter Kay.

=== Performance ===
Cirque du Soleil, Jesus Christ Superstar, Dancing on Ice, Disney on Ice, The X Factor, Strictly Come Dancing, Diversity, BBC Radio 1 Xtra Live, The MOBO Awards, Dynamo, Bear Grylls, The ARIAS Awards, Leeds Gymfest, Harlem Globetrotters, Brian Cox, Nashville in Concert.

=== Sport ===
The arena has hosted WWE Live in November 2013, May 2014, November 2014, April 2015, November 2015, April 2016, November 2016, November 2017 and November 2021. NXT visited in June 2017. It played host to the 2013 BBC Sports Personality of the Year Award, on Thursday 20 March 2014, it hosted week 7 of the 2014 Premier League Darts and has hosted two evenings of boxing matches in 2014 including Leeds own Josh Warrington in a British and commonwealth featherweight title match. On 3 July 2014 it was the host for the Tour de France Grand Départ Team Presentation. It also hosted week 1 of the 2015 Premier League Darts due to the success of hosting week 7 of the 2014 Premier League Darts.

The first boxing event took place on 21 December 2013, which saw Stuart Hall win the vacant IBF championship. Leeds-based boxer Josh Warrington first fought at the arena 21 May 2014. Warrington made the arena his home, headlining the next seven events.

=== Politics ===
The arena hosted the count of various Leeds seats in the 2015 general election including Morley and Outwood where Shadow Chancellor Ed Balls lost his seat.

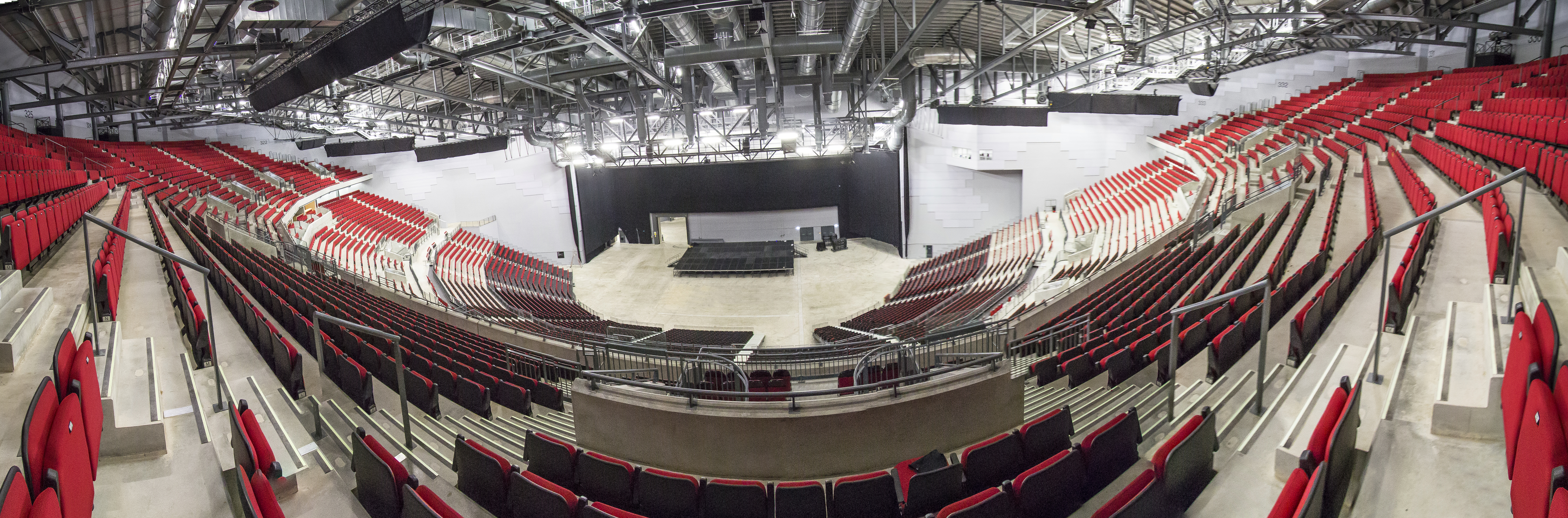
Interior of the arena, taken a few days before its official opening

== Transport ==
The arena is located in Leeds city centre, on Claypit Lane. There are over 7500 car parking spaces within a 15-minute walk of the arena, and Leeds railway station and Leeds City bus station are each a 15-minute walk away. There are bus stands nearby on Woodhouse Lane.

== See also ==
- O2 Academy Leeds, Leeds' second concert venue
- Queens Hall, Leeds, the largest concert venue in Leeds until its demolition in 1989
- Sheffield Arena, the nearest comparable arena
