= Merrion Centre, Leeds =

Merrion Centre
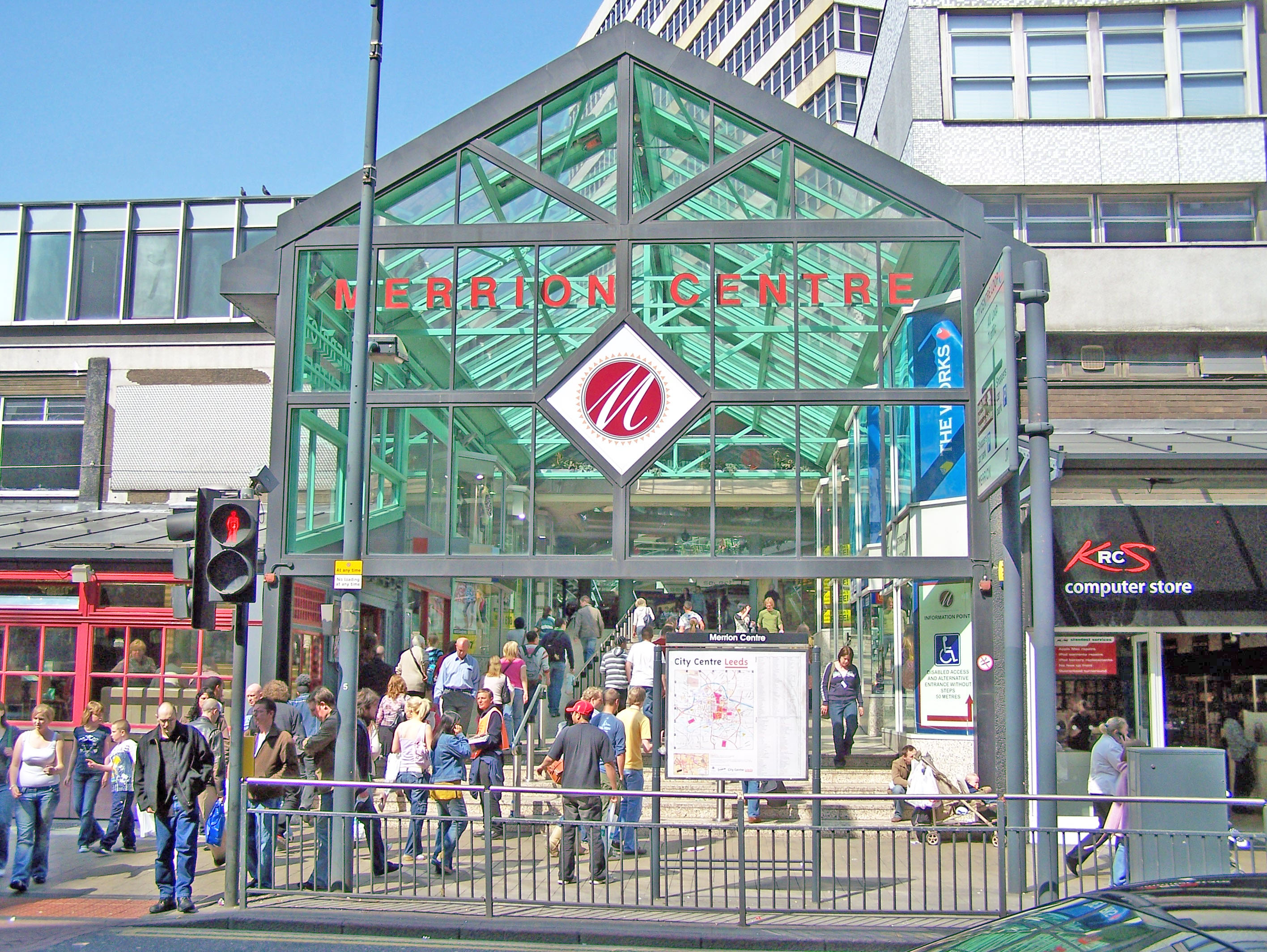
- The southern entrance of the Merrion Centre, as of 5 May 2007
- Location: Leeds, West Yorkshire, England
- Coordinates: 53°48′07″N 1°32′40″W
- Opened: 1964; 62 years ago
- Owner: Town Centre Securities
- Num. of stores: 115
- Floor area: 800,000 sq ft (74,000 m^{2}) including none retail areas.
- Floors: 2 (main retail area only) The centre has 20 floors of office space.

The Merrion Centre is a shopping centre located in the Arena Quarter area of Leeds, West Yorkshire, England. Since opening in 1964, the centre has been owned and managed by Town Centre Securities. Originally open air, the centre had a roof installed during the 1970s.

== Shops and amenities ==
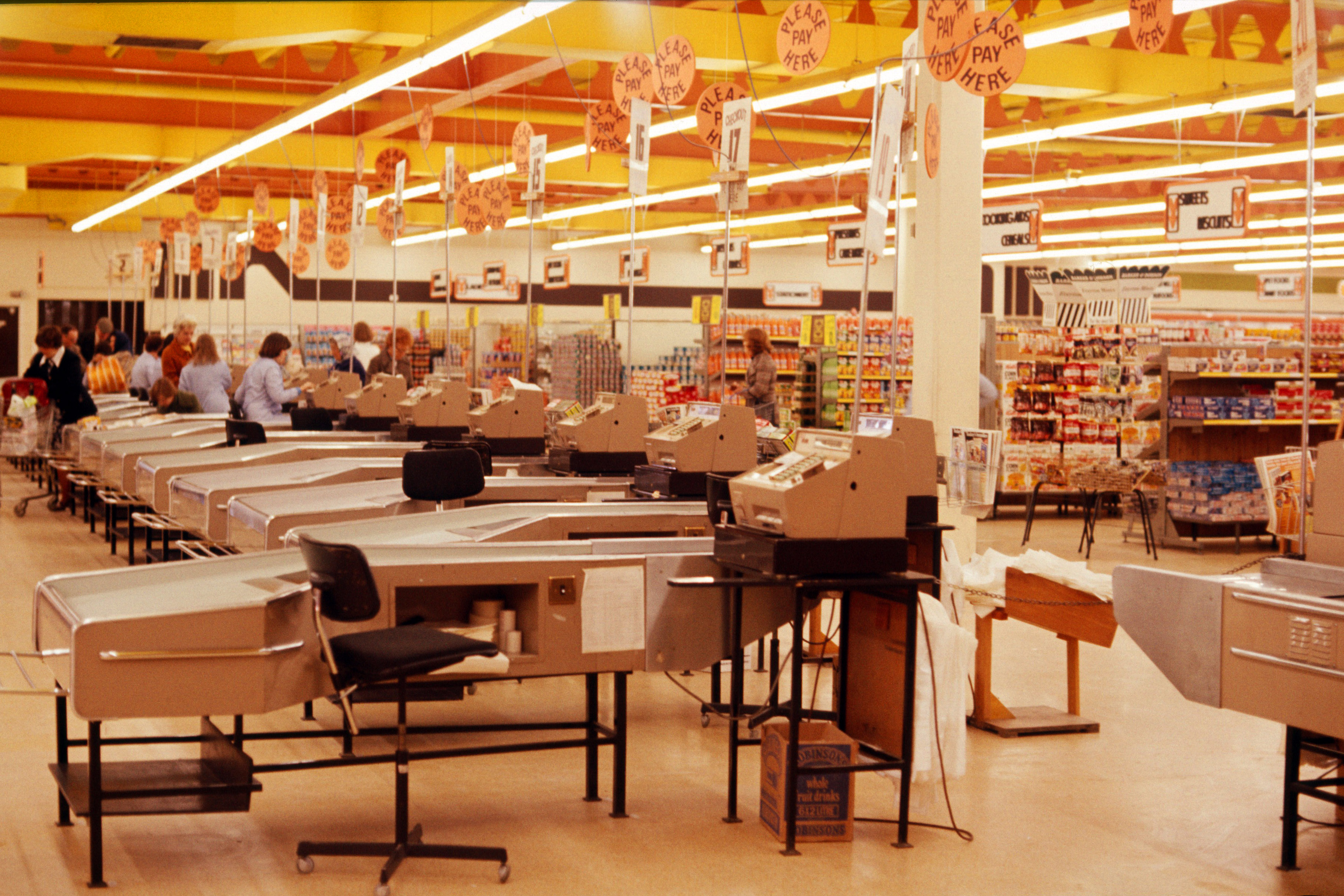
Interior of the Morrisons supermarkets in the 1970s.

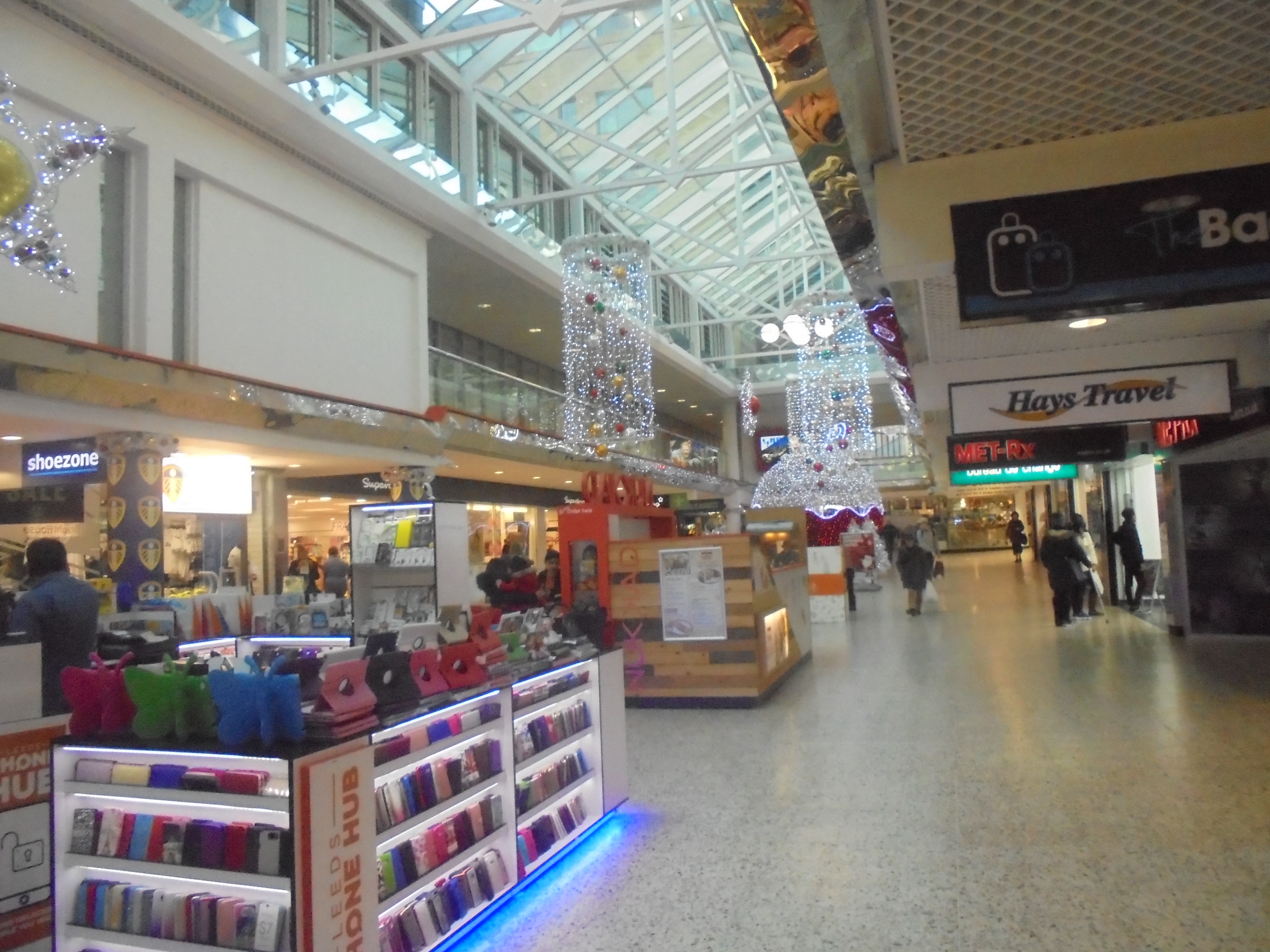
The Interior of the Merrion Centre

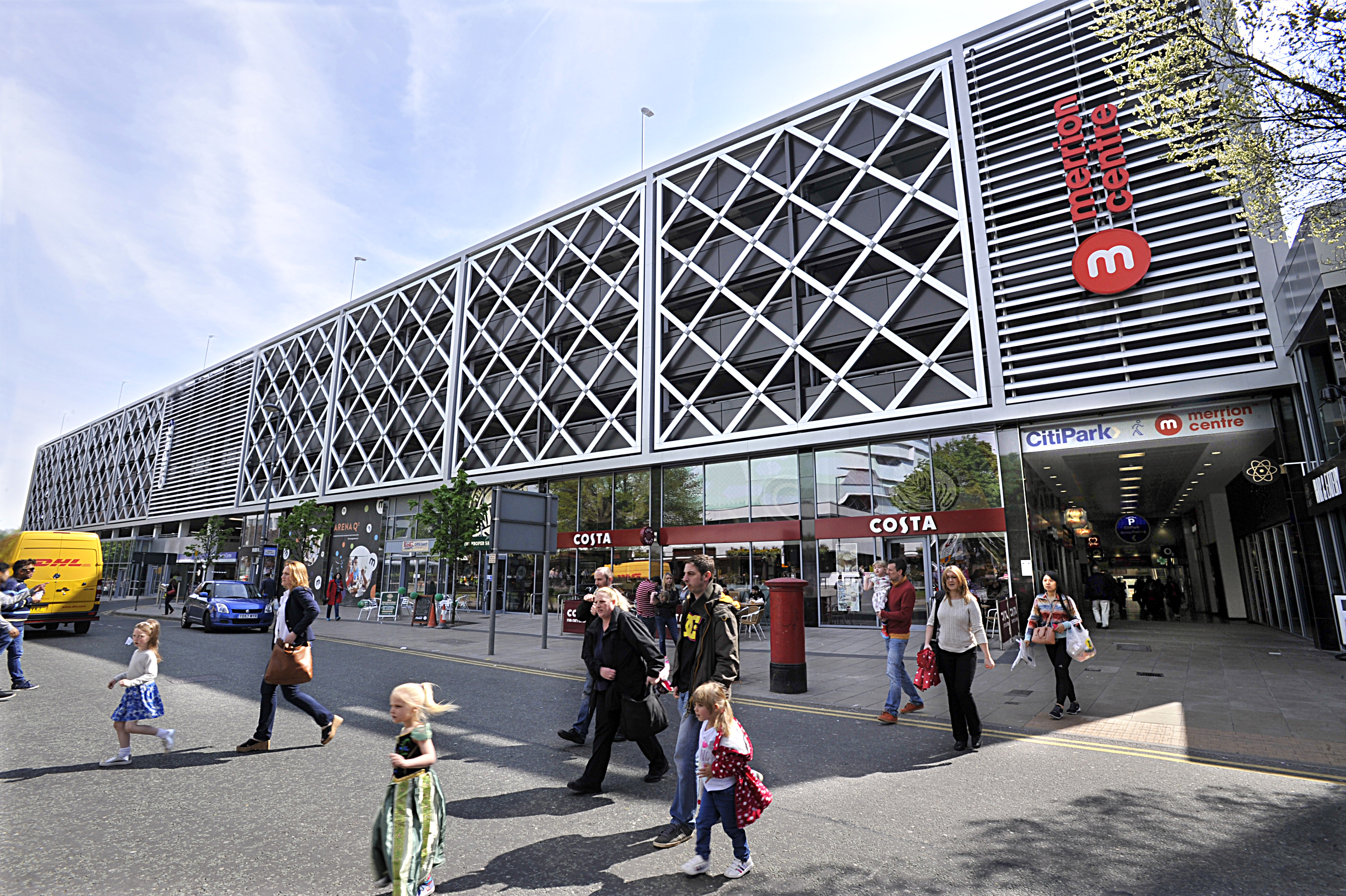
The Arena Quarter entrance and car park from Merrion Way

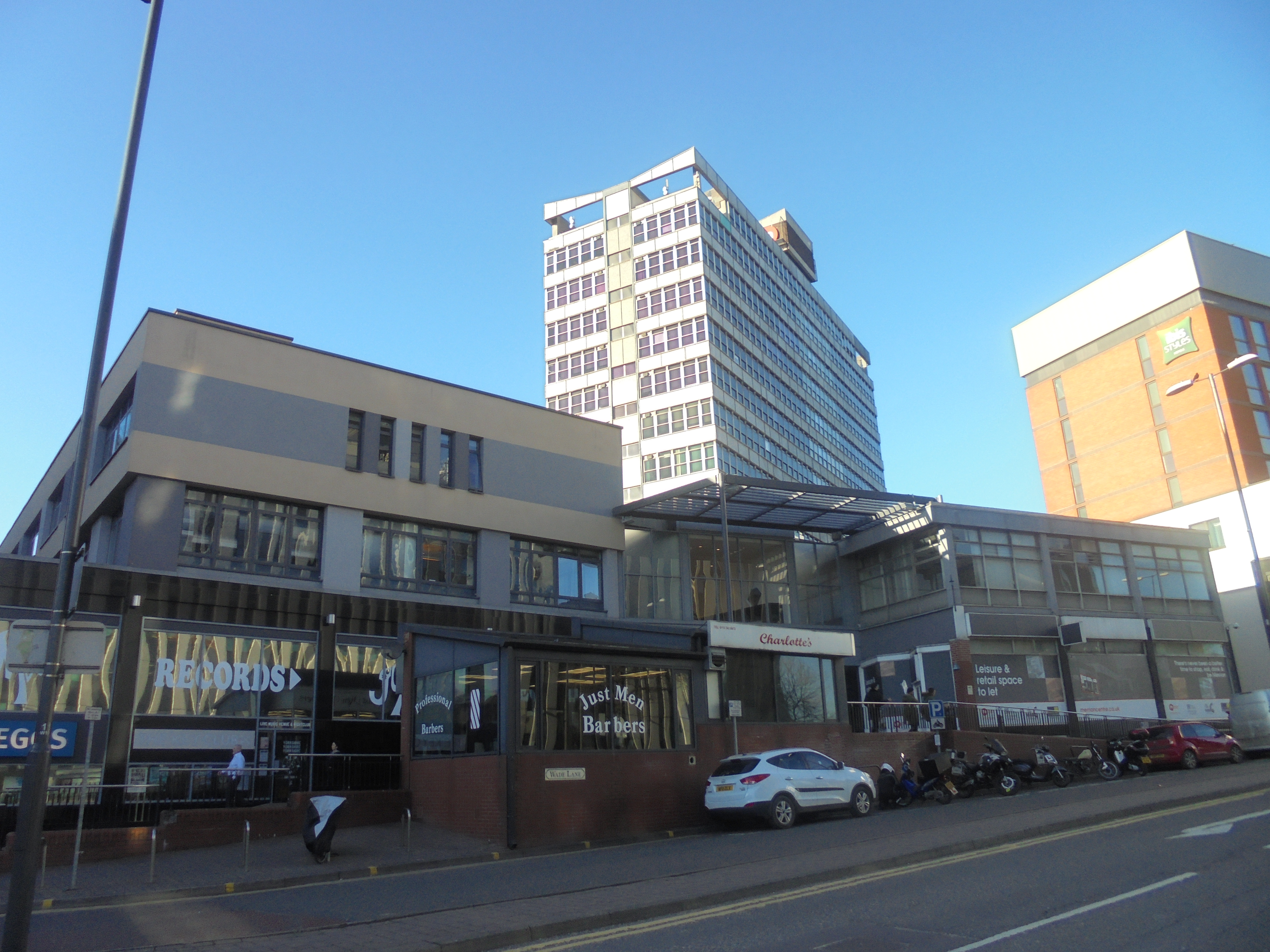
The Wade Lane elevation of the Merrion Centre, 2019

The Merrion Centre is an early example of a mixed-use development including offices, car parking, retail (including a Morrisons supermarket) and entertainment including a bowling alley, a nightclub and several public houses. Currently most retail in the centre is aimed more towards the budget end of the market which means the centre is especially popular with working-class customers and students. The Merrion Market area featured a range of independent stalls, shops and cafés ranging from mainstream but downmarket to idiosyncratic, but was closed to make room for The New Front, an area backing onto the arena which contains restaurants, cafès and leisure facilities.

Since the pedestrianisation of Briggate and the opening of new shopping centres such as Victoria Quarter, Trinity Leeds and The Light, the Merrion Centre has seen a transition from high-end retail chains to more utilitarian and functional chains. The main anchor tenant is Morrisons. Other large retailers within the complex include, Iceland, Superdrug and The Works.

The centre had originally included an Odeon Cinema when it opened, however this closed in 1977 following a screening of Gone with the Wind. It remains empty and unused to this day only opening occasionally for events such as Heritage Open Days. Until recently, the cinema inside was notable in the fact that other than the removal of the seating, it remained unchanged since closing, with original operating manuals and film posters in place and was admired by fans of 1960s and 1970s culture. However, all areas of the cinema have since been stripped back to the bare structure. The ground floor entrance is opposite the entrance to Morrisons and has been blocked up and replaced with cash machines.

One of the nightclubs within The Merrion Centre was the "Bar Phono" (originally known as Le Phonographique), widely reputed to be the birthplace of the Gothic subculture. A pillar was located in the middle of the dancefloor is said to have inspired the unique goth two steps forward two steps back dance.

The centre features one of two examples of Rowland Emett's kinetic sculptures, "The Featherstone-Kite Openwork Basketweave Mark Two Gentleman’s Flying Machine", and other several other Centre-owned artworks by the artist are periodically displayed in the main thoroughfare. There are plaques in the floor at each entrance stating "Private property, no public right of way" to prevent the walkthroughs becoming public footpaths.

== History ==
When opened in 1964, the Yorkshire Evening Post said the centre emulated what every successful large town and city wanted to build. The builders were Parkinsons and the structural engineers William V. Zinn & Associates. Parkinsons described the centre as "the most advanced shopping and entertainment centre in the country" and cost £3m to build.

The former Barclays Bank on the front of the Merrion Centre was converted into 'PRYZM' which has become a popular Leeds nightclub.

Much of The Merrion Centre remains almost unchanged since its construction. With many other cities renovating their equivalents of The Merrion Centre (the reconstruction of the Bullring, Birmingham, the Arndale Centre in Manchester being partially rebuilt and Eldon Square in Newcastle Upon Tyne being renovated), Leeds city centre's largest shopping centre was beginning to look dated. In June 2007 renovation began, concentrating on the western side of the centre. Since then additional developments have taken place including a new lighting scheme to the "new front" (launched 2015). In 2012 the Merrion Superstore market hall closed and opened up as Pure Gym in 2013.

In summer 2016, The Merrion Centre was undergoing major refurbishment. The western side of the centre was being extended to accommodate new refurbished council offices, as well as new restaurants and retail units. New tenants had moved in such as a new Sainsbury's Local, and the centre's Morrisons supermarket has been rebranded to fit the company's new corporate image, with major extension and refurbishment inside.

Woolworths' relocation to the Merrion Centre, from Briggate (now the House of Fraser) in the early 1990s provided the centre with another major retailer and increased footfall. The Morrisons in the centre is the main supermarket in the city centre and has seen a surge in custom since the building of many city centre flats in the property boom of the 2000s. However most of these are towards the southern end of the city centre, and for them the Morrisons in The Penny Hill Centre, Hunslet is nearer and also offers free parking.

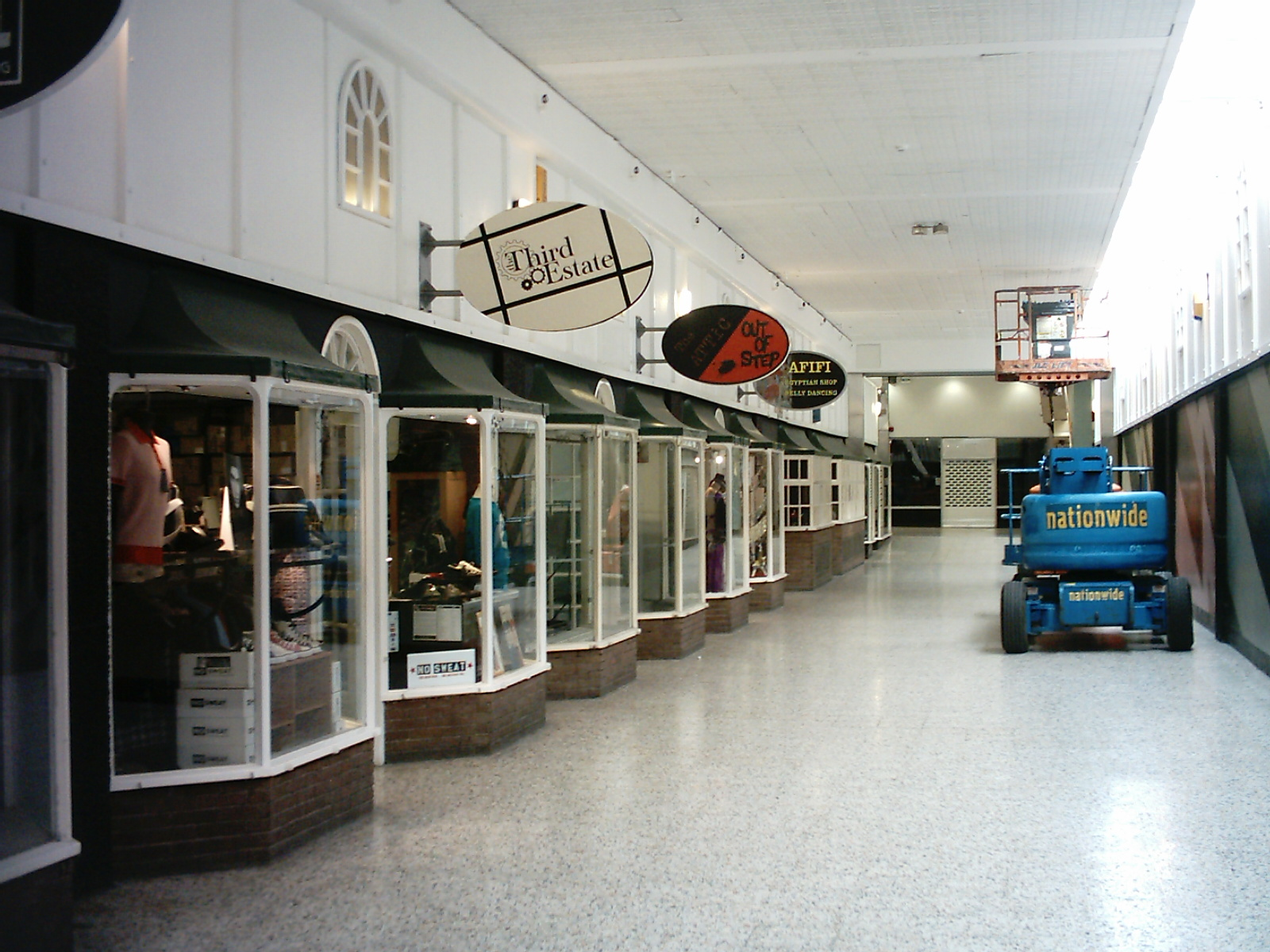
The former Georgian Arcade in the Merrion Centre was a dead mall

A mock-Georgian wing of the shopping centre was never fully occupied since the centre opened, and this wing was closed off in January 2016 to allow building work on the western end of the centre.

The Merrion Centre had a pedestrian subway which linked it to the Woodhouse Lane Car Park, Millennium Square and Leeds Beckett University. This was closed in 2000, and as of September 2017 the open air subway section has been filled in with compacted rubble as part of the centre redevelopment scheme.

The Fab Cafe, a cult TV and movie themed bar always popular with students, occupied a spot on Woodhouse Lane at the north-west corner of the Merrion Centre from 1998 to 2015. There was also a doorway leading to the open air subway junction.

In the 2010s the part of the building on the Eastern elevation known as the '50p' or the 'thrup'ny bit' due to its unique shape was demolished. Around the same time the 'Merrion Hotel' was acquired by chain 'Ibis' and rebranded with its name reflecting its proximity to the First Direct Arena.

Following the construction of Leeds Arena, the Merrion Centre was rezoned as part of the newly formed Arena Quarter of Leeds city centre.

== See also ==
- Architecture in Leeds
