= Mind Disease =

Single by Ritual
- B-side: "Nine"
- Released: October 6, 1982
- Genre: Post-punk, gothic rock
- Label: Red Flame Records
- Songwriter(s): Ritual
- Producer(s): Ritual

Ritual singles chronology
"Mind Disease" (1982)	"Kangaroo Court" (1983)

"Mind Disease" is a song written by the Harrow-based band Ritual. The song was released by Red Flame Records as a single in October 1982. It was produced by the band and engineered by Chris Stone.

== Picture sleeve ==
The front of the picture sleeve featured artwork by Simon Cohen, while the artwork on the back was done by Ritual guitarist Jamie Stewart.

== Formats and track listing ==
- 7": Red Flame / RF 712 (United Kingdom)
1. "Mind Disease"
2. "Nine"

== Personnel ==
- Errol Blyth - vocals
- Mark Bond - bass guitar
- Steve Pankhurst - saxophone
- Ray Mondo - drums
- Jamie Stewart - guitars
