= William V. Zinn =

British civil engineer

- Born: 1903
- Died: 1989 (aged 85–86)
- Education: University of London
- Occupation: Civil engineer
- Known for: The Global Philosophy (c.1971); Phenomena and Noumena (1984)

William Victor Zinn (1903–1989) was a British civil engineer who specialised in concrete construction methods. He served in the Royal Engineers in Burma during the Second World War and rose to the rank of Major. He worked for Truscon (the Trussed Concrete Steel Company Limited), and later formed his own practice and as William V. Zinn & Associates was the sole named consulting engineer on the construction of the Merrion Centre in Leeds.

He travelled in the Far East in the course of his work and became interested in Buddhist philosophy, writing two books on the subject, The Global Philosophy (c.1971) and Phenomena and Noumena (1984) in which he argued for the scientific nature of certain strands of Buddhism and the falsity of the mind-brain dichotomy.

== Early life and family ==
William Zinn was born in 1903. He studied engineering at the University of London and received the degree of Bachelor of Science (Eng.)

During the Second World War, he served in the Royal Engineers in Burma, rising to the rank of major.

== Career ==
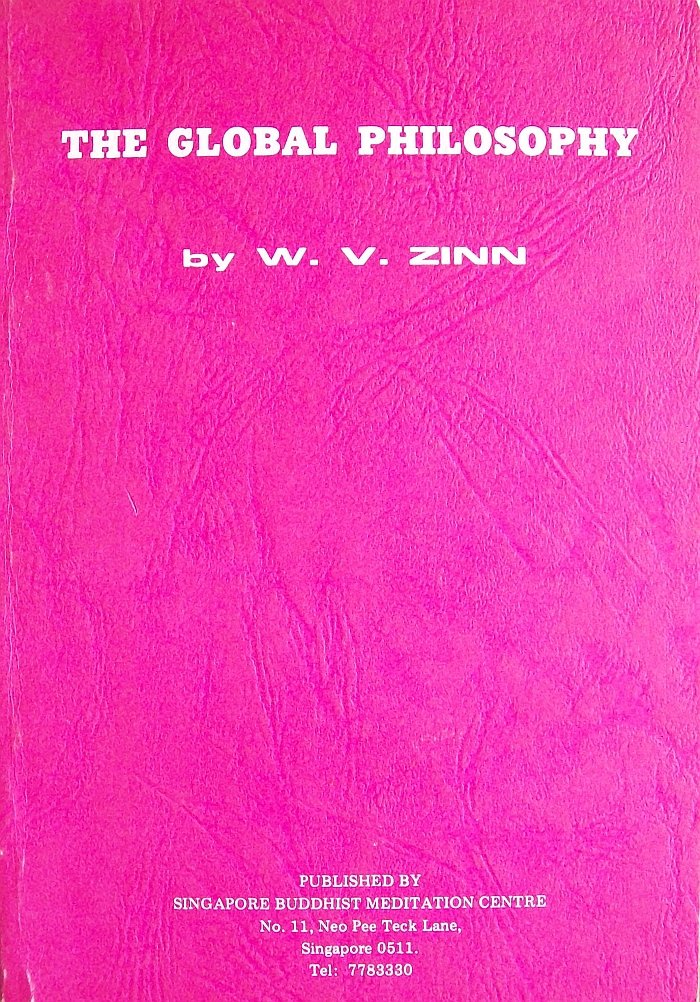
The Global Philosophy by William Zinn, c.1971.

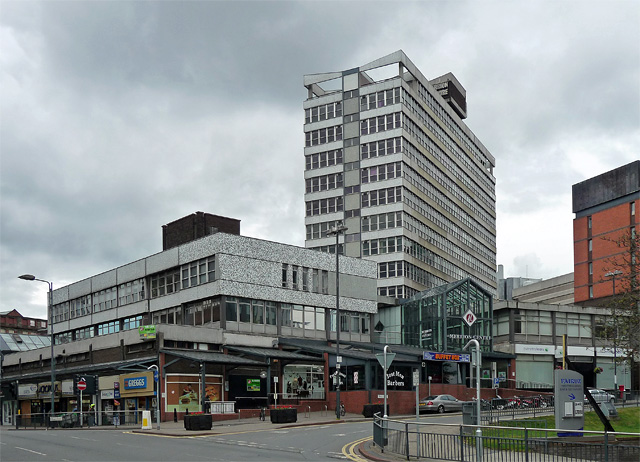
The Merrion Centre in 2011

Zinn practiced as a civil engineer and was qualified in Britain and France. He specialised in concrete engineering and was employed, among other places, at Truscon (the Trussed Concrete Steel Company Limited). He later formed his own practice and as William V. Zinn & Associates was the sole named consulting engineer on the construction of the Merrion Centre, Leeds, in the early 1960s. The centre was described by the builders Parkinsons as "the most advanced shopping and entertainment centre in the country" and cost £3m to build.

== Buddhism ==
Zinn travelled extensively in the Far East in the course of his work and became interested in Buddhist philosophy, publishing The Global Philosophy in 1971 which was reprinted by Vantage Press of New York in 1984 as a companion volume to his second book, Phenomena and Noumena, also published by Vantage that year with a foreword by Colin Blakemore, professor of physiology at the University of Oxford.

In the books, Zinn argued that the thought of the Gautama Buddha, preserved in the Theravada and taught in Sri Lanka, forms a complete and scientific philosophy, parts of which can be compared to Immanuel Kant's phenomena and noumenon. Zinn argues that the mind is a part of the body, subject to empirical analysis, and rejects the idea of a mystical or spiritual separation between the mind and the brain.

In an afterword to Phenomena and Noumena, Gerald du Pré, chairman of the Scientific Buddhism Association, summarises Zinn's arguments in favour of a "global philosophy" that would unite science and morality by rejecting mysticism, faith, and spirituality, thus preventing people living in a state of perpetual hypocrisy and confusion created by the conflict between science and faith. Du Pré felt that Zinn was perhaps too harsh in his criticism of the Mahayana school of Buddhism but not fundamentally wrong in his analysis that there was nothing in that school that was not in the Theravada.

== Later life ==
Zinn retired to the island of Jersey where he lived with his wife Monica. He died in 1989.

== Selected publications ==
- The Global Philosophy. Singapore Buddhist Meditation Centre, Singapore, c.1971. Reprinted, Vantage Press, New York, 1984.
- Phenomena and Noumena. Vantage Press, New York, 1984. ISBN 0533056403
