= Floorshow EP =

EP by The Sisters of Mercy
- Released: 1986
- Recorded: 1981
- Genre: Gothic rock, post-punk
- Length: 16:25
- Label: not on label, unofficial bootleg release
- Producer: Andrew Eldritch

Floorshow EP is a bootleg EP by The Sisters of Mercy, released on 7" vinyl in 1986. The tracks were taken from a demo tape recorded in 1981. "Floorshow", "Lights" and "Adrenochrome" were later rerecorded and released on singles. The Leonard Cohen cover, "Teachers", remained unreleased.

== Track listing ==
1. "Floorshow" (Eldritch/Adams/Marx) – 3:20
2. "Lights" (Eldritch) – 5:30
3. "Teachers/Adrenochrome" (Cohen/Eldritch) – 7:35

== Personnel ==
- Andrew Eldritch – vocals
- Gary Marx – guitars
- Craig Adams – bass guitar
- Doktor Avalanche (drum machine) – drums

== Artists commentary ==
- Andrew Eldritch (1982): "We made a tape once and took it down to Rough Trade. Geoff Travis gave it one listen, it was 18 minutes long, lotsa tracks, tapped his feet all the way through and turned round and said 'It's like Bauhaus!'"
- Gary Marx (1983): "Andy went to see The Furs a long time ago and gave them our first tape, which they liked and gave to various people, including their manager."
