= Delahunt =

Delahunt is an Irish family name sometimes spelt Delahunty. It is one of many forms of Ó Dulchaointigh.

It can refer to the following people:

- Bill Delahunt (1941–2024), member of the United States House of Representatives
- Brett Delahunt (born 1950), New Zealand pathologist
- Carrie Delahunt (born 1981), Canadian curler
- Garnet de la Hunt (1933–2014), South African scouting leader
- Jennie Delahunt (1877–1954), English artist and teacher
- Jim Delahunt (born 1962), Scottish sports presenter
- John Delahunt (born 1987), Canadian football player
- Meaghan Delahunt (born 1961), Australian novelist
- Nancy Delahunt (born 1959), Canadian curler
- Shane Delahunt (born 1994), Irish rugby union player
- Thomas James De la Hunt (1866–1933), American newspaper columnist, writer, and historian
- Walter Delahunt (born 1956), Canadian pianist

== Business ==
- De La Hunt Broadcasting, a radio broadcasting company in Minnesota

== Fiction ==
- Richard Delahunt, a character in the video games Hitman: Contracts and Hitman: Blood Money
- Timothy Delahunt, a character from the movie The Departed played by Mark Rolston
