= Delahunty =

Delahunty is a surname. Notable people with the surname include:

- Catherine Delahunty (born 1953), New Zealand politician
- George Delahunty (born 1952), physiologist and endocrinologist
- Hugh Delahunty (born 1949), Australian politician
- Jo Delahunty (born 1963), British barrister, judge, and legal academic
- Joseph Delahunty (died 2024), American politician
- Kieran Delahunty, Irish hurler
- Mary Delahunty (born 1951), Australian journalist and politician
- Mike Delahunty (born 1952), Australian rules footballer
- Robert Delahunty, American legal scholar
- Sarah Delahunty (born 1952), New Zealand writer
- Tom Delahunty (1935–2018), New Zealand association football referee

== See also ==
- Tom De La Hunty (born 1956), British bobsledder
- Delahunty v Player and Wills (Ireland) Ltd., Irish court case
