= Susan Price (linguist) =

English linguist (born 1956)

Susan Ann Price, CBE (born 1956 in South Shields) is a British academic, previously the Vice-Chancellor of Leeds Beckett University, Leeds, West Yorkshire, a position which she took up on 1 January 2010 following the resignation of Simon Lee in January 2009. Price was Acting Vice-Chancellor of the University of East London, to which office she was appointed in 2008 after having been Deputy Vice-Chancellor from 2007 and previously Pro Vice-Chancellor from 2002.

According to The Guardian newspaper, Susan Price is known as a "supporter of widening participation and newer universities."

Price graduated from the University of Salford with a first class degree (BSc) in Modern Languages, and also has a PhD in Linguistics from Salford and UCL and obtained the degree of MBA from the University of Bradford. She has held academic posts at Bradford and the University of the West of England. She is a Fellow of the Chartered Institute of Linguists. According to Leeds Beckett University website, Professor Price speaks six European Languages including French, Spanish and Romanian. In December 2011 it was revealed that Price had earned a listing in the latest edition of Who's Who.

She was appointed Commander of the Order of the British Empire (CBE) in the 2016 New Year Honours for services to higher education.
