= Leeds Beckett University =

University in West Yorkshire, England

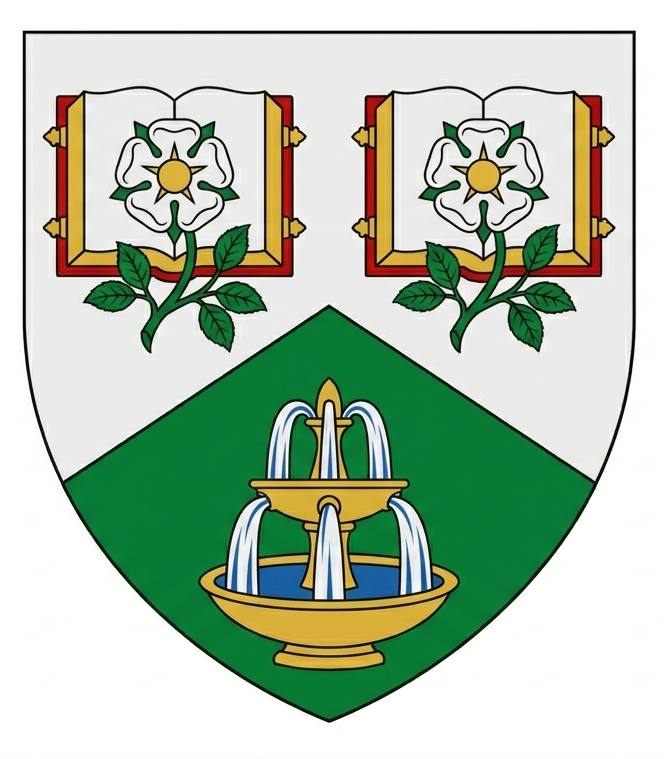
- Former names: Leeds Metropolitan University; Leeds Polytechnic
- Motto: Latin: Victrix Fortunae Sapientia
- Motto in English: Wisdom is the conqueror of fortune
- Type: Public
- Established: 1992 – university status 1970 – Leeds Polytechnic
- Affiliations: Coalition of Urban and Metropolitan Universities; Universities UK; University Alliance
- Budget: £260 million (2023–24)
- Chancellor: Sir Bob Murray
- Vice-Chancellor: Peter Slee
- Administrative staff: 3,601
- Students: 22,290 (2024/25)
- Undergraduates: 16,295 (2024/25)
- Postgraduates: 5,995 (2024/25)
- Location: Leeds, England; 53.804167°N 1.549444°W
- Campus: Urban
- Colours: Purple
- Website: leedsbeckett.ac.uk

Leeds Beckett University (LBU), formerly known as Leeds Metropolitan University (LMU) and before that as Leeds Polytechnic, is a public university in Leeds, West Yorkshire, England. It has campuses in the city centre and Headingley. The university's origins can be traced to 1824, with the foundation of the Leeds Mechanics Institute. Leeds Polytechnic was formed in 1970, and was part of the Leeds Local Education Authority until it became an independent Higher Education Corporation on 1 April 1989. In 1992, the institution gained university status. The current name was adopted in September 2014.

== History ==
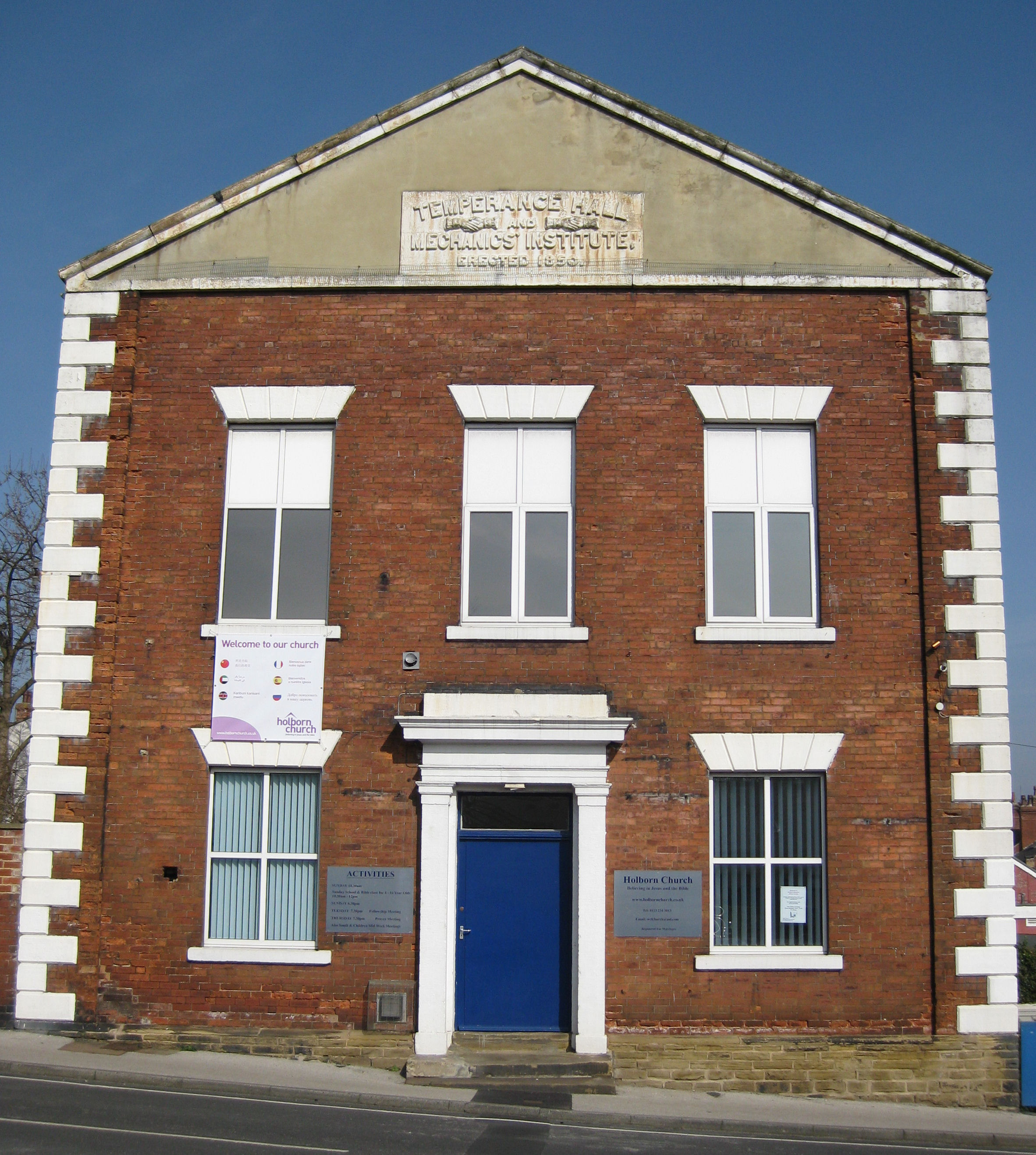
Leeds Mechanics' Institute building, Woodhouse

Logos used by Leeds Polytechnic in the 1980s and Leeds Metropolitan University in the 1990s and early 2000s

The university traces its roots to 1824 when the Leeds Mechanics Institute was founded. The institute later became the Leeds Institute of Science, Art and Literature and in 1927 was renamed Leeds College of Technology. In 1970, the college merged with Leeds College of Commerce (founded 1845), part of Leeds College of Art (f. 1846) and Yorkshire College of Education and Home Economics (f. 1874), forming Leeds Polytechnic. In 1976, James Graham College and the City of Leeds College of Education (f. 1907 as part of City of Leeds Training College) joined Leeds Polytechnic. In 1987, the Polytechnic became one of the founding members of the Northern Consortium.

=== Name change ===
After plans to change the name to Leeds Carnegie were abandoned, in 2013 it was announced that the Board of Governors had applied to the Privy Council to change the name to Leeds Beckett University, after one of the university's founding colleges, Beckett Park, which in turn was named after Ernest Beckett, 2nd Baron Grimthorpe. The proposed change resulted in a backlash among students. The Privy Council approved Leeds Metropolitan University's application to change its name to Leeds Beckett University in November 2013. The name change took place in September 2014.

=== Coat of arms and crest ===
Leeds Beckett University was granted its arms on 11 January 1994 under warrant authorised by Sir Conrad Marshall John Fisher Swan, Garter Principal King of Arms (1992–1995). Symbolism found within the coat of arms:

- Green colour – conservation
- Owl – Leeds and wisdom
- Yorkshire rose – County symbol
- Open books – learning
- Chevron – represents a place of protection
- Fountain – knowledge

== Campuses ==
=== City Campus ===
This comprises a number of locations on the northern side of Leeds city centre, largely between the Inner Ring Road and the University of Leeds campus. In addition to the former Polytechnic site, several other buildings have recently been acquired. These include: Old Broadcasting House, the former home of the BBC in Leeds; Electric Press, a building on Millennium Square; and Old School Board, the birthplace of school education in Leeds. The latest additions for the 2008/09-year were the Rose Bowl, the new home of the Leeds Business School, opposite the Civic Hall and designed to reflect the facade of the Civic Hall, and the Broadcasting Place complex, including Broadcasting Tower, a new set of buildings which fits in with the red stone brick buildings famous in Leeds and which provides teaching space for the Faculty of Arts, Environment and Technology, the Faculty of Art, Architecture and Design, and the School of Cultural Studies and Humanities, as well as student accommodation. Three buildings on the site have been disposed of since becoming a university, the Brunswick building was sold and in 2008 demolished; it is now the site of the Leeds Arena. A further tower block has been sold and is now a Premier Inn. More recently, Cloth Hall Court has also been disposed of and sold to their neighbour, The University of Leeds. The remaining largely 1960s buildings of the former polytechnic were reclad in the early 2010s.

New high-rise student accommodation has been built around the City Campus and includes Opal Tower and the Sky Plaza. These are now the tallest buildings in the Northern half of the city centre.

=== Headingley Campus ===
A 100-acre (40-hectare) campus sited in Beckett Park, Headingley, the campus is connected to the city centre by Headingley railway station which is a short walk from the campus. Bus routes on Otley Road and Kirkstall Lane are also close by.

Beckett Park Campus

==== James Graham Building ====
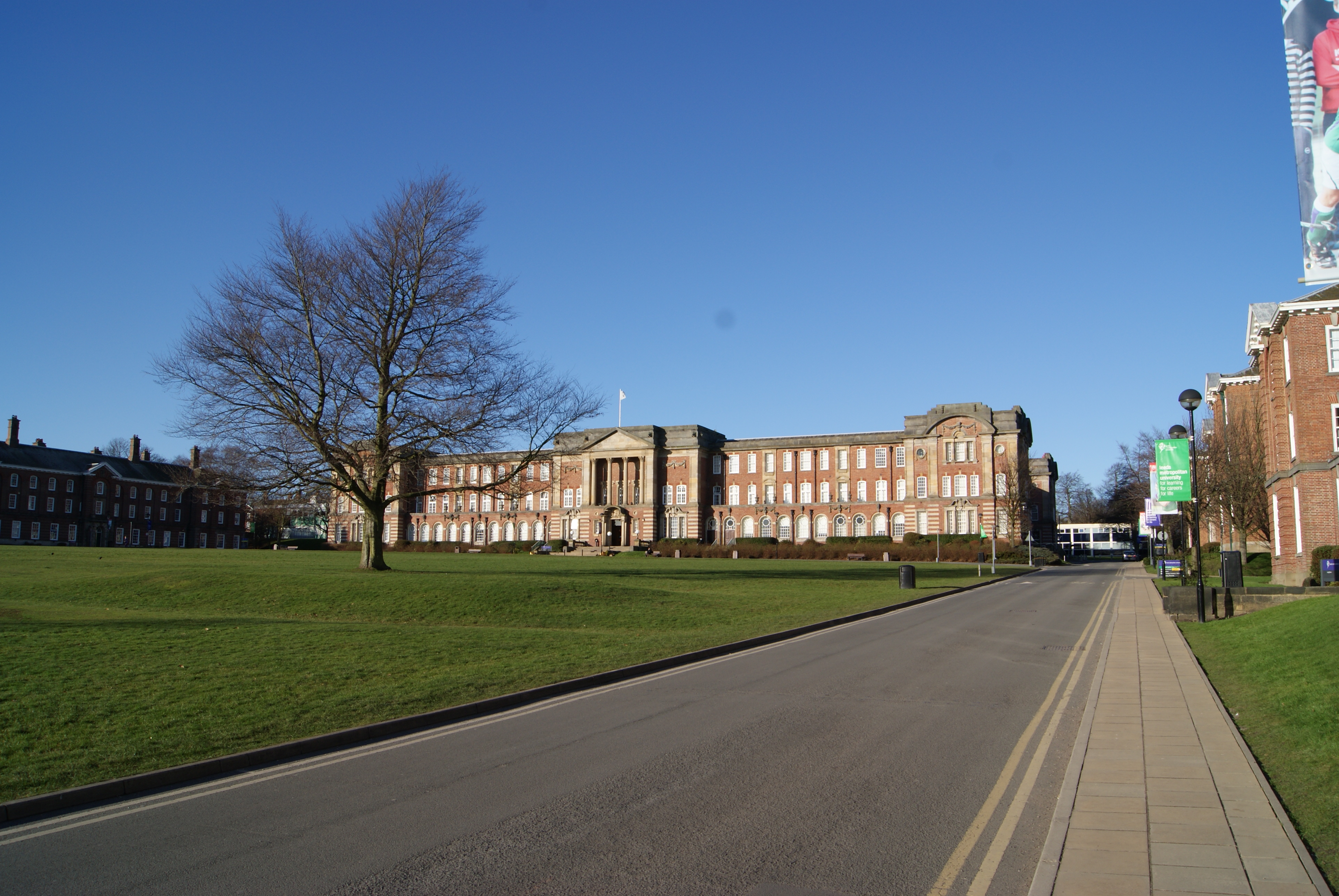
The James Graham building seen across The Acre on the Beckett Park campus.

The main building was constructed in 1912 as the Education Block for the City of Leeds Training College and is a Grade II Listed Building of red brick, gritstone ashlar dressings, slate and a lead roof. It is of classical Neo-Georgian style by G. W. Atkinson, the winner of an architectural competition. The main entrance is reached by a flight of stairs to a recessed portico framed by 4 Corinthian pillars and a pediment above, and the building as a whole was constructed around two internal quadrangles. However, these have now been filled in to create large lecture theatres. During the WW I and WW II it was used as a military hospital. It is now named after James Graham, Secretary of Education of the City of Leeds, who was a major instigator of the Training College, and greatly involved in the planning (some at his own expense) and supervision of the project. He also named all of the Halls, apart from Priestley, which was chosen by a committee.

==== The Halls ====
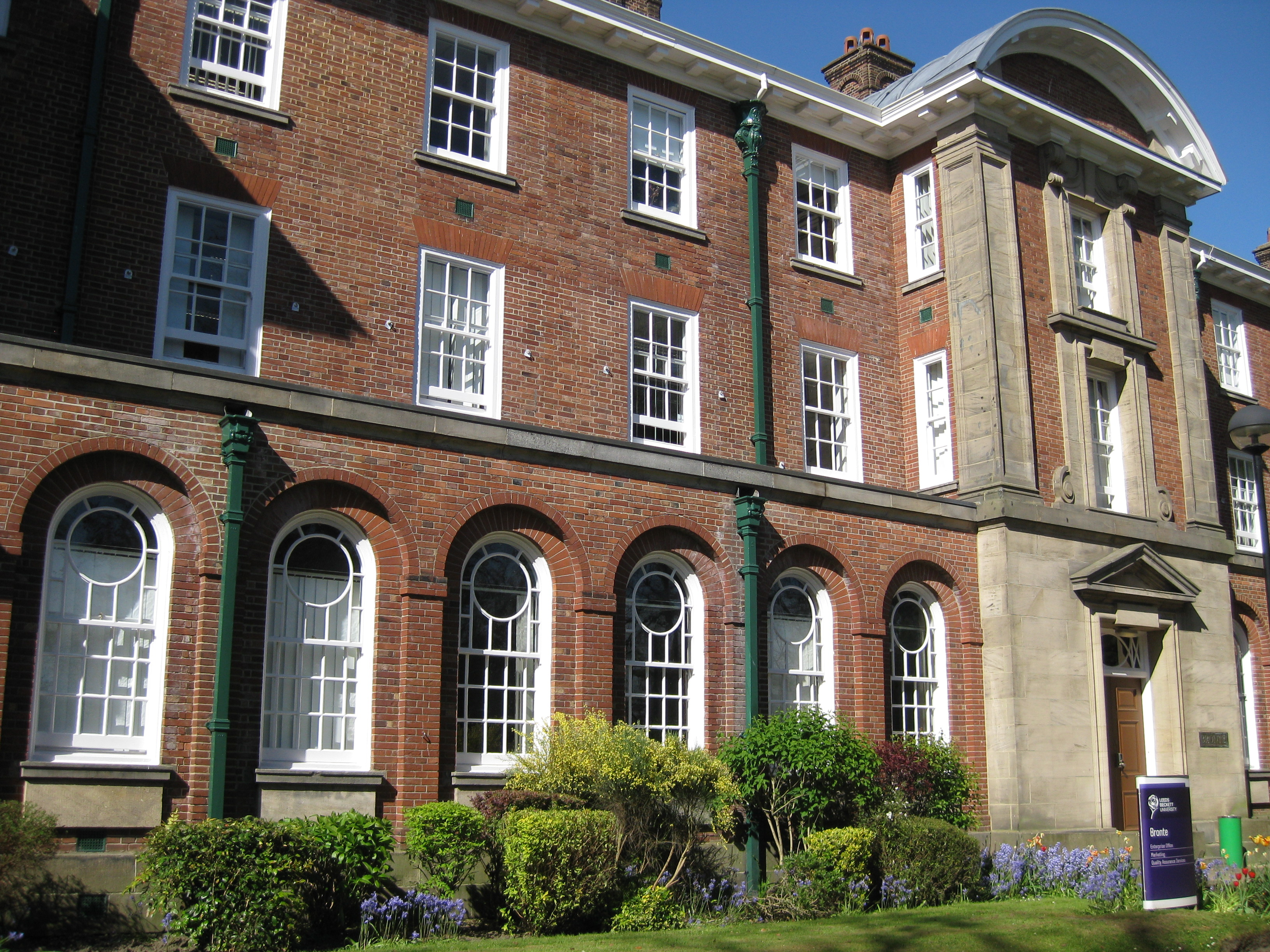
Bronte Hall

The James Graham Building stands in front of a large lawn called the Acre. On the two sides are buildings of the same date and materials, which were originally halls of residence for the college students but are now teaching facilities. These are also Grade II Listed buildings. Bronte Hall was designed by G. W. Atkinson. The others were designed by the runners up in the architecture competition, using Bronte as a template but allowing individual touches. The five halls on the East were for women, the two halls on the West were for men (women being more numerous as teachers). During the period that the campus served as a hospital, Macaulay Hall hosted the morgue.

==== The Grange ====
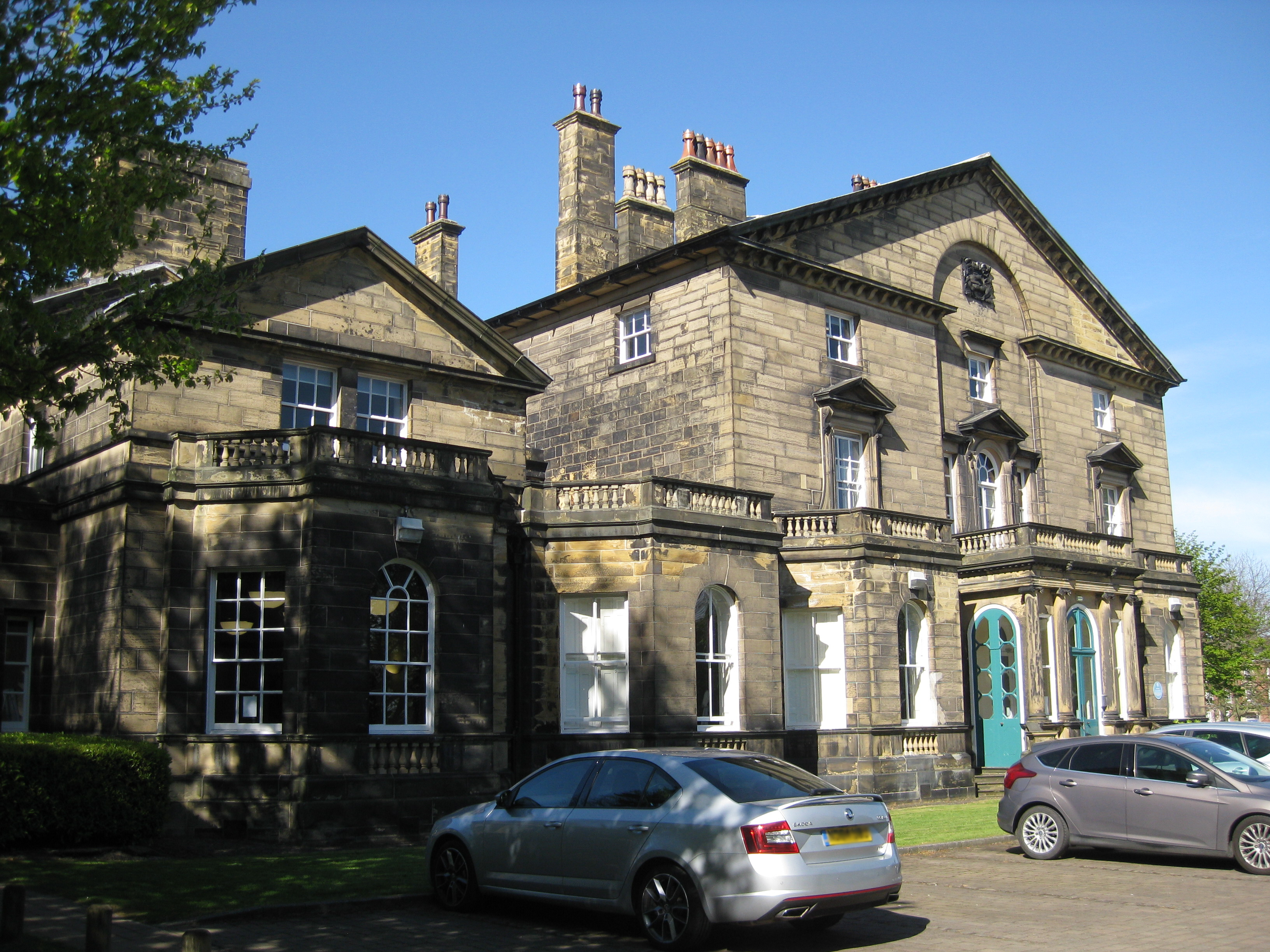
The Grange

This is a Grade II* listed building of ashlar gritstone with blue slate roofs and a lead-covered dome. The earliest portions date from 1752, but there were major alterations in about 1834 and 1858 by the Beckett family, who ultimately sold it and the surrounding estate to Leeds Corporation to build the college and make a public park. It was used by the college as a hall of residence for men, but the university converted it into IT offices and service areas.

Headingley Campus has been repeatedly claimed to be haunted, with staff working late or alone claiming to have seen doors open and close by themselves or hearing conversations from empty rooms. The University occasionally hosts ghost tours.

=== Carnegie Campus ===
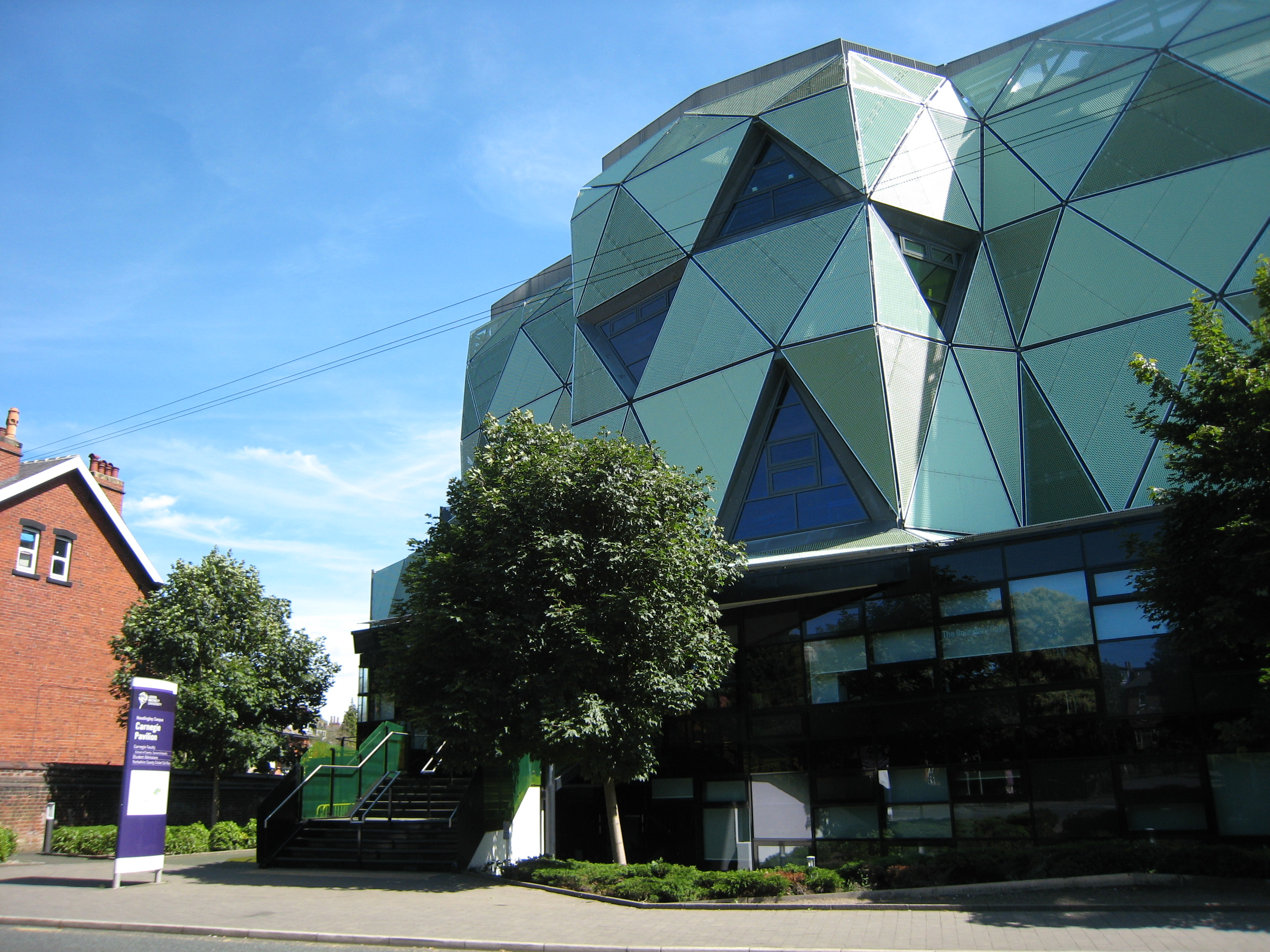
Carnegie Pavilion

In 2006, the campus extended beyond the confines of Beckett Park to include the Carnegie Stand at the Headingley Stadium. This dual-purpose stand accommodates more than 4,500 spectators, and also provides teaching rooms and a hall. After bulldozing R. W. Rich Hall, a student hall of residence built in the 1960s, the Carnegie Village, was opened in August 2009, providing on-campus accommodation for 479 students.

=== Accommodation ===
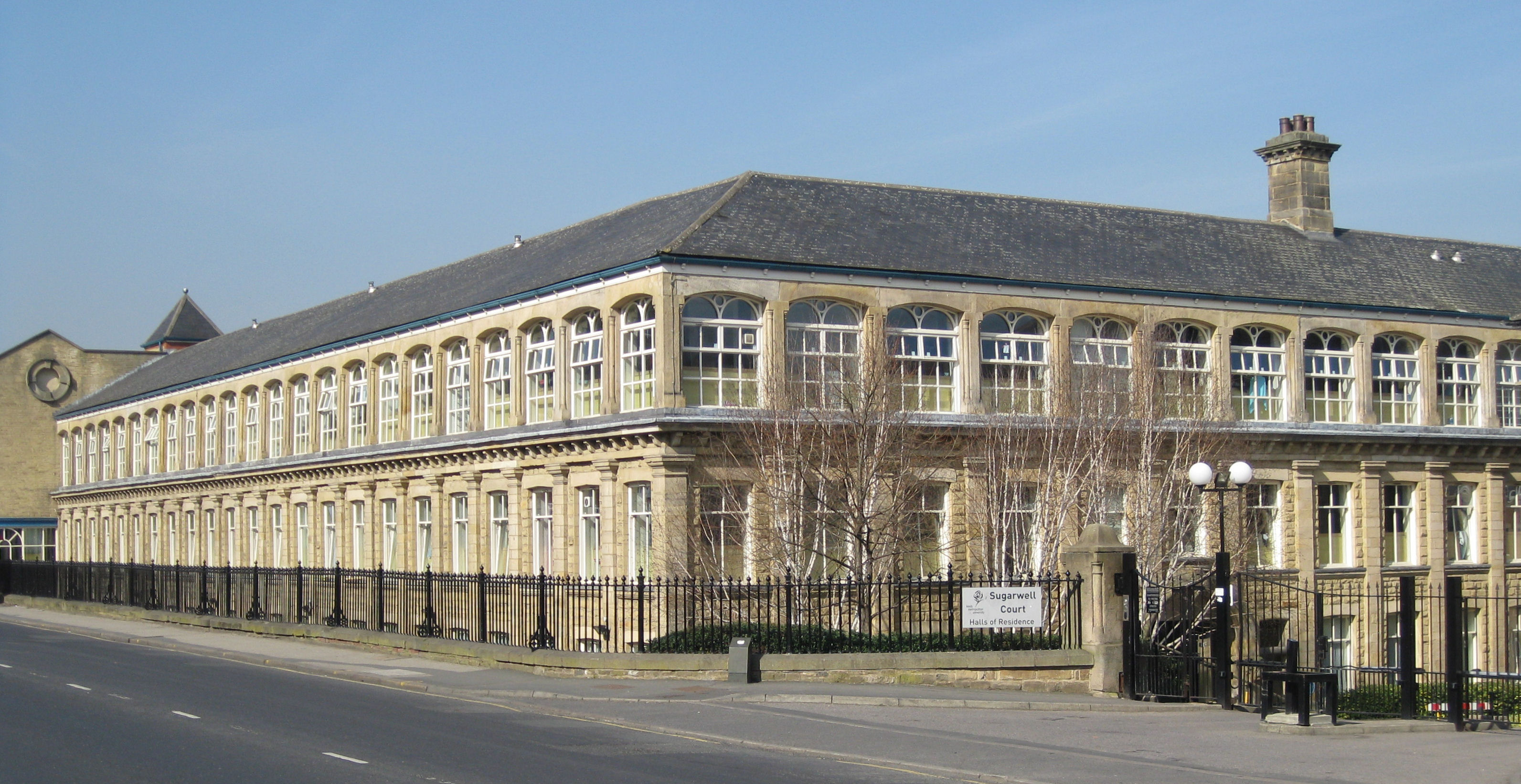
Sugarwell Court residences in Meanwood

The university provides 4,500 bedrooms in a variety of locations and all first year undergraduates are guaranteed a place in university accommodation, so long as Leeds Beckett University is the student's first choice university.

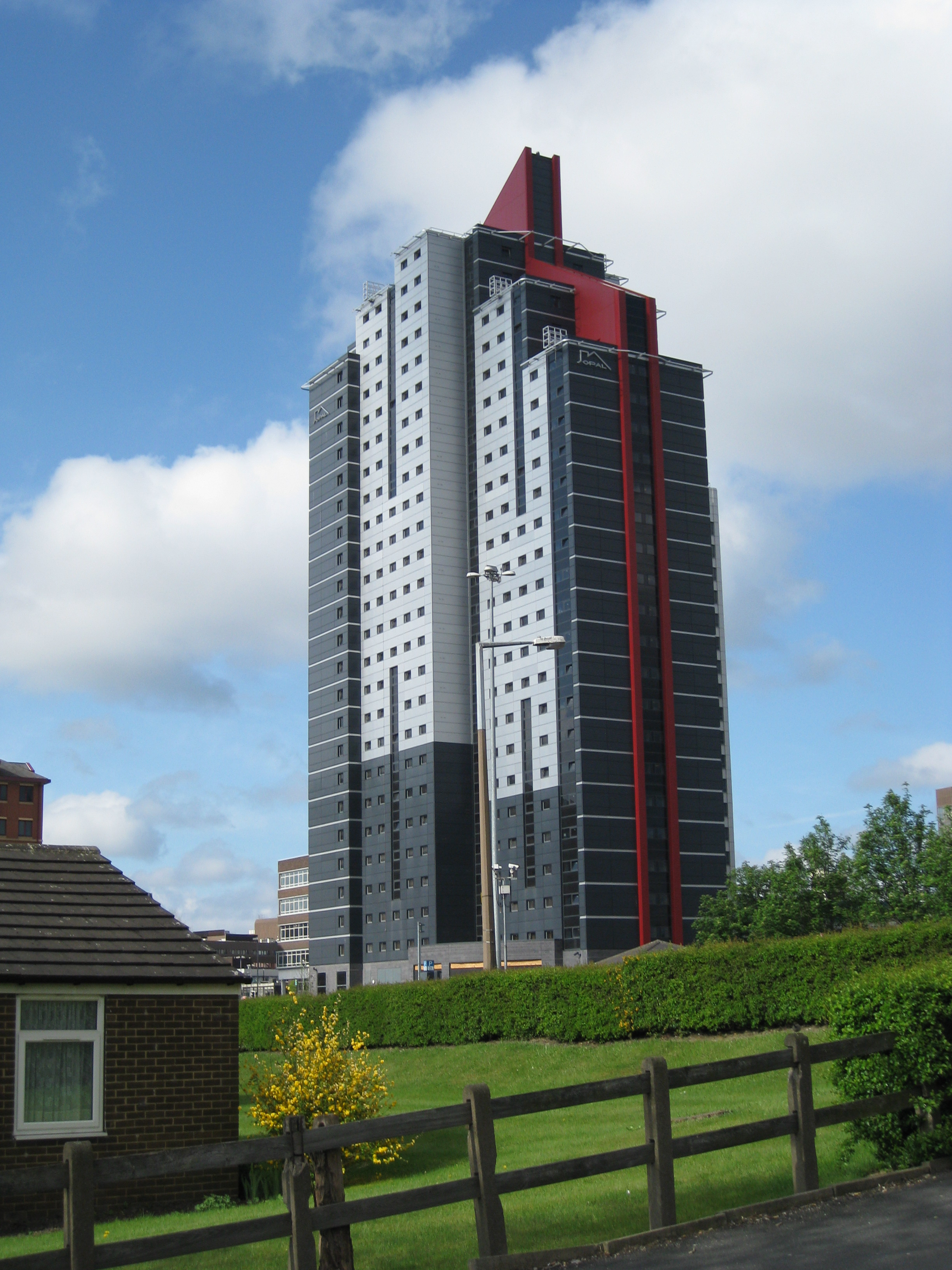
Opal 3 student residences in Leeds city centre are shared with the University of Leeds

Carnegie Village was newly built in September 2010 and provides Passivhaus standard townhouses and apartments at Headingley Campus. The largest hall is Kirkstall Brewery on Broad Lane which has places for over 1,000 students and is about 2 miles (3 kilometres) from the Headingley campus. As its name suggests, it is a former brewery property, but is mostly modern blocks. The second largest is Sugarwell Court, in Meanwood, which is about 1.5 mi (2.4 km) from the City campus, and accommodates 388 students. This is also a converted industrial site.

Two of the most popular accommodation buildings are next to each other in Burley near The Leeds Studios and 0.8 mi (1.3 km) from City Campus. Formerly owned by Opal Property Group and now owned by Greystar Real Estate Partners, they are Marsden House (previously Opal 1) and Leeds Student Village (previously Opal 2).

Accommodation types not owned by the university vary. Across North Leeds there are many sites which are primarily low-rise buildings, often converted from a former industrial use. The growing number of sites around the city centre has led to the building of new highrise complexes, these include CLV Leeds (previously Opal 3), The Skyplaza and Broadcasting Tower.

== Student life ==
Leeds Beckett Students' Union is the representative body for students and was affiliated to the National Union of Students until a student referendum in 2026, where students voted to disaffiliate from the union with a nearly 70% majority. In 2012, it was voted the second best Students' Union in the city of Leeds and 39th nationally. In 2016 it was voted 6th best SU in the country. The union on the City Campus has a Student Advice Service and a bar The Hive which contains two live music venues called The Stage and Stage 2. The Headingley campus also has its own bar called The Hive.

The Athletic Union is separate to the Students' Union but maintains historically close links and holds three seats on the Student Council. Leeds Beckett regularly features well in the fixtures of university sports in the UK. Varsity fixtures between Leeds Beckett and Leeds University prove to be highly popular and competitive each year.

According to the 2027 Uni Compare rankings, based on verified ratings from students, the University is ranked 6th in the UK overall, 9th for course quality, 8th for employability and 7th for student life.

== Organisation and governance ==
Peter Slee joined the university as Vice-Chancellor in September 2015, succeeding Susan Price, who had been in post since January 2010.

The current Deputy Vice-Chancellors are Clare de Arostegui (Resources) and Phil Cardew (Academic). The University has two Pro Vice-Chancellors, Silke Machold (Research & Innovation) and Chris Prince (Employer Partnerships & Student Futures).

=== Schools ===
The eight schools of the university are:

- Carnegie School of Sport
- Carnegie School of Education
- Leeds Business School
- Leeds Law School
- Leeds School of Arts
- School of Built Environment, Engineering & Computing
- School of Health
- School of Humanities and Social Sciences

==== Law ====
Leeds Law School offers undergraduate, postgraduate and professional law courses, as well as having a Law Research Unit. Postgraduate law courses include the Legal Practice Course (LPC) and the conversion course, the Graduate Diploma in Law. Undergraduate courses include the LLB (Hons) Law. The Dean of Leeds Law School is Deveral Capps, who joined Leeds Beckett in February 2015.

Leeds Law School is based at Portland, in the Leeds city centre. Facilities include a Mock Courtroom, a Hydra Foundation Suite, study spaces and a Postgraduate Resource Room.

== Academic profile ==
=== Reputation and rankings ===
Rankings
National rankings
- Complete (2027): 86
- Guardian (2027): 97
- Times / Sunday Times (2027): 73

Global rankings
- QS (2027): 1001–1200
- THE (2026): 801–1000

In November 2006, the university won the award for "outstanding contribution to the local community" at the annual higher education awards ceremony hosted by The Times Higher Education Supplement. It also came second in the main category, "the university of the Year", which was won by the University of Nottingham. In this category, the university was highly commended for its "low-charging, high impact" strategy.

In June 2007, the university was recognised for its environmentally friendly attitude by being ranked number one in the UK in the Green League 2007: a ranking of sustainability in the higher education sector, compiled by People & Planet.

In June 2013, Leeds Beckett University became only the third university in the UK to achieve the Customer Service Excellence standard, a Government benchmark awarded to public sector bodies who demonstrate a commitment to driving customer-focused change within their organisation.

In 2013, the university obtained the Gold Investors in People standard, one of only a handful of higher education institutions to do so.

=== Repository ===
In common with many institutions in the UK, and globally, the university maintains an open access repository that comprises an open access research archive and an OER repository: A store of open educational resources produced at Leeds Beckett that are freely available for reuse under a Creative Commons (Attribution-NonCommercial-ShareAlike 2.0 UK: England & Wales) licence.

== Partnerships ==
The university has established a number of sporting and cultural partnerships, both in the UK and overseas.

=== Sporting ===
- Leeds Rugby — Leeds Rhinos and Leeds Carnegie
- Yorkshire County Cricket Club
- In January 2007, the university became the primary sponsor for Rugby Football League's main knock-out cup competition, the Challenge Cup. This was the first partnership of this kind between the governing body of a sport in England and a university
- In May of the same year, the university purchased a 51% stake in the Leeds Tykes rugby union club. The name of the club was changed to Leeds Carnegie to fit with Carnegie College The university subsequently divested itself of that stake
- Carnegie have also sponsored the last three Rugby League World Club Challenge matches. This is an annual match between the domestic champions of the Super League and the Australasian NRL. Incidentally all three of the matches sponsored by Carnegie have been won by the European team.
- Leeds Carnegie was a brand name used by several sports teams associated with the Carnegie School of Physical Education, now part of Leeds Beckett University.

=== Cultural ===
- Royal Armouries
- West Yorkshire Playhouse

=== Historic Issues ===
Simon Lee embarked on a programme of partnerships with external bodies during his time as vice-chancellor, which were dubbed as "rubbing shoulders" after the university took a majority stake in the Leeds Tykes rugby club, renaming it Leeds Carnegie. It was subsequently revealed that the club signed Waisale Serevi after he had been paid for other work at the university. The university sold its stake in April 2009.

The university spent large sums on other partnerships, including £423,000 to the Northern Ballet Theatre and £283,000 on the Irish Football Association.

In April 2014, the Quality Assurance Agency confirmed the quality and standards of provision at Leeds Beckett University. In October 2009, the Quality Assurance Agency gave the university a "limited confidence" rating, due to concerns over maintenance of academic standards. In 2009 Simon Lee resigned following a series of controversies over the university's fees strategy, allegations of bullying and foreign travel for his wife paid for by the university. The chancellor, Brendan Foster, also resigned less than a month later. The controversies that led to these resignations formed part of the edition of 29 July 2010 of the BBC Radio 4 documentary "Face the Facts".

== Notable people ==
=== List of chancellors ===
- Leslie Silver (1999–2005)
- Brendan Foster (2005–2009)
- Sir Bob Murray (2012–)

=== List of vice-chancellors ===
- Christopher Price (1986–1994) Director of Leeds Polytechnic 1986–1992
- Leslie Wagner (1994–2003)
- Simon Lee (2003–2009)
- Geoff Hitchins (2009–2009) chief executive and acting vice-chancellor
- Susan Price (2010–2015)
- Peter Slee (2015–present)

=== Notable alumni ===
Politics
- Colin Burgon – politician
- Kim Leadbeater – politician
- Andy McDonald – politician
- Eric Pickles – politician
- Phil Willis – politician
- Pholile Shakantu – Eswatini politician

Arts & Entertainment

- Marc Almond – singer-songwriter and musician
- David Ball – musician
- Peter Cattaneo – filmmaker
- Rose English – Artist
- Green Gartside – musician
- Kim-Joy Hewlett, baker and cookbook writer
- Carol McNicoll – potter
- Stereo Mike – hip-hop artist
- Stass Paraskos – artist
- Sophie Parkin – writer, artist, poet
- Alexander Skarsgård – actor
- Frank Tovey – musician
- Andrew White – guitarist of Kaiser Chiefs
- Ricky Wilson – singer of Kaiser Chiefs

Sport

- Alistair Brownlee – triathlete
- Emily Campbell – weightlifter
- Austin Healey – rugby union player
- Keely Hodgkinson – athlete
- Lucy Bronze – footballer
- Paul Heckingbottom – football player and manager
- Stuart Lancaster – rugby union – England head coach
- Jon-Paul Pittman – footballer
- Sam Quek – Team GB hockey player
- Georgia Taylor-Brown – Team GB triathlete
- Kevin Sinfield – Rugby league footballer
- David Stone – para-cyclist
- Ben Thaler – Rugby league referee
- Alex Yee – Team GB triathlete

Business

- Simon Gray – businessman
- Richard Howson – chief executive Carillion
- John Poulson – architectural designer

Journalism

- Christian Fraser – BBC journalist

Other

- Mohammad Sidique Khan, terrorist who led the 7 July 2005 London bombings
- Theresa Mkandawire, first woman prof of civil engineering in Malawi

== See also ==
- Armorial of UK universities
- Listed buildings in Leeds (Weetwood Ward)
- List of universities in the UK
- Murder of Somaiya Begum
- Post-1992 universities
