= Deaths of Christianne and Robert Shepherd =

International incident

Christianne and Robert Shepherd (known as Christi and Bobby, respectively) were an English sister and brother from Horbury, West Yorkshire who died of carbon monoxide poisoning while on holiday in Corfu in October 2006. At the time of their deaths, Christi was seven years old and Bobby was six.

The cause of death was found to be a faulty gas boiler. Three people, including the manager of the hotel where they were staying, were found guilty of manslaughter by negligence following a criminal trial in Greece in 2010 and were each sentenced to seven years in prison. The jury at the inquest into Christi and Bobby's deaths, which was held at Wakefield Coroner's Court in 2015, returned a verdict of unlawful killing and concluded that travel group Thomas Cook had "breached its duty of care".

== Deaths ==
In October 2006, Christi and Bobby Shepherd went on a one-week half-term holiday to the resort of Gouvia on the Greek island of Corfu with their father, Neil Shepherd, and his girlfriend Ruth Beatson. After an initial problem in which the family was allocated a room in the main building of the Louis Corcyra Beach Hotel, they were admitted to a semi-detached two-bedroom bungalow in the hotel's grounds.

Forty-eight hours after arriving, Beatson and the children started to feel unwell, with Bobby stumbling and appearing dizzy. Christi became ill shortly after going to bed on 25 October and her father went to fetch a carrier bag for her to vomit into but he collapsed. At approximately 11 am the following day, a chambermaid found the adults both unconscious and the two children dead. Both adults only discovered the news of the deaths when they regained consciousness in hospital some days later.

== Investigation ==
A police investigation by West Yorkshire Police found that the holiday representative responsible for health and safety at the hotel had not received any specific training relating to it. The cause of death was identified as carbon monoxide poisoning caused by fumes which had seeped into the accommodation from a "decrepit" boiler situated in an outhouse directly adjacent to Bobby and Christi's bedroom.

Neil Shepherd and his girlfriend Ruth Beatson, together with the children's mother Sharon Wood and her husband Paul, campaigned in Corfu to secure a local police investigation and trial. The BBC's Samantha Haines later reported in 2010: "Their actions made them both well-known and not always popular with the locals […] BBC reporter Jenny Hill said the Corfu economy relied heavily on tourism and the publicity surrounding the case was 'unwelcome' on the island. But the family vowed to go back to Corfu again and again, until they could leave with what they said was 'justice' for the children."

== 2010 Greek trial ==
In February 2010, the trial of two Thomas Cook employees and ten Greek nationals began at Corfu Town courthouse. All of the defendants faced charges of manslaughter by negligence; one was later discharged. The three trial judges heard evidence from Harry Rogers, a mechanical engineer, who said the installation of the 'decrepit' boiler responsible for the deaths was the worst he had seen in 50 years. He told the court that the leak had been caused by a wired-out gas valve, a bypassed thermostat, the lack of a flue and chimney, and a gap between the bungalow and the outhouse containing the boiler. Comparing it to a loaded gun, he said: "You can play with a gun for so long and it may not go off, but in certain circumstances someone will get killed".

During the trial, the hotel staff, maintenance engineers and builders denied responsibility for the deaths, blaming each other through their lawyers.

The trial concluded in May 2010, with three of the defendants found guilty. They included the hotel's manager, Georgios Chrysikopoulos, the head of its technical department, Petros Stoyiannos, and its electrician, Christos Louvros. All three were sentenced to seven years' imprisonment. A further defendant, Dimitrios Xidias, was sentenced to two years' probation for breaching building regulations. However, in May 2015 it was reported that due to the Greek appeals process none had yet gone to prison.

The remaining defendants, including both Thomas Cook travel representatives, were cleared; the travel company was also cleared of any responsibility for the deaths of the children.

== 2015 inquest ==
=== Legal aid ===
Following the conclusion of the Greek trial, the parents of Christi and Bobby were refused legal aid from England and Wales to pay for their representation at the inquest into the deaths, on the grounds that lawyers are not usually required. In March 2014, the issue was raised by Labour MP Mary Creagh during Prime Minister's Questions in the House of Commons. The following month Shepherd and Wood met British Prime Minister David Cameron, the legal aid minister Shailesh Vara and Creagh, who had organised the meeting. In a statement afterwards, Vara said: "This is a very tragic case in which two young children lost their lives and my deepest sympathies are with the family, with whom the prime minister and I recently met. Questions remain unanswered and I have therefore authorised legal aid for representation at the inquest to hopefully provide much-needed answers."

Shepherd welcomed the news, saying: "We are now in a position to be able to concentrate on getting the full facts of Christi and Bobby's deaths out in the public without the added worry of cost." Wood said there was "an overwhelming public interest for the lessons of our tragedy to be learned so that no other family suffers as we have".

=== Coroner's inquest hearing ===
More than eight years after the children's deaths, a full inquest into the events surrounding them began at Wakefield Coroner's Court on 26 April 2015. Opening the inquest, West Yorkshire Coroner David Hinchliff said: "The family of these children have waited a long, long time for this day to come". It heard that the bungalow "became available for this family to use because the previous occupants had become unwell and they had been detained in hospital for tests and treatment". Heating engineer Harry Rogers told the inquest that the faulty boiler responsible for the children's deaths would have been shut down immediately if it had been inspected in the UK. Rogers told the jury that the most significant of its many failings was the lack of a flue to vent the fumes from the boiler room. He added that he had been told that this same defect applied to many of the other boilers at the hotel but that he had not been allowed to inspect them.

When Rogers said that he had been told that Thomas Cook's position was that the hotel had told the tour company they had no gas appliances for the purposes of heating or water, the barrister acting for Thomas Cook, Nicholas Purnell QC, clarified to the jury that it was his client's position that it had been lied to. Asked by Leslie Thomas QC, the barrister acting for the children's family, whether it reasonable for Thomas Cook to accept such an assurance from the hotel without questioning it, Rogers replied: "They've got a duty of care. If it's not gas, how is it being heated?"

A second expert, Thomas Magner, described the installation work as having been "botched and bodged" and said that a safety cut-off device had been deliberately short-circuited to prevent it turning off. The short-circuiting appeared to have been carried out the day before the children died, in response to a complaint from another family about a lack of hot water in their bungalow.

At the inquest, a series of former and current Thomas Cook employees declined to answer questions about the events around the children's deaths. Manny Fontenla-Novoa, who was chief executive of the company's UK and Ireland operations at the time of the accident and subsequently chief executive of the Thomas Cook Group, was told by the coroner that he did not have to answer any questions that might incriminate him. When it was put to him by the barrister acting for the family, that "Thomas Cook put profit before safety" Fontenla-Novoa replied "I decline to answer"; he gave the same response to almost all of the questions he was asked.

Thomas Cook's former director of government and external affairs and director-general of the Federation of Tour Operators, Andy Cooper, told the inquest, "I don't believe the duty of care of the tour operator is that they should be carrying out a full safety check", and described the checks conducted as "a basic audit". The company's head of health and safety, Peter Welsh, told the inquest that he understood that the hotel's management had told Thomas Cook there were no gas-powered heaters on the site.

Asked by the family's barrister: "My clients would like me to put it to you this is an inquest into the deaths of two young children. This is an opportunity to assist. Would you like to take that opportunity?" travel representative Nicola Jordison replied: "I decline to answer". She also declined to acknowledge that a statement she had made during the Greek trial was in fact hers. Jordison's husband David, also a Thomas Cook holiday representative, also declined to answer when the family's barrister asked him: "You knew there was gas there, because you had been there for a whole season, didn't you?" The company's health and safety manager, Clare Kenny, also declined to answer questions put to her.

The current Thomas Cook Group's chief executive officer Peter Fankhauser, told the inquest: "I feel incredibly sorry for the family—incredibly sorry. But I don't have to apologise". He went on to explain, "I feel so thoroughly, from the deepest of my heart, sorry, but there's no need to apologise because there was no wrongdoing by Thomas Cook". He said his company had a policy of avoiding gas-fired hot water appliances but that it had been lied to by the hotel, which had said that it had no gas supply.

On 13 May 2015, the inquest jury returned a verdict of unlawful killing. The jury also found that Thomas Cook had "breached its duty of care". Coroner David Hinchliff said that he would be making recommendations to the holiday industry.

=== Aftermath ===
Speaking after the inquest verdict, Christi and Bobby's mother said that she continued to blame Thomas Cook for the accident, saying: "It's clear Thomas Cook should and could have identified that lethal boiler. There will never be true justice for the deaths of my two innocent children. [The verdict] has brought this tragedy to a respectful end. Rest in peace our beautiful angels." However, the company issued a statement in which it insisted that although it was "shocked and deeply saddened by the tragic loss", it was not at fault, citing the acquittal of its employees in the 2010 Greek trial.

BBC North of England Correspondent Danny Savage noted that the Crown Prosecution Service had reviewed the earlier West Yorkshire Police investigation and decided that there was insufficient evidence to bring prosecutions in the UK. He said "There's a strong possibility this will be the last time these events ever have such a high public profile. The parents of Bobby and Christi say they hope this is the last time they have to go through the painful details but, above all, they hope all the publicity will prevent this happening to another family."

Writing in The Daily Telegraph in 2015 shortly after the conclusion of the inquest, Travel expert Nick Trend, said: "The most significant difference, a Thomas Cook spokesman told me, is the use of third party experts to conduct hotel inspections, introduced in 2012". He quoted the spokesman as adding, "Instruction of dedicated third party experts addresses any concerns about training, about monitoring information, about the expertise of the inspectors and the insistence of inspectors of looking at things in addition to relying upon what they are told by hoteliers."

On 17 May 2015, the children's parents reacted angrily to news that Thomas Cook had received £3.5m in compensation from the hotel in respect of lost profits and legal expenses relating to the deaths—an amount they said was ten times more than they had received themselves following the deaths of Bobby and Christi. They also said that they had first seen a letter of apology addressed to them when it was shown to them by news reporters. In a statement, Shepherd and Wood said: "We haven't had this so called letter of apology. It's not an apology for their wrongdoing but a general offer of sympathy. It does not address the central issue that their Safety Management System failed and it does not apologise for that." Thomas Cook insisted the letter had been sent by chief executive Peter Fankhauser on Friday May 15.

The following day it was announced that Thomas Cook would be donating £1.5m—which it said was the remainder left after legal costs had been taken by its insurers—to charity. Group CEO Peter Fankhauser said: "Thomas Cook has not in any way profited from our claim against the hotel owner. In late 2012, we brought a claim against the hotelier for breaching their contract to provide safe accommodation to our customers and to comply with all applicable laws, which was decided in our favour. Today I have made arrangements for the full amount—£1.5m—to be donated in full to Unicef, the world's leading children's organisation. I believe this is the right thing to do and I apologise to the family for all they have gone through."

On 19 May 2015, the family's MP Mary Creagh responded to the announcement of Thomas Cook's charitable donation, saying that the children's parents had not been consulted about it, and that relatives and friends have been giving donations to another charity in Bobby and Christi's memory. She said: "Their feeling is that this once more is not about them, it's about Thomas Cook".

A former managing director of Thomas Cook's international business and former chairman of the Association of British Travel Agents, John McEwan, told BBC Radio 4's Today programme: "I think they should have consulted the family. I think they should have actually had a discussion with the family about what would be best. I would have liked to have seen, for example, the family being involved in where should that money go, should it be used to set up a charity on behalf of the children which would perpetuate their memory? There should have been some offering of compassion, some recognition that this has been an appalling tragedy and some care exhibited for the family." In The Independent Joanna Bourke wrote: "Nothing Thomas Cook could ever do would bring back the two children killed by carbon monoxide poisoning on a Greek holiday in 2006. But the firm's handling of the case has been a lesson in how not to manage a crisis".

On 20 May 2015, Fankhauser told the BBC he was "deeply sorry" for the deaths of Christi and Bobby, saying: "It is clear that there are things that we as a company could have done better in the past nine years. In particular the way we conducted our relationship with the family and this is something that we are going to change". He added that he took responsibility for the way the company had communicated and that he regretted saying Thomas Cook had done "nothing wrong" when giving evidence at the inquest hearing. The Guardian reported that Fankhauser had declined to say what he intended to do to help Bobby and Christi's family, quoting him as saying: "I'm not going to communicate in public about what we are going to do. […] We want to help the family to move on and that is it. I don't want to repeat the mistakes the company did in the past. My intention is to see how they can move forward with their lives. I'm sorry about what they have had to go through. I'm personally sorry as a father myself." Asked if he wanted to end the wall of silence which the children's father had accused his company of hiding behind Fankhauser replied, "Yes".

The next day, Fankhauser had a three-hour meeting with the children's parents. Afterwards it was announced that Thomas Cook was to make an undisclosed "financial gesture of goodwill" to them, and Fankhauser said: "I am so grateful for the opportunity to meet and listen to Sharon Wood and Neil Shepherd. Having heard what they have had to say today, my heart breaks for them. This is a meeting which should have happened when I first took over as chief executive in November and frankly something Thomas Cook should have done nine years ago." The family said that they would be making donations to several charities. The travel company also agreed to demolish the bungalow where the children had died and to erect a playground in its place in their memory. It was later discovered that two of the hotel staff who had been convicted over the children's deaths at the Greek trial in 2010, electrician Christos Louvros and hotel manager Georgios Chrysikopoulos, had been found working at hotels used by Thomas Cook. The BBC reported that Fankhauser said he felt "physically sick" on learning this and that Chrysikopoulos had subsequently been sacked from his post in Crete. Thomas Cook announced that it had stopped sending holidaymakers to the hotel where the children had died and where Louvros was still employed.

In November 2015, the results of an independent review of Thomas Cook's crisis management procedures and the company's customer health and safety strategy were published. Written by Justin King, a former chief executive of UK supermarket chain Sainsbury's, the review's report was critical of the way that the company had dealt with the children's family, saying that its responses had been "intermittent, sometimes ill-timed and often ill-judged. […] Decisions were often not taken in the thoughtful and caring way you would expect from a company such as Thomas Cook". Amongst its recommendations, the review concluded that the company should significantly increase health and safety resources, provide greater information to customers and staff about carbon monoxide risks and safety, and create a confidential whistle-blowing mechanism for staff and contractors to raise any concerns about health and safety.

The company responded by saying that King's report made for "uncomfortable reading in parts" and that it aimed to implement its recommendations within 18 months. Chief executive Peter Fankhauser said the review would "serve as a catalyst" for the changes the company was already making, adding that, "It took us nine years to correct the mistakes of the past and to do what everyone would have expected of us; treat the family with the respect and empathy they deserve. We had to learn from this tragedy and do things differently, and this remains our commitment".

Analysing King's report, the BBC's business editor, Kamal Ahmed, said, "In an era when there is considerable suspicion about the motivation of businesses, the ability of a company to react to a crisis in a way that reveals it to be run by human beings rather than faceless chief executives is of paramount importance. Every company chief executive should read Justin King's report. And reflect on now many of the problems he has identified are also true of the businesses they run".

== Legacy ==
In 2007, Horbury Primary School, which the children had both attended, marked the anniversary of their deaths by opening a memorial garden. Head teacher John Wright said: "The garden is a beautiful tribute to two children who added so much to the school and are remembered fondly by their friends and school employees".
