= Opal Tower (Leeds) =

Building in Leeds, West Yorkshire, England

Arena Village / Opal 3, Leeds
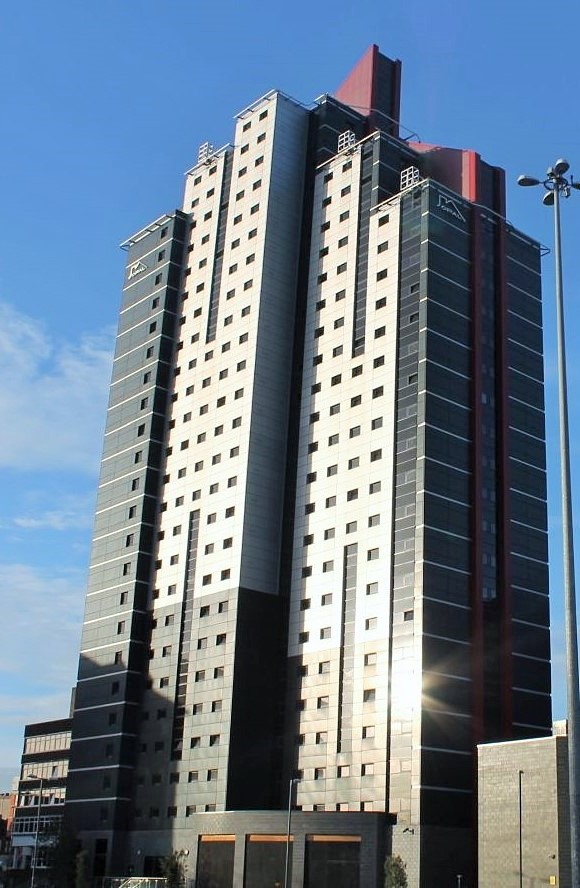
- Opal 3
- Interactive map of the Arena Village / Opal 3, Leeds area

General information
- Status: Completed
- Location: Wade Lane, Leeds, England
- Coordinates: 53.803°N 1.541°W
- Construction started: 2006
- Completed: 2008

Height
- Antenna spire: 90 metres (295 ft)
- Roof: 82 metres (269 ft)

Technical details
- Floor count: 26

Design and construction
- Architect: Morrison Design
- Developer: Opal Property Group
- Main contractor: Ocon Construction Ltd

Opal Tower (officially known as Opal 3, Leeds) is a 25-storey building in Leeds, West Yorkshire, England.

It serves as student accommodation for 542 students, and is close to the City campus of Leeds Beckett University and the University of Leeds.

As of 2018, it was the fourth tallest building in Leeds.

== Construction ==
The initial planning application for this site (previously occupied by the Londoner pub) on Jacob St, Leeds city centre, was submitted in July 2005, for a 23-storey student apartment block. This design was later altered after initial approval and permission was granted in December 2006 to build the current 25 storey tower.

Construction work began in early 2007 with an expected completion date of September 2008. The building was designed by Morrison Design and was developed by Opal Property Group, with the site contractor being Ocon Construction. Construction was completed on time, with the development opening to its student tenants between the 15th and 20th. The development is the fourth tallest building in Leeds, after Altus House, Bridgewater Place and The Plaza Tower which took Opal 3's title as second tallest approximately a year after its completion.

== Accommodation ==
Opal 3 features cluster flats for up to 6 students, with single en-suite rooms being the bulk of accommodation, complemented by deluxe rooms (which have a double bed), and a small number of studio flats on the higher floors.

== Reception ==
A 2008 article in Building Design said that "Morrison Design's Opal Tower is nearly as tall and as mean as Sky Plaza, again for the city's ruthlessly exploited student population, but is more clunky than horrifying."

== See also ==
- List of tallest buildings and structures in Leeds
- Architecture of Leeds
