= William Mace =

William Mace (died 1767) was an English Gresham Professor of Law, from 1744, and Fellow of the Royal Society.

Mace is known also for philosophical interests, where he has been considered a follower of George Berkeley, and a thinker who anticipated David Hume. He was a correspondent of Francis Hutcheson. His views on the mind-body problem, Hutcheson reports, were in circulation in Dublin. He also was in touch with John Colson, and associated with Ephraim Chambers.

Mace has frequently been confused with Daniel Mace, the real author of the anonymous New Testament in Greek and English of 1729.
