= Joshua B. Huckeby =

American politician

Joshua Brannon Huckeby

Member of the Indiana House of Representatives from Perry County, Indiana
- In office 1836 – 1837; 1842–1843; 1844–1845

Prosecuting Attorney of the 3rd Indiana District Common Pleas Court from Perry County
- In office 1854–1856

Personal details
- Born: February 13, 1802 Bedford County, Virginia, United States
- Died: March 22, 1889 (aged 87) Virginia Place, Cannelton, Perry County, Indiana, United States
- Resting place: Cliff Cemetery, Cannelton, Perry County, Indiana, United States
- Party: Whig; Constitutional Union; Republican
- Spouse: Rebecca Huckeby (née Lang)
- Children: 9 offspring: Mary Ann Huckeby; Rachel Littell Huckeby; Eliza Ellen Huckeby; Elizabeth Huckeby; John Lang Huckeby; William Lamb Huckeby; Sarah Jane Huckeby; Isabelle Huckeby; Thomas Jefferson Huckeby
- Occupation: Politician, lawyer, tavern keeper

Joshua Brannon Huckeby (February 13, 1802 – March 22, 1889) was a 19th-century American politician and lawyer. Huckeby represented Perry County, Indiana, in the Indiana House of Representatives during the 21st, 27th, and 29th sessions of the Indiana General Assembly. He served as Prosecuting Attorney for the 3rd Indiana District Common Pleas Court from 1854 to 1856.

== Family ==
Huckeby was born near the courthouse at Liberty in Bedford County, Virginia, to John Huckeby, Sr. (1774–1827) and his wife, Frances Anne (Brannon) Huckeby (1781–1851). John was a local farmer. In 1805, John and his family left their home near the Peaks of Otter and moved to Barren County, Kentucky, living successively in Garrard, Lincoln, and Breckinridge counties in Kentucky.

His paternal grandparents were Thomas Huckaby and Keziah Self. Thomas was born in Virginia but later settled in Kentucky. His ancestors had come from the east of England to Colony of Virginia during the reign of King Charles II of England. Keziah was the daughter of William Self of Cumberland County, Virginia.

His mother's father, Lawrence Brannon, was of Irish descent. His wife, Olympias Brannon, née Loudoun, had been left an orphan in infancy.

== Early life and marriage ==
In common with most of his contemporaries of the frontier, Huckeby grew up without the privilege of even a common school education. Altogether his schooling did not amount to a term of three months.

In 1823, he left Breckinridge County, Kentucky and came to Perry County, Indiana, settling near the town of Rome. There he met Rebecca "Becky" Lang (1808–1891), and after a brief courtship they were married at Rome by her stepfather, Lemuel Mallory (1763–1851), on April 4, 1824. Joshua and Rebecca Huckeby were the parents of nine children, three sons and six daughters: Mary Ann (1826–1864), Rachel Littell (1828–1883), Eliza Ellen (1830–1901), Elizabeth (c.1833–1852), John Lang (1835–1882), William Lamb (c. 1838–1903), Sarah Jane (1840–1852), Isabelle (1845–1909), and Thomas Jefferson (1847–1849).

The family moved from Rome to Cannelton, Indiana, c. 1848. As in Rome, he operated a tavern in Cannelton for a while. In 1856, he bought a house from R. Henry Gay on Taylor Street. This house would come to be known as the Virginia Place.

== Political career ==
Huckeby was elected a justice of the peace in 1833, served on the county board of school examiners in 1836, and was county surplus revenue agent in 1843. He represented the county in the Indiana General Assembly for the sessions of 1836–1837, 1842–1843, and 1844–1845, but lost for state representative in 1846 and 1850. He was a staunch Whig while that party maintained its organization, and in 1860 was an elector for John Bell and Edward Everett. After this he united with the Republican Party and became its earnest and sincere supporter. His bitter and unrelenting opposition to the Democratic Party often led him into unpleasant controversies.

Fellow members of the same legislature, with whom Huckeby was more or less closely associated, regardless of political differences, were James D. Williams, William A. Bowles, Samuel Hanna, David Macy, David P. Holloway, and William Hayden English. Huckeby also corresponded with Robert Dale Owen of New Harmony, Indiana.

From 1854 to 1856, he served as prosecuting attorney for the 3rd Indiana District Common Pleas Court, discharging his duties with marked ability, and for several years thereafter practiced his profession with vigor and success. For several years of the latter part of his life, from 1871 to 1884, he served as postmaster at Cannelton.

His grandson, Thomas James de la Hunt, Jr. (1866–1933) wrote this of his grandfather, "He was a marked example of the Old School politician, violently unrelenting in many inherited prejudices, and always delighting to dwell reminiscently upon the political triumphs of those early years when–it was his favorite boast–he knew every man in Perry County, his politics, his religion, and the nighest way to his house."

== American Civil War ==
Huckeby was a supporter of the Union during the American Civil War (1861–1865). In the 1860 presidential election, Huckeby's southern birth and conservatism allied him with the Constitutional Union Party, and he was placed upon the Bell and Everett ticket as elector for the First District of Indiana, to which Perry County then belonged. However, in this sentiment he was not upheld by his wife and his two sons, who were adherents of Abraham Lincoln. His wife, Rebecca, was a distant cousin of John Henninger Reagan of Texas, Postmaster General of the Confederate States of America.

In 1861, at the outbreak of the American Civil War, Governor of Indiana Oliver P. Morton ordered that Perry County send its muskets to Indianapolis, Indiana, for the war. However, the weapons were removed by local residents and hid on Huckeby's property. A reward was offered for their return, but it was some time until the circumstances connected with the removal of the weapons were divulged.

In 1864, Huckeby entertained Captain Edmund Morgan of the United States Navy paddle steamer USS Springfield at his home, the Virginia Place. This house, which is still standing, was built during the early 1850s and is believed by locals to be haunted. The house remained in the Huckeby/DeLaHunt family from 1856 to 1933. In 2007, Jill Harris Newton published a book about this entitled Ghosts of the Virginia Place.

His two sons, Captain John Lang Huckeby and William Lamb Huckeby, served in the Civil War. His daughter, Rachel Littell (Huckeby) Mason was president of the Ladies' Patriotic Aid Association which supplied the Quartermaster-General at Indianapolis with much needed clothing for soldiers. Her husband, Judge Charles Holland Mason (1822–1894) served as a colonel during the war. His youngest daughter, Isabelle Huckeby, married Major Thomas James de la Hunt, Sr. (1835–1872) after the Civil War.

== Death ==
Huckeby died at his home "Virginia Place" in Cannelton on the morning of March 22, 1889, at 87 years of age. He was survived by his wife and three children. His funeral took place from St. Luke's Episcopal Church on 24th. As the oldest Freemason in the county, his local lodge and the neighboring lodges from Tell City, Indiana, and Hawesville, Kentucky, were in attendance. He was interred in Cliff Cemetery in Cannelton.

His grandson, Thomas James de la Hunt, Jr. (1866–1933) was a well-known writer and newspaper columnist.

== See also ==
- Charles Holland Mason
- Indiana House of Representatives
- Perry County, Indiana
- Robert Dale Owen
- William Hayden English
