= Robert Heuston =

Irish legal scholar and historian

Robert Francis Vere Heuston, QC (Hon.), FBA (17 November 1923 – 21 December 1995), sometimes given as R. F. V. Heuston, was an Irish legal scholar and legal historian. He is best known for his Lives of the Lord Chancellors.

Heuston was born in Dublin, the eldest son of Vere Douglas Heuston, general manager of the Guinness Brewery, and of Dorothy Helen Heuston, née Coulter. He was related to the Irish nationalist Robert Emmet. He was educated at St Columba's College, Dublin and Trinity College Dublin, where he read Law and obtained first-class honours. He was also auditor of the College Historical Society.

Heuston was called to the Irish Bar by King's Inns in 1947, but decided to pursue an academic career. He joined St John's College, Cambridge as a research student, but soon left Cambridge, upon his election as the first law fellow of Pembroke College, Oxford in 1947, where he remained until 1965, when he joined the University of Southampton as a Professor of Law. He was Gresham Professor of Law between 1964 and 1970 and Regius Professor of Laws at Trinity College Dublin between 1970 and 1983.

== Works ==
Heuston published works on constitutional law (Essays in Constitutional Law, 1961) and torts (Salmond and Heuston on the Law of Torts). However, he is best known for his Lives of the Lord Chancellors, 1885-40 and Lives of the Lord Chancellors: 1940-1970, containing biographies of Lord Chancellors from Lord Halsbury to Lord Gardiner.

== Honours ==
Heuston was elected an honorary fellow of Pembroke College, Cambridge in 1982, honorary bencher of King's Inns in 1983, honorary bencher of Gray's Inn in 1988, and a Corresponding Fellow of the British Academy in 1993. He was appointed an honorary Queen's Counsel in 1995.
