= Daniel Mace (biblical scholar) =

English textual critic

Daniel Mace (died c. 1753) was an English textual critic of the New Testament. He was a Presbyterian minister at Newbury, Berkshire, from 1727 until his death. He anticipated some conclusions of the textual critics of a century later. His results were incorporated in The New Testament in Greek and English, 2 vols., 1729, to which Leonard Twells issued a reply defending the Textus Receptus.

== Life ==
Mace took charge of the presbyterian congregation at Newbury, Berkshire, preaching his first sermon there on 5 March 1727; he succeeded Joseph Standen, who had joined the Church of England. In 1729 his edition of the New Testament appeared anonymously.

Mace died about Christmas 1753, and was buried in his meeting-house, near the pulpit. He left a widow, a son and a daughter.

== Works ==
Mace published one major work The New Testament in Greek and English, containing the Original Text corrected from the Authority of the most authentic Manuscripts, 1729, 2 vols, (anon.) It has been attributed wrongly to William Mace. The dedication to Peter King, 1st Baron King, at that time lord chancellor, refers to King's History of the Apostles' Creed (1702). For the materials of his text he relied on John Mill. Critical and historical notes were given as footnotes, or appended to the different books.

Mace's edition was roughly handled by advocates of the received text, especially by Leonard Twells. Frederick Henry Ambrose Scrivener treated it with very unwise contempt. Readings of the anonymus Anglus were discussed in the later volumes of Johann Christoph Wolf's Curæ Philologicæ et Criticæ in Novum Testamentum 1725–35. In the version, unusual typography (seen also in Charles Bulkley) was added to odd vocabulary.

Mace published also XIX Sermons (1751). The list of subscribers included David Hartley and John Taylor.

== Notes ==
Attribution

This article incorporates text from a publication now in the public domain: Gordon, Alexander (1893). "Mace, Daniel". In Lee, Sidney (ed.). Dictionary of National Biography. Vol. 35. London: Smith, Elder & Co.
