= Thomas James De la Hunt =

Thomas J. De la Hunt
- Born: Thomas James De la Hunt, Jr. November 9, 1866; Cannelton, Perry County, Indiana, United States
- Died: July 3, 1933 (age 66); Virginia Place, Cannelton, Perry County, Indiana, United States
- Resting place: Cliff Cemetery, Cannelton, Indiana
- Education: Purdue University, University of the South
- Occupations: Writer, historian
- Relatives: Joshua Brannon Huckeby (grandfather), Charles Holland Mason (uncle)
- Writing career
- Language: English
- Genre: Historical
- Subject: Indiana history

Thomas James De la Hunt Jr. (November 9, 1866 – July 3, 1933) was an American newspaper columnist, writer, and historian. He served as president and secretary of the Southwestern Indiana Historical Society for a number of years. He was well known for his writings concerning the area of Indiana known as "the Pocket" and was considered an authority on the history of southern Indiana.

== Background ==
De la Hunt was born in Cannelton, Perry County, Indiana to Major Thomas James De la Hunt Sr. (1835–1872) and his wife, Isabelle (Huckeby) De la Hunt (1845–1909). He had one other sibling, Charles Mason De la Hunt, who died in 1869. His father was an immigrant from County Tipperary, Ireland. His mother was the daughter of J. B. Huckeby, an Indiana legislator and prominent Cannelton lawyer. He never married.

== Career ==
De la Hunt received his early education from his mother and in the Cannelton public schools. Afterwards, he attended Sewanee University (now University of the South) at Sewanee, Tennessee, and studied architecture at Purdue University in West Lafayette, Indiana. Upon leaving college, he taught for seven years in the Cannelton public schools and gave private music lessons to students.

He was involved in the insurance business for several years. During his later years, he devoted his time entirely to writing and historical research. In 1916 De la Hunt wrote a script and produced the pageant given at Cannelton to celebrate the one hundredth anniversary of Indiana's admission to the Union. In connection with the same celebration, he also wrote a history of Perry County, Indiana, recognized by authorities as unexcelled in that particular field.

De la Hunt achieved further distinction in southern Indiana with his column, "The Pocket Periscope", featured over a number of years in the Evansville Courier and Journal. In this column he presented a series of historical sketches of particular interest to the "Pocket Section" of Indiana. He was also correspondent of the Indianapolis News, the Louisville Courier Journal, and the Owensboro, Kentucky Messenger. He edited the Cannelton column in the Tell City News over a period of about eight years. At various times he did special research and catalogue work for a number of libraries in southern Indiana. Many of his writings were published in the Indiana History Bulletin and the Indiana Magazine of History.

== Later life ==
Until incapacitated by ill health, De la Hunt was active in patriotic and historical organizations and took great pride in his membership in the same. In the Sons of the American Revolution he served as vice president and treasurer for Indiana over a period of years. In the Society of Indiana Pioneers he served on various committees. He was president and secretary of the Southwestern Indiana Historical Society for several years. In 1931 and 1932 he was president of the Perry County Historical Society. He also served as president of the Indiana Authors Club and was a charter member of the Men's Community Bible Class of Cannelton.

De la Hunt died at his home, the Virginia Place, in Cannelton on July 3, 1933, at the age 66. His house is still standing and is rumoured by local citizens to be haunted. Jill Harris Newton wrote a book about this house, Ghosts of the Virginia Place, which was published in 2007.

== Works ==
- The Pageant of Perry County, 1814–1916. (1916)
- Perry County: A History. (1916)
- History of the New Harmony Working Men's Institute, New Harmony, Indiana: founded by William Maclure, 1838–1927. (1927)

== See also ==
- History of Indiana
- New Harmony, Indiana
- Perry County, Indiana
- Southern Indiana
- Southwestern Indiana
