= Clive M. Schmitthoff =

Anglo-German legal scholar

Clive Maximilian Schmitthoff (24 March 1903 – 30 September 1990) was an Anglo-German legal scholar. He served as Gresham Professor of Law in London from 1976 to 1987, and is known for his contributions to trade law.

Born as Maximilian Schmulewitz in Berlin, to Anna and Hermann Schmulewitz (who later adopted the name Schmitthoff), he obtained his doctorate in law under the supervision of Martin Wolff at the Humboldt University of Berlin in 1927. Being Jewish, he emigrated to the United Kingdom following the Machtergreifung in 1933. He joined the British army in 1940, and adopted the name "Clive Macmillan" to disguise his origins in case he was captured.

Schmitthoff received an Honorary Doctorate from Heriot-Watt University in 1978.
