= Gresham Professor of Law =

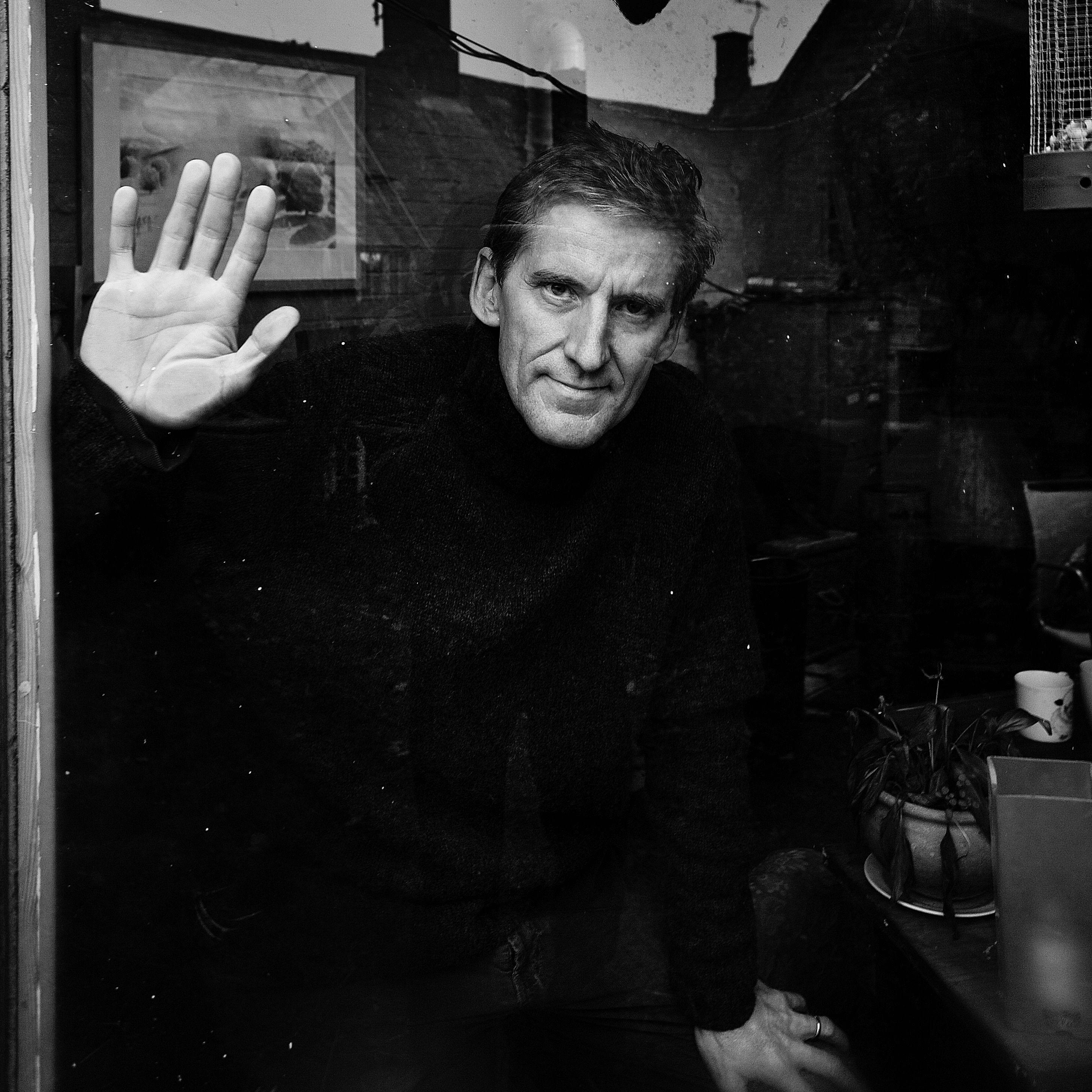
Clive Stafford Smith JD OBE, appointed Gresham Professor of Law in 2024

The Professor of Law at Gresham College, London, gives free educational lectures to the general public. The college was founded for this purpose in 1597, when it created seven professorships; this was later increased to ten. Law is one of the original professorships as set out by the will of Thomas Gresham in 1575.

The Professor of Law is appointed in partnership with the Worshipful Company of Mercers.

== List of Gresham Professors of Law ==
Note, years given as, say, 1596/7 refer to Old Style and New Style dates.

	Name	Started
1	Henry Mowtlowe	March 1596/7
2	Clement Corbet	May 1607
3	Thomas Eden	10 Nov 1613
4	Benjamin Thorneton	27 July 1640
5	Joshua Crosse	29 March 1644
6	Thomas Leonard	4 May 1649
7	John Bond	12 March 1649/50
8	Benjamin Thorneton	23 Oct 1660
9	Richard Pearson	8 Oct 1667
10	John Clarke	9 August 1670
11	Roger Meredith	7 March 1672/3
12	Robert Briggs	7 Feb 1686/7
13	John Cumyng	1 May 1719
14	William Mace	30 August 1744
15	Joseph Jeffries	20 May 1767
16	T Taylor	23 Jan 1784
17	William Jocelyn Palmer	14 Jan 1808
18	William Palmer	5 Feb 1836
19	John Thomas Abdy	18 June 1858
20	George Holmes Blakesley	23 April 1896
21	William Blake Odgers	27 March 1907
22	Geoffrey Walter Wrangham	22 May 1925
23	William Arthian Davies	16 March 1934
Lectures in abeyance 1939–45
24	Eric Sachs	6 June 1946
25	Richard O'Sullivan	6 July 1950
26	Richard Jon Harvey	1962
27	R F V Heuston	1965
28	P. R. Glazebrook	1971
29	Clive M. Schmitthoff	1976–86?
30	Kenneth R. Simmonds	1988
31	Sir David Calcutt QC	1 Sept 1992
32	Simon Lee	1 Sept 1995
33	Gerald Wakefield	1 Sept 1998
34	Richard Susskind OBE FRSE KC	1 Sept 2000
35	Sir Vernon Bogdanor CBE FRSA FBA	1 Sept 2004
36	Baroness Ruth Deech DBE	1 Sept 2008
37	Sir Geoffrey Nice KC	2012
38	Jo Delahunty KC	2016
39	Leslie Thomas KC	2020
40	Clive Stafford Smith JD OBE	2024
