= Leslie Thomas (barrister) =

British barrister

Leslie Thomas KC
- Born: April 29, 1965 (age 61); London, England
- Education: Kingston University, LLB
- Occupation: Barrister
- Years active: 1988–
- Organization(s): Garden Court Chambers, Lincoln's Inn Fields
- Known for: Human rights lawyer and civil liberties campaigner
- Website: https://www.gardencourtchambers.co.uk/barristers/leslie-thomas-qc/sao

Leslie Thomas KC (born 29 April 1965) is a British barrister and law professor. He has acted on a number of high-profile death cases and inquests, and is noted as a "star individual" for Police Law (Claimant) work in Chambers and Partners with specialist expertise in cases of death in custody and death at the hands of the police.

== Education ==
Thomas was born and grew up in London, and attended an Inner London comprehensive school. He has described having had to re-take his A-Level examinations while at school. On completing his schooling, he attended Kingston Polytechnic from 1983 to 1987. In 2013, he received an honorary doctorate from Kingston.

== Career ==
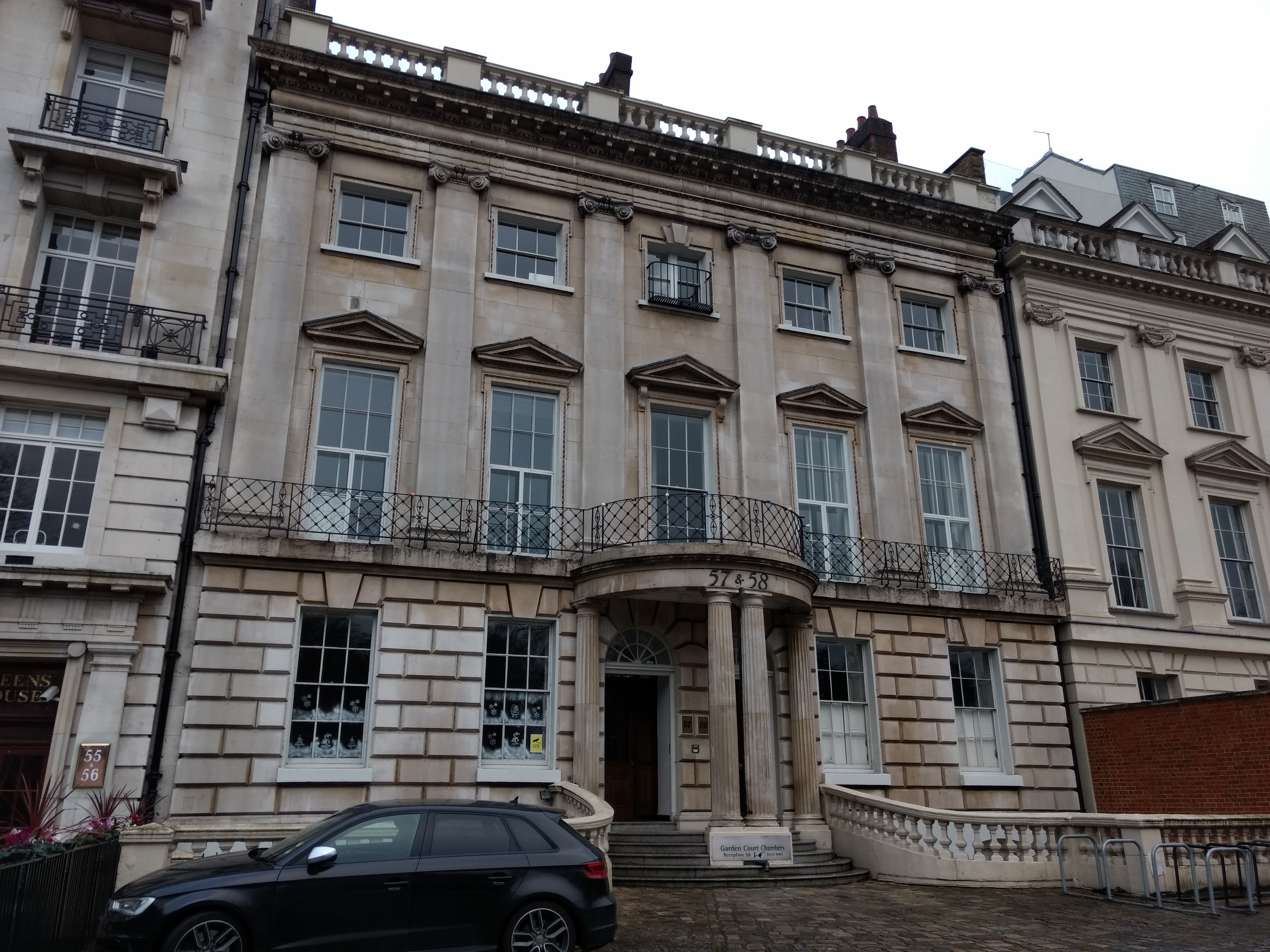
Location of Garden Court Chambers in 57 & 58 Lincoln's Inn Fields

Thomas initially lectured at the University of Westminster, Kingston University, and the Open University until he was called to the bar in 1988 following completion of his LLB. He began his career as a pupil in the then 13 King's Bench Walk. Following this, he joined the now dissolved Wellington Street Chambers, led by Lord Gifford QC. Thomas currently practises from Garden Court Chambers.

He first set precedent in the UK when he secured first unlawful killing decision against a serving police officer in the Azelle Rodney public shooting enquiry in 2013. In 2014, he represented 11 families who lost relatives in the Hillsborough disaster.

In 2015, he was the counsel for the parents of Christianne and Robert Shepherd who died of carbon monoxide poisoning while on holiday in Corfu in October 2006. The same year, he represented the family of Eleanor De Freitas at the inquest into her death.

He was lead counsel to the family of Mark Duggan at the 2016 inquest into Duggan's death.

In 2019 he was instructed by Hudgell Solicitors on behalf of the family of the late AM Carl Sargeant. The hearing centred around controversial decisions taken by former First Minister of Wales Carwyn Jones prior to Mr Sargeant's suicide. Thomas successfully prevented Cathryn McGahey QC (representing Jones) from introducing unproven allegations of misconduct against Sargeant to the inquiry, insisting that the "deceased person is not here to defend themselves" and that "there has been no investigation into these rumours and suspicion". In siding with Thomas, coroner, John Gittins, ruled that the effort by McGahey on behalf of Carwyn Jones was "astounding" and "opportunistic".

He is an advocacy trainer for the Inner Temple, former director of both Liberty and the Civil Liberties Trust, and an independent member on the Standards Committee for public life for Lewisham Council. He is also 3rd edition co-author of the practitioners' guide, Inquest.

In 2020, he was appointed Gresham Professor of Law.

In 2023 Thomas appeared on behalf of the Federation of Ethnic Minority Healthcare Organisations (FEMHO) at The UK Covid-19 Inquiry, which was set up to examine the UK’s response to and impact of the Covid-19 pandemic.

== Personal life ==
Thomas is described as having an interest in motorcycles, and knowledge of the tenor saxophone. He is also competent in both Russian and French. He has previously called for wigs worn as part of court dress to be banned on racial exclusion grounds.

== Honours ==
- 2012: Legal Aid Practitioners Group - Legal Aid Lawyer of the Year
- 2013: Awarded an Honorary Doctorate in Law from Kingston University for services for civil rights
- 2014: Queen's Counsel
- 2014: The Lawyer - Hot Lawyers of 2014 List
- 2016: Legal Aid Practitioners Group - Legal Aid Lawyers Award
- 2017: The UK Diversity Legal Awards - Lifetime Achievement Award

== Publications ==
- Inquests: A practitioner's guide. Legal Action. Three editions. (co-author)
