= Murder of Somaiya Begum =

2022 murder in Bradford, England

- Location: 53.7967530°N 1.7341604°W; Bradford, England
- Date: 25 June 2022
- Attack type: Domestic homicide, Stabbing, Blunt trauma
- Deaths: 1
- Convictions: Murder (sentenced to Life imprisonment with a minimum of 25 years)

The murder of Somaiya Begum occurred in June 2022 in Bradford, England. Somaiya, a 20-year-old biomedical science student at Leeds Beckett University, was reported missing on 25 June 2022, and her remains were later found near Fitzwilliam Street in Bradford. West Yorkshire Police investigated, leading to the arrest of her uncle, Mohammed Taroos Khan, who was convicted of her murder. In 2023, Khan was sentenced to life imprisonment with a minimum term of 25 years at Bradford Crown Court, following a trial that included evidence related to family disputes.

== Background ==
Somaiya resided on Binnie Street in Bradford with her grandmother and an uncle after no longer living with her immediate family due to personal and legal disagreements. In 2019, at age 16, she was placed under a Forced Marriage Protection Order (FMPO) following her father's attempt to arrange her marriage in Pakistan. The order prohibited her from being taken out of the country or compelled into marriage. Her extended family had a history of disputes involving cultural expectations, personal autonomy, and financial issues. These disputes remained unresolved until her death in June 2022.

== Murder ==
According to Home Office forensic pathologist Kirsten Hope, a cause of death of unable to be determined due to the advanced decomposition of the body, especially of her head and neck, by the time it was found. A 10.7-centimetre (4.2 in) spike was found lodged in Somaiya's back, and it had entered into her lung. Her body was wrapped in a carpet and then dumped in "waste ground" (unused area) and buried in rubbish.

== See also ==
- Domestic violence in the United Kingdom
- Forced marriage
- Honor killing
