= Opal Property Group =

Property company of the United Kingdom

Coordinates: 53.4792°N 2.2311°W

- Industry: Property
- Founded: 1998
- Founder: Stuart Wall
- Headquarters: Manchester, United Kingdom
- Area served: United Kingdom
- Key people: Stuart Wall (founder and owner); Joe Dwek, Don Hanson, John K Berry (non-executive directors)
- Revenue: £143m (Sep 2012)
- Total assets: £1.069bn (Sep 2012)
- Owner: Stuart Wall
- Number of employees: 550
- Subsidiaries: Ocon Construction
- Website: www.opalgroup.com

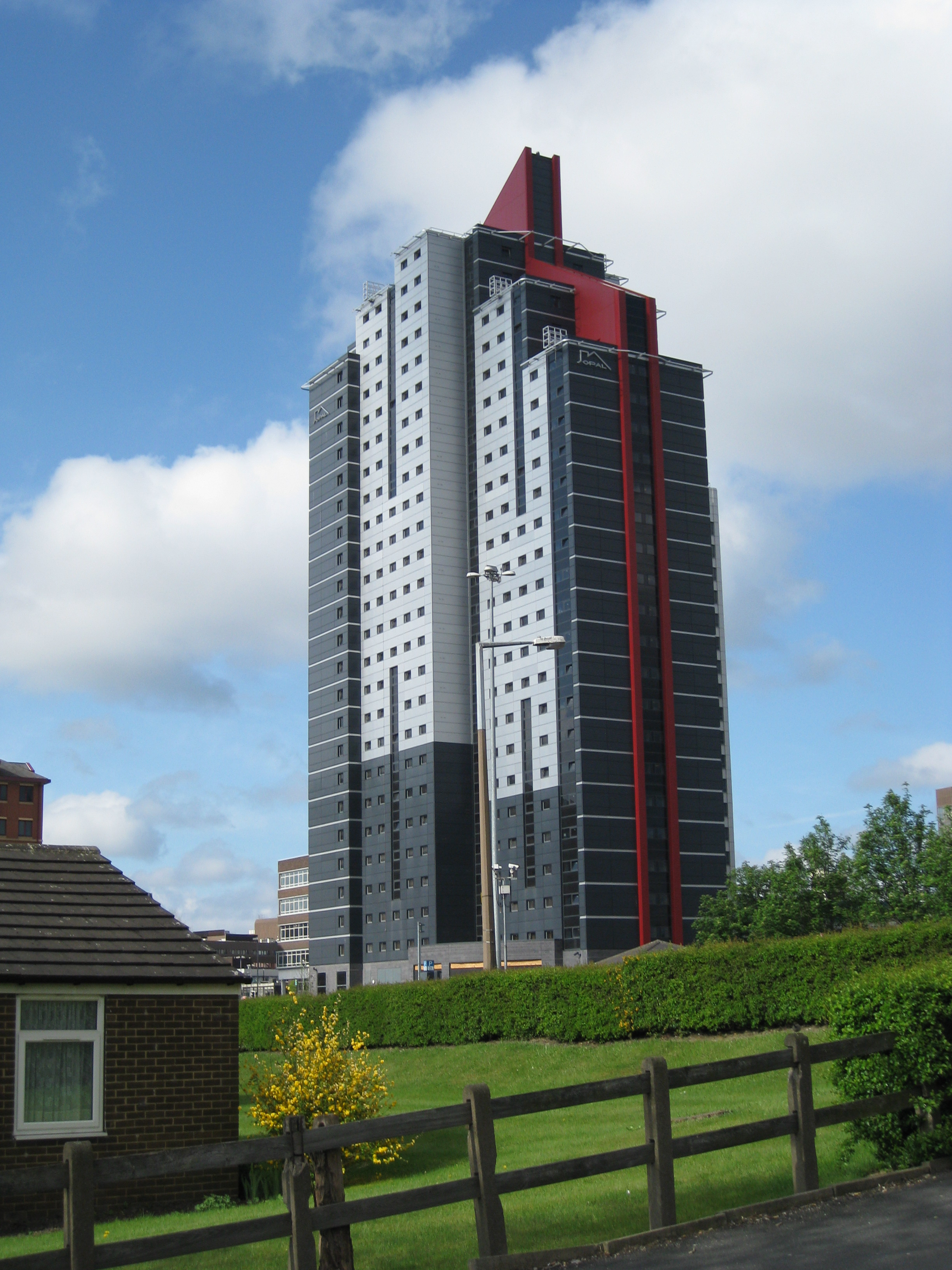
Opal 3 in Leeds, one of the company's student accommodation buildings

Opal Property Group Limited, often referred to as Opal, was a company based in the United Kingdom which operates a number of large property developments in UK cities, targeted at students and private renters. Founded in 1998 by Stuart Wall, Opal was the largest provider of private student accommodation in the UK, providing accommodation for 20,000 students. The company went into administration in 2013 and its properties were transferred to other organisations.

== History ==
The company was founded in 1998.

=== 2013 ===
In March 2013, the company reported that one of its subsidiaries, Ocon Construction, was to be put into administration. The parent company Opal may be broken up if loan extensions with the banks cannot be agreed.

13 further Opal property subsidiaries in Liverpool, Manchester, Bradford, Dundee, Huddersfield, Leeds, Leicester, London and Wolverhampton went into administration in March.

As of April 2013, much of the various sub companies in the group were in the hands of administrators with various property management companies brought in to oversee the developments whilst buyers were sought.

== Properties ==
Opal's properties include:

- Birmingham - Opal 1 in Highgate
- Leeds
  - Opal 1
  - Opal 2
  - Opal Tower (Opal 3)
- Leicester - halls of residence including Opal Court, which was nominated for the 2007 Carbuncle Cup
- London
  - Opal 1 in Hoxton (University of the Arts London)
  - Opal 2 in Greenwich
  - Opal 3 in Holloway
  - Opal 4 in Tufnell Park
- Manchester - ‘Wilmslow Park’ which was the UKs largest private student residence and other accommodation blocks around Whitworth Street
- Nottingham -
  - Sutton Bonington Halls (Now ran by Campus Living Villages)
  - Opal 2 (Now called Nottingham Two) halls of residence with common room and gymnasium
- Newport - Opal 1
- Sheffield
  - Opal 1 near the Devonshire Quarter
  - Opal 2 in Netherthorpe (now called "Allen Court" and run by Greystar Real Estate Partners)
  - Opal 3, also in Netherthorpe
