= Simon Lee (legal scholar) =

British legal scholar and academic (born 1957)

- Born: Simon Francis Lee; 29 March 1957 (age 69); Gillingham, Kent, United Kingdom
- Known for: Co-founding Initiative '92; Rectorship of Liverpool Hope University; Writings on law, religion, and sports

Academic background
- Education: Balliol College, Oxford (BA); Yale Law School (LLM); Honorary Doctorate, Virginia Theological Seminary (2011); Honorary Doctorate, Liverpool Hope University (2016)

Academic work
- Institutions: Aston University; Open University; Cambridge Theological Federation; Leeds Metropolitan University; Liverpool Hope University; Queen's University Belfast

Simon Francis Lee (born 29 March 1957) is a British legal scholar. He is Emeritus Professor of Jurisprudence at Queen's University Belfast and was most recently a Professor of Law at Aston University. He is the Chair of the William Temple Foundation and of the Everton Library Trust.

Lee's career has included leadership roles as Rector of Liverpool Hope University (1995–2003) and Vice-Chancellor of Leeds Metropolitan University (2003–2009). He is also known for his involvement in the Northern Ireland peace process, specifically through the co-founding of "Initiative '92" and his work with the Standing Advisory Commission on Human Rights.

== Early life and education ==
Lee was born in Gillingham, Kent. He attended school locally before winning the Brackenbury Scholarship to read Jurisprudence at Balliol College, Oxford. During his time at Oxford, he achieved significant academic distinction: in 1977 he won the Sweet & Maxwell Prize for the "Best Distinction in Law Moderations", and in 1978 he won the Winter Williams Essay Prize. He took first-class honours in 1979. Following his undergraduate studies, Lee attended Yale Law School as a Harkness Fellow, where he studied for an LLM.

== Academic career ==
=== Early teaching ===
Lee began his academic career teaching law at Trinity College, Oxford, and subsequently at King's College London. His scholarship spans disciplines such as law, ethics, religion, politics, history, and sports.

=== Queen's University Belfast ===
In 1989, at the age of 31, Lee was appointed Professor of Jurisprudence at Queen's University, Belfast.

While at Queen's, Lee co-founded Initiative '92 with Robin Wilson. This initiative established the Opsahl Commission, chaired by Torkel Opsahl, which sought opinions from across Northern Ireland's political parties and community groups on ways forward for the region.

=== Liverpool Hope University ===
In 1995, Lee returned to England to become the Gresham Professor of Law (1995–1998) and the Chief Executive and Rector of the Liverpool Institute of Higher Education (LIHE).

Under his leadership, the institution became Liverpool Hope University College and the first college in the UK to secure degree-awarding powers under the government's new system. Lee served under the guidance of Bishop David Sheppard, as chair of Hope's governing body, who described Lee as bringing "flair and imagination" to the institution. His tenure saw the development of the "Hope" brand, the creation of the Creative Campus at Everton, and the establishment of the Network of Hope partnership. The university college's work with Tibetan refugee children in Ladakh through "Hope One World" won a Queen's Anniversary Prize in 1996, and Hope was awarded the Freedom of the City of Liverpool in the same year.

On 26 January 2016, Liverpool Hope University presented Lee with an honorary Doctor of Humane Letters in recognition of his contributions as Rector.

=== Leeds Metropolitan University ===
Lee was appointed Vice-Chancellor of Leeds Metropolitan University (now Leeds Beckett University) in 2003. In his inaugural lecture, he announced plans to develop the "Rose Bowl" building and entered a partnership with Leeds Rugby. This partnership led to the construction of the Carnegie Stand, extending the university's campus into the Headingley Stadium.

During his tenure, the university achieved recognition for its environmental efforts, topping the People & Planet "Green League" table in 2007, and was named the Times Higher Education "University of the Year" runner-up for its "low-charging, high impact" strategy. Lee left the university in 2009.

In an article for the Times Higher, Lee outlined the issues for leaving Leeds Metropolitan University. This included the following statement from the chair of governors, Ninian Watt "I should like to thank you, personally and on behalf of the board of governors of the university, for the very considerable success you have had as vice-chancellor throughout what will be six years," Watt wrote. "In particular you have led the transformation of the university's estate, revitalized the 'Carnegie' brand, transformed the external perception of the university, and achieved the designation of the UK Centre for Coaching Excellence. For all of this, I thank you most sincerely. May I also wish you every success in your future career." Following Lee's departure, an audit of senior managers' expenses was undertaken by KPMG. The outcome resulted in a complete exoneration of Lee.

=== Later and current roles ===
After leaving Leeds, Lee established Level Partnerships (2010–2015) and served as Executive Director of the Cambridge Theological Federation (2014–2016). He was a Fellow of St Edmund's College, Cambridge from 2015 to 2017.

He subsequently served as Professor of Law at the Open University (2015–2022), where he was Director of Research for the Law School and led the "Year of Mygration" project, which published 250 daily blog posts on migration. He also delivered an inaugural lecture titled "Open and Shut Cases".

Afterwards, Lee became a Professor of Law at Aston University Law School (2022–2025), where he focused on interdisciplinary research into justice, diversity, and inclusion. He is the currently Chair of the William Temple Foundation (since 2021) and the Everton Library Trust (since 2025).

== Public life and other roles ==
Lee has held numerous non-executive roles across religion, the arts, and sport. He was the inaugural Chair of the John Paul II Foundation for Sport (2010–2014) and chaired the Podium organization, which coordinated university contributions to the London 2012 Olympics. He has also served as Chair of the Everyman Theatre and Playhouse Theatre in Liverpool (1998–2002) and the Northern Ballet Theatre (2006–2010).

In 2011, he was awarded an Honorary Doctorate of Humane Letters by the Virginia Theological Seminary for his work in ecumenism and peace-building.

== Selected publications ==
Lee has written extensively on law, theology, and public policy. Some of his books and articles include the following.

=== Books ===
- Lee, Simon (1986). Law and Morals. Oxford University Press. ISBN 978-0192830524.
- Lee, Simon (1988). Judging Judges. Faber & Faber. ISBN 978-0571151608.
- Lee, Simon (1990). The Cost of Free Speech. Faber & Faber. ISBN 978-0571142187.
- Lee, Simon F.; Fox, Marie (1994). Learning Legal Skills. Blackstone Press (AT). ISBN 978-1-85431-333-1.
- Lee, Simon (2003). Uneasy Ethics. Pimlico. ISBN 978-0712660310.
- Lee, Simon (2014). Vincent's 1863-2013. Third Millennium. ISBN 978-1908990181.
- Lee, Simon; Markham, Ian, eds. (2023). The Serendipity of Hope. Wipf and Stock. ISBN 978-1666755862.

=== Articles and book chapters ===
- Cheney, Thomas; Newman, Christopher; Olsson-Francis, Karen; Steele, Scott; Pearson, Victoria; Lee, Simon (2020). "Planetary Protection in the New Space Era: Science and Governance". Frontiers in Astronomy and Space Sciences. 7. doi:10.3389/fspas.2020.589817. ISSN 2296-987X.
- Lee, Simon (2022). "A Balliol quartet and the welfare state: Temple, Beveridge, Tawney and Toynbee". Theology. 125 (4): 252–257. doi:10.1177/0040571X221106453. ISSN 0040-571X.
- Lee, Simon (2022). "Towards an A to Z of Faith in Sport". In Torevell, David; Palmer, Clive; Rowan, Paul (eds.). Training the Body: Perspectives From Religion, Physical Culture and Sport. London: Routledge. doi:10.4324/9781003224112. ISBN 978-1-003-22411-2.
- Lee, Simon (2025). ""Amazing Grace" for Lawyers". Amazing Grace at 250. London: Routledge. doi:10.4324/9781003492580-16. ISBN 978-1-003-49258-0.
- Lee, Simon (2025). “Gaslight to Skylight to Blue Lights” in Parr, Connal; Hopkins, Stephen, eds, Paving the Path to Peace: Civil Society and the Northern Ireland Peace Process. Peter Lang.
- Lee, Simon (2026). “Radio, The Listener and The Times: Lessons from the 1950s in the Public Understanding of Law” in Cownie, Fiona; Auchmuty, Rosemary, eds (eds), Law & Justice in the 1950s: Case Studies from a Neglected Decade, University of London Press.
