= Delahunty v Player and Wills (Ireland) Ltd. =

Irish Supreme Court case

Delahunty v Player and Wills (Ireland) Ltd
- Coat of arms of Ireland
- Court: Supreme Court of Ireland
- Decided: 2006
- Citations: Delahunty v Player and Wills (Ireland) Ltd [2006] IR 304; [2006] IESC 21

Case history
- Appealed from: High Court
- Appealed to: Supreme Court

Court membership
- Judge sitting: Fennelly J

Case opinions
- The Supreme Court upheld an action for damages against two tobacco companies in negligence and for breach of statutory duty.
- Decision by: Fennelly J

Delahunty v Player and Wills (Ireland) Ltd, [2006] 1 IR 304; [2006] IESC 21 was an Irish Supreme Court case in which the Court gave a woman permission to take action for damages against two major tobacco companies in what was the first step in the battle against 'Big tobacco'.

== Background ==
Margaret Delahunty, the Respondent, was an 80 year old woman who had been smoking since she was 12 years old, at one stage smoking up to 30 cigarettes a day. She was diagnosed with cancer 1995 and sued Player & Wills (Ireland) Ltd and Gallaher (Dublin) Ltd (the Appellants) for personal injuries allegedly caused by the cigarettes that she had smoked. The Appellants sought to have this claim dismissed on the basis that the pleadings disclosed "no reasonable cause of action or, alternatively, under the inherent jurisdiction of the court." The High Court refused to dismiss the claim.

== Holding of the Supreme Court ==
The question for the Supreme Court was whether an action for damages against the Appellants in negligence and for breach of statutory duty should be struck out on the basis that it disclosed no reasonable cause of action.

In handing down the judgement of the court, Fennelly J (with whom the other judges concurred) dismissed the tobacco manufacturing company, Gallaher (Dublin) Ltd's, appeal against the a decision made by the High Court in refusing to dismiss the Respondent's claim against the company on the grounds that there was no reasonable cause of action.

The judge noted that it had been pleaded on Ms Delahunty's behalf that she had suffered continuing injury since 1995 and that such injury was caused by smoking cigarettes manufactured by Gallaher (Dublin) Ltd. The company disputed whether this was properly pleaded. Counsel for Gallaher (Dublin) Ltd contended that Ms Delahunty had sustained her injury before she ever smoked a cigarette manufactured by this company. Fennelly J noted that Ms Delahunty was seeking to make the tobacco companies responsible for selling cigarettes that they sold, but which she voluntarily consumed.

The Court noted that:

1. A court could not possibly decide whether cigarettes "fail to provide the safety which a person is entitled to expect" as this would require a large amount of evidence and may involve a reference of the question to the European Court of Justice
2. The claim, based on liability for defective products at common law, could not be dismissed at that stage. As the Court noted: "In a situation where it has to be assumed that the product admittedly sold caused damage to the plaintiff’s health, it would require very clear authority to convince a court that it is unarguable that the manufacturer is liable. I will say no more."
3. It was sufficiently pleaded that the Respondent had suffered injuries as a result of smoking the Appellant's cigarettes after 1995.
4. Arguments of causation in this case were not decisive.

The Supreme Court agreed with the High Court decision and dismissed the appeal.
