= Walter Delahunt =

Canadian pianist

Walter Delahunt is a Canadian pianist. Born in 1956, he had his early training with the Latvian pianist Felicita Kalejs. He then continued his studies with the Swiss pianist Pierre Souvairan at the University of Toronto, where he graduated in 1978 as winner of the W. O. Forsyth award. He was engaged in 1981 at the Banff School of Fine Arts as collaborative pianist in the winter music program, a position he held for 3 years when he then took a position in Vienna at the Hochschule für Musik und darstellende Kunst. He continued private studies with György Sebők und Bruno Canino.

He has been a regular guest at several chamber music festivals including Umeå Kammarmusikfestivalen, Båstad Kammarmusikfestivalen (Sweden). Kuhmo Festival (Finland), Lockenhaus Festival, Salzburger Festspiele, he played with Martha Argerich and friends at the Bologna international music festival 2009, Progetto Martha Argerich (Lugano), Ottawa Chamber Music Festival, Scotia Festival (Canada).

He received the Andrei Sakharov Memorial medal in Russia in 1992. Particularly active as a chamber musician, he has played with Zara Nelsova, Ida Haendel, Gidon Kremer, Renaud Capucon, Gauthier Capucon, Truls Moerk and Martha Argerich. He has recorded for BBC, Panton Prague, BMG Japan and EMI Europe. He is currently on the faculty of the Frankfurt University of Music and Performing Arts and the Hochschule für Musik Detmold.

He was mentioned in the Who's Who in music for a performance of Zdzisław Wysocki's music.
