= George Delahunty =

American physiologist and endocrinologist

- Born: May 5, 1952 (age 74); Upper Darby, Pennsylvania, U.S.
- Education: Duquesne University (B.S.); Marquette University (Ph.D.)
- Spouse: Janet Holliday Dunn (m. 2010)
- Scientific career
- Fields: Physiology, endocrinology
- Workplaces: National Institute of Diabetes and Digestive and Kidney Diseases; Johns Hopkins School of Medicine; University of California, Davis; Goucher College
- Thesis: Environmental Effects on the Metabolism of Carassius Auratus: Role of the Pineal Organ and Retinal Pathways (1979)
- Doctoral advisor: Victor de Vlaming

George B. Delahunty (born May 5, 1952) is an American physiologist and endocrinologist who was a professor of biological sciences at Goucher College in Maryland from 1979 to 2019. His research examined metabolism and endocrine function in vertebrates. He also co-founded Goucher College’s post-baccalaureate premedical program.

== Early life and education ==
Delahunty was born in Upper Darby, Pennsylvania. He earned a Bachelor of Science from Duquesne University in 1974 and completed his doctorate in physiology and endocrinology at Marquette University in 1979. Under doctoral advisor Victor de Vlaming, Delahunty completed his dissertation entitled Environmental Effects on the Metabolism of Carassius Auratus: Role of the Pineal Organ and Retinal Pathways. He received a fellowship from the Arthur J. Schmitt Foundation for his final year of graduate school.

== Career ==
Delahunty joined the faculty of Goucher College in 1979 and served as professor of biology from 1991 until his retirement in 2019. He held the Lilian Welsh Professorship of Biological Sciences and served several terms as chair of the Department of Biological Sciences.

During a 1985–1986 sabbatical, he worked in the Diabetes Branch of the National Institute of Diabetes and Digestive and Kidney Diseases at the National Institutes of Health. He later served as a visiting associate professor in the Department of Gerontology at Johns Hopkins University School of Medicine and studied metabolomics at the University of California, Davis.

At Goucher, Delahunty co-founded the post-baccalaureate premedical program and helped establish the college’s public health minor. He also contributed to the college’s successful proposal for funding from the Howard Hughes Medical Institute’s undergraduate science education initiative. He retired in 2019 and became professor emeritus of biological sciences.

Delahunty's professional life extended beyond Goucher as he served as an Accreditation Evaluator for the Middle States Commission on Higher Education, an ad-hoc Reviewer for a NIH Study Section on Endocrinology, and a consultant to science programs at Liberal Arts Colleges.

== Research ==
Delahunty's research focused on vertebrate physiology, endocrinology, metabolism, and biological rhythms. His early research examined the effects of environmental factors on metabolism and endocrine function in teleost fish, particularly goldfish (Carassius auratus). His doctoral research at Marquette University investigated the role of the pineal organ and retinal pathways in regulating metabolic and endocrine rhythms in response to environmental conditions.

=== Fish physiology and metabolism ===
A major part of Delahunty's early research concerned daily and seasonal variation in carbohydrate and lipid metabolism in goldfish. His studies measured liver glycogen, liver lipids, plasma glucose, cholesterol, and other metabolic variables at different times of day and under different photoperiod and seasonal conditions. He and his collaborators found daily variation in several metabolic and hormonal parameters and examined the effects of feeding time and photoperiod on these rhythms.

Delahunty also investigated the relationship between the pineal organ, light perception, and metabolism. Experiments involving pinealectomy, retinal pathways, and controlled light-dark cycles examined how environmental light affected glucose and glycogen regulation in goldfish. His work contributed to research on the role of the teleost pineal organ in coordinating physiological responses to environmental cycles.

=== Endocrine physiology ===
Delahunty's research extended beyond metabolism to endocrine regulation in vertebrates. His work examined interactions between environmental cues, endocrine organs, and physiological processes, including the effects of light exposure on circulating estrogen levels in female goldfish. These studies considered the relative roles of retinal pathways and the pineal organ in regulating endocrine responses.

His later research shifted toward insulin-like growth factors and endocrine regulation in vertebrates. Using the African clawed frog (Xenopus laevis) as an experimental model, he investigated insulin-like growth factor I and its regulation, linking molecular and physiological approaches to the study of vertebrate endocrine function.

At Goucher College, he supervised undergraduate research projects and incorporated experimental physiology into the biology curriculum. His work was supported by grants and research funding from organizations including the National Science Foundation and the National Institutes of Health.

== Personal life ==
Delahunty met his second wife Katherine Henneberger, an economics professor while they both were teaching at Goucher College. They married circa 1990. Delahunty resides in Owings Mills, Maryland. Henneberger died in September 2006 due to lung cancer. In 2010 Delahunty married Janet Holliday Dunn, a Baltimore native. They live in Baltimore City and he is a stepfather to her three children and three grandchildren.
