= Jo Delahunty =

British judge

Professor Jo Delahunty KC
- Born: Johanne Erica Delahunty; 15 September 1963 (age 62)

Professor Johanne Erica "Jo" Delahunty, KC (born 15 September 1963) is a British barrister, judge, and legal academic. Called to the bar in 1986, she specialises in family law and child protection. She has also been a Recorder since 2009, and was the Gresham Professor of Law from 2016 to 2020.

== Early life ==
Johanne Erica Delahunty was born on 15 September 1963. Although her mother was still legally married to her father, Johanne was born in the unmarried mothers ward, Whittington Hospital, Archway, London, as her father had abandoned her mother while pregnant. She grew up living with her mother, grandmother and grandfather in East Finchley, London, and attended comprehensive schools. She was the first in her family to stay in education beyond the age of 15. She then became the first in her family to attend university, earning herself a place at St Anne's College, Oxford, to study law in 1982, and subsequently became the first 'professional' in the family.

== Career in court ==
Delahunty is one of the UK's leading family barristers, specialising in child protection law. She rose to prominence, and has won industry awards, for her work in contentious cases. In public law these involve complex medical evidence and scientific research centering on catastrophic injuries contributing to the death or serious injury to a child, child sex abuse, ritualized abuse, Factitious Induced Illness allegations and radicalisation cases. Her clients often have mental health difficulties or serious learning difficulties. Jo acts for children who have been sexually abused and face allegations of sexually abusing others.

Delahunty was called to the Bar in 1986 and, in 2006, was appointed a King's Counsel. She was appointed a Recorder in 2009 and was made a Bencher of Middle Temple in 2011.

She has received awards including: "Family Silk of 2025 Award' by Lexis Nexis; Voted 'The Lawyer You Aspire To Be' 2025 by The Family Lawyer; Finalist for the 'Outstanding Individual Contribution to D&I 2025' by Chambers and Partners; awarded the Panth Seva Medal (2024)for her contribution to Society; Winner Lexis Nexis Case of the Year 2021 for Re HN; Winner Chambers UK Bar Awards 2021 'Outstanding Contribution to Diversity & Inclusion'; Finalist Lexis Nexis Family Law Awards 2020 Family Law QC of the Year; Finalist Lexis Nexis Legal Personality of the Year 2020; Finalist Inspirational Woman in Law Barrister of the Year 2019; Finalist Legal 500 UK Awards Family Silk 2018; Legal Claims Award 2017 ‘Outstanding Achievement’*;Legal Aid Lawyer of the Year ‘Outstanding Achievement of the Year’ Award 2016*;Modern Lawyer ‘Outstanding Achievement of the Year’ Award 2016* (*Group Recipient for the Hillsborough Inquest Family Lawyers);Finalist Family Legal 500 Silk of 2014; Winner of Jordan’s Family Silk 2013;Finalist Chambers and Partners Family QC 2013

Delahunty was a member of the legal team that investigated the Hillsborough disaster and her work led to the conclusions of an inquest that the fans were not to blame and that the inaction of the South Yorkshire Ambulance Service contributed to the number of fatalities.

== Career in academia ==
Delahunty was Gresham Professor of Law from 2016 to 2020, a role that she performed alongside her full-time silk practice at 4 Paper Buildings, Temple, London. The professors of Gresham College give free public lectures, rather than teaching enrolled students. As Gresham Professor of Law, she gave a series of lectures on wide-ranging aspects of law of public interest.

She was made an Emeritus Gresham Professor of Law in 2020 and awarded a Fellowship in recognition of her contribution to the reputation and reach of the college, expanding its audience to include young men and women and those from disadvantaged and underrepresented groups .

== Honours ==
On 13 March 2019, she was granted the Freedom of the City of London as one of 100 women chosen to celebrate the centenary of the Representation of the People Act 1918.

== Recognition & Awards ==
Awards
| Awards | Year | Category | Result |
|---|---|---|---|
| Lexis Nexis Family Law Awards | 2020 | Family Law QC of the Year | Shortlist |
| Lexis Nexis Legal Awards | 2020 | Legal Personality of the Year | Finalist |
| Inspirational Women in Law | 2019 | Barrister of the Year | Finalist |
| Legal 500 UK Awards | 2018 | Family Silk | Finalist |
| Modern Claims Award | 2017 | Outstanding Achievement* | Winner |
| Legal Aid Lawyer of the Year | 2016 | Outstanding Achievement of the Year* | Winner |
| Modern Lawyer | 2016 | Outstanding Achievement of the Year* | Winner |

Group Recipient for the Hillsborough Inquest Family Lawyers*

Recognition
| Directory | Year | Ranking | Comment | Reference |
|---|---|---|---|---|
| Legal 500 | 2021 | Top Tier | "Is as captivating on her feet as she is persuasive in negotiation. She is extraordinarily tenacious, kind and brave at work, and looks for all-encompassing and human solutions for children taking properly into account the wider implications in each family's dynamic". | |
| Chambers & Partners | 2020 | Band 1 | "Jo Delahunty is a legend. She is immensely knowledgeable and very able when it comes to complex child injury cases." "A master strategist who gains the trust of clients, she knows exactly what to get out of witnesses." | |
