= Charles Holland Mason =

American lawyer

- Born: August 9, 1822; Walpole, Cheshire County, New Hampshire, United States
- Died: June 11, 1894 (aged 71); Vinita, Oklahoma Territory, United States
- Occupations: Politician, lawyer
- Title: United States Commissioner (Indian Territory)
- Term: 1890–1894
- Political party: Republican
- Spouse: Rachel L. Huckeby

Charles Holland Mason (August 9, 1822 – June 11, 1894) was a 19th-century American politician and lawyer. Mason served as United States Commissioner for the Indian Territory (now Oklahoma) from 1890 until his death.

== Early life and marriage ==
Mason was born in Walpole, New Hampshire to Joseph and Harriet (Ormsby) Mason. Mason received a thorough classical education to fit him for practicing law. Mason attended the Hancock Literary and Scientific Institute. At age twenty-one, he emigrated West, locating first at Louisville, Kentucky where he was employed as tutor in a private family, studying law between school hours with Hamilton Smith. A year later, he was admitted to the bar at Louisville. He came to Perry County, Indiana during the 1840s.

On March 20, 1852, in Cannelton, Indiana, Mason married Rachel Littell (Huckeby) Wright (1828–1883), the young widow of John G. Wright, the daughter of Joshua B. Huckeby and Rebecca Lang. The couple had no children.

== Political career ==
In 1890, Mason was appointed by president Benjamin Harrison as United States Commissioner for the Indian Territory (before the organization of Oklahoma) with headquarters at Vinita, where he died in June 1894.
