= List of Leeds Civic Trust plaques =

The following is a list of plaques placed within the City of Leeds by Leeds Civic Trust to celebrate people or historic sites.

The main ones are cast aluminium 18 inches in diameter with lettering in relief and can be repainted when badly worn. Where space is limited a 14-inch one is used with fewer words. In the case of Whitkirk Manor House (155) a rectangular one was used to get more words in the restricted width. Four (60, 62, 63, 72) are millennium plaques of 20 inches with gold letters and edging.

They are numbered according to the books given in the bibliography up to 180. 181 onwards are numbered according to the date of erection. There is one which is not numbered and green instead of blue. Some are photographed before mounting, others in situ.

There are also printed polymer ones celebrating the LGBT history in Leeds, referred to as Rainbow plaques. They were officially launched on 1 August 2018 to be on display until 17 September. Some were taken down, but some still remain as of September 2024,

== Blue Plaques ==
Number	Image	Title	Location / Notes
1		Burley Bar Stone	Entrance to Leeds Building Society, 105 Albion Street, LS1 5AS
2		Louis Le Prince	South-east corner of Leeds Bridge LS10 1NB
3		Louis Le Prince	Broadcasting Place LS2 9EN
4		Temple Mill	LS11 9YJ
5		18 Park Place	LS1 2SP
6		The Victoria Hotel	23 Great George St, LS1 3DL
7		The Assembly Rooms	Behind the Corn Exchange LS2 7DE
8		Kemplay's Academy	51 New Briggate LS2 9JE
9		Brodrick's Buildings	43-51 Cookridge Street LS2 3AW
10		The West Bar	34-38 Boar Lane LS1 5HL
11		Park Square	45 Park Square LS1 2NP
12		Leeds Manor House	Scarborough Hotel, Bishopsgate Street LS1 5DY
13		St Paul's House	Park Square, LS1 2ND
14		Leeds Charity School	Mark Lane, LS2 8JA
15		Hotel Metropole	King Street, LS1 2HQ
16		Yorkshire Penny Bank	Infirmary Street, LS1 2JP
17		William Hey's House	1 Albion Place, LS1 6JL
18		Leeds Infirmary	Great George Street, LS1 3EX
19		Leeds School of Medicine	Thoresby Place, LS2 9NL
20		Queens Court	Lower Briggate, LS1 6YL
21		Leeds & Liverpool Canal Warehouse	1 Canal Wharf, Water Lane LS11 5BB
22		Bank of England	1 South Parade, LS1 5QL
23		A. S. L. E. & F.	The Commercial Inn, Sweet Street, LS11 9TE, corner with corner of Marshall Street (not visible July 2019)
24		The Great Synagogue	Belgrave Street, LS2 8DD
25		Mill Hill Chapel and Joseph Priestley	City Square, LS1 5DQ
26		The Church Institute	9 Albion Place, LS1 6JL
27		Coloured Cloth Hall	Infirmary Street, LS2 2HT
28		Fairbairn House	71 Clarendon Road, LS2 9PJ
29		Atkinson Grimshaw	56 Cliff Road, LS6 2EZ
30		John Harrison	23 Great George St, LS1 3DL
31		White Cloth Hall	Behind the Corn Exchange, Crown Street, LS1 7RB
32		Joshua Tetley	Gatepost, Hunslet Road, LS10 1JQ
33		Ralph Thoresby, FRS	15 Kirkgate, LS1 6BY
34		Arthur Ransome	6 Ash Grove, LS6 1AY
35		Aire & Calder Navigation	Riverside Court, Call Lane, LS1 7BU
36		North-Eastern Railway Viaduct	Swinegate, LS1 4AG
37		Tower Works	Globe Road, LS11 5QU
38		Samuel Smiles	Leeds City Museum, Cookridge Street, LS2 3AD
39		Fletland Mills	42 The Calls, LS2 7EW
40		Joseph Aspdin	Packhorse Yard off Briggate, LS1 6AT
41		Yorkshire Ladies' Council of Education	18 Blenheim Terrace, LS2 9AR
42		St Aidan's Church	Roundhay Road LS8 5QD
43		East Bar	Leeds Parish Church boundary wall, Kirkgate, LS2 7DJ (Small plaque: 14 inches)
44		Sir Leonard Hutton (Cricketer)	5 Fulneck, Pudsey, LS28 8NT
45		Leeds College of Art	Vernon Street, LS2 9AQ
46		First Leeds Synagogue	Merrion Centre, LS2 8NG
47		The City Varieties	Swan Street, LS2 9AQ
48		Central Higher Grade School	2 Great George Street, LS2 8BA
49		Leeds Union Workhouse	Thackray Medical Museum, Beckett Street, LS2 7LN
50		Oakwood Clock	Corner of Roundhay Road and Princes Avenue, LS8 2HU
51		Golden Acre Park	Cafe in the park, Otley Road, LS16 8BQ
52		Leeds Burial Ground	Beckett Street, LS9 7LS
53		Leeds School Board	Calverly Street, LS1 3ED
54		Moortown Golf Club	Harrogate Road, LS11 7DB
55		Bank Mills	Rose Wharf, East Street, LS9 8EE
56		Queen's Arcade	Briggate, LS1 6LF
57		Meanwood Tannery	Millpond Road, LS6 4ED
58		Burmantofts Pottery	
59		Potternewton Mansion	Harehills Lane, LS9 7ED (plaque in poor condition)
60		Victoria Quarter	Between Briggate and Vicar Lane, LS1 6BE (Millennium plaque: 20 inches)
61		William Congreve	Bardsey Grange, Cornmill Lane, LS17 9EQ
62	no image yet	Leeds Town Hall	Calverley Street entrance, LS1 3AD (Millennium plaque: 20 inches)
63		Kirkgate Market	(former Butchers' Row) LS2 7HY (Millennium plaque: 20 inches)
64		Montague Burton	Hudson Road, LS9 7DN
65		Kirkstall Brewery	Broad Road, LS5 3RX
66		Cliff Tannery	Sugarwell Court, Meanwood Road, LS7 2DZ
67		The Philosophical Hall	33 Park Row, LS1 1LD
68		Smithfield Ironworks	90-94 North Street, LS2 7PN
69		The Grange	Beckett Park, LS6 3QX
70		Permanent House	Brown's Restaurant, The Light, The Headrow, LS1 8EQ
71		Ellen Heaton	6 Woodhouse Square, LS3 1AD
72		Leeds Civic Hall	Millennium Square, LS1 iJR (Millennium plaque: 20 inches)
73		E. J. Arnold & Son	3 Lower Briggate, LS1 4AF
74		Leeds Grammar School	Moorland Road, LS6 1AN
75		John Deakin Heaton	21 Clarendon Road, LS2 9NZ
76		Sir Berkeley Moynihan	33 Park Square, LS1 3PF
77		Samuel Ledgard	Golden Valley (former Nelson Inn), Armley Road, LS12 2LS
78		Frank Kidson	5 Hamilton Avenue, LS7 4EG
79		Mann's Patent Steam Cart & Wagon Company Ltd	Pepper Road, LS10 2RU
80		Yorkshire Patent Steam Wagon Company	Pepper Road, LS10 2RU
81		Newton House	54 Spencer Place, LS7 4BR
82		The Hunslet Engine Company	125 Jack Lane, LS10 1BJ
83		Dewhirst's and Marks & Spencer	Harper Street, LS2 7EA
84		Bardon Hill Stables	Weetwood Lane, LS16 5TX
85		Cookridge Hall	Cookridge Lane, LS16 7NL
86		Sir John Barran, MP	Joseph's Well, Hanover Walk, LS3 1AB
87		The Middleton Railway	Moor Road Station, LS10 2JQ
88		Denison Hall	Hanover Square, LS3 1BW
89		Olympia Works and Robert Blackburn	Tesco Supermarket, 361 Roundhay Road, LS8 4BU
90		Leeds and County Liberal Club	Quebecs Hotel, Quebec Street, LS1 2HA
91		The Leeds Club	3 Albion Place, LS1 6JL
92		Mount St Mary's Convent, Orphanage & School	Ellerby Road, LS9 8LA
93		Headingley Hall	5 Shire Oak Road, LS6 2DD
94		Canal Gardens	Princes Avenue, LS8 2ER
95		Dr Alister MacKenzie	The Corner House Club, 266 Lidgett Lane, LS17 6QE
96		Richard Oastler	St Peter's Square, LS9 2AH
97		John Smeaton, FRS	Towpath wall, Leeds Lock, by Royal Armouries, LS10 1LT
98		Sir Clifford Allbutt	Lyddon Hall, University of Leeds, LS2 9JT
99		Leeds General Cemetery	Gatehouse to St George's Field, off Clarendon Road, LS2 9JT
100		Whitelock's Ale House	Turks Head Yard, off Briggate, LS1 6HB
101		Richard Bentley, FRS DD	Bentley Square, LS26 8JH
102		Live at Leeds	University of Leeds Refectory, LS2 9JZ
103		The Leeds Rifles	Carlton Barracks, Carlton Green Lane, LS7 1HE
104		Leeds Co-operative Society	Gatepost to Leodis Court, LS11 5JJ
105		Leonora Cohen JP OBE	2 Claremont Villas, Clarendon Road, LS2 9NY
106		J & H McLaren's England Engine Works	100 Jack Lane, LS10 1BN
107		The Leeds Library	18 Commercial Street, LS1 6AL
108		William Turton	64 The Calls, LS2 7EF
109		Bramley Rugby Football League Football Club	The Barley Mow Inn, Town Street, LS13 3EW
110		Adelaide Neilson	Leeds Playhouse side entrance, LS2 7UP
111		BBC Radio in Leeds	Foyer, BBC Broadcasting Centre, 2 St Peter's Square, LS9 8AH
112		Stocks Hill, Bramley	By pump, Town Street, LS13 3NA
113		Albert Goldthorpe	John Charles Centre for Sport, Middleton Grove, LS11 5JD
114		Elmete Hall	Elmete Lane, LS8 2LJ
115		Gledhow Hall	Boundary wall, junction of Gledhow Lane and Gledhow Wood Road, LS8 2LJ
116		The Yorkshire College	Textile Building, University of Leeds, LS2 9JT
117		Lady Betty Hastings	Entrance to Holy Trinity Church, Boar Lane, LS1 6HW
118		Wortley Grammar School	69 Lower Wortley Road, LS12 4SL
119		Hedley Verity	4 Welton Grove, LS6 1ES
120		Isabella Ford	Adel Grange Residential Home, Adel Grange Close, LS16 8HX
121		The Mansion	Mansion Lane, LS8 2HH
122		Rawdon College	Woodlands Drive, LS19 6JZ
123		Carlton Hill Friends Meeting House	Old Broadcasting House, 160b Woodhouse Lane, LS2 9EN
124		William Astbury	189 Kirkstall Lane, LS8 3EJ
125		The Crucible of Darts	Leeds Irish Centre, York Road, LS9 9NT
126		The Leeds Oddfellows	2 Queen Square, LS2 8AF
127		Sir Charles Wilson MP	Northern School of Contemporary Dance, 98 Chapeltown Road, LS7 4BH
128		Lady Sue Ryder of Warsaw	Scarcroft Grange, Wetherby Road, LS14 3HJ
129		Ivy Benson	59 Cemetery Road, Beeston LS11
130		Central Station Hoist	Wellington Place, LS1 4AJ
131		Gertrude Maretta Paul	Bracken Edge Primary School, Newton Road, LS7 4HE
132		Salem Chapel	rear of chapel, 11-15 Hunslet Road, LS10 1JW
133		The Revd Charles Jenkinson	St John & St Barnabas Church, Belle Isle Road, LS10 3DN
134		House of Faith	21 Leopold Street, LS7 4DA
135		The Leeds Arts Club	8 Blenheim Terrace, LS2 9HZ
136		The Majestic Cinema	City Square, LS1 1PJ
137		Cottage Road Cinema	Cottage Road, LS6 4DD
138		J. R. R. Tolkien CBE	2 Darnley Road, LS16 5JF
139		The New Synagogue	Northern School of Contemporary Dance, LS7 4BH
140		The Railway Roundhouse	Wellington Road, LS12 1DR
141		The ORT Technical Engineering School	New Horizons Community School, Newton Hill Road, LS7 4JE
142		Leeds Trades Club	Leeds Media Centre, 21 Savile Mount, LS7 3HZ
143		Leeds Corn Exchange	Call Lane, LS1 7BR
144		Leeds Grand Theatre & Opera House	46 New Briggate, LS1 6NZ
145		Leeds Methodist Pioneers	Leeds Playhouse, Quarry Hill, LS2 7UP
146		Headingley Rugby Ground	Headingley Lane, LS16 5PS
147		Weetwood Hall	Otley Road, LS16 5PS
148		Gipton Board School	Shine, Harehills Road, LS8 5HS
149		Beryl Burton OBE	Beryl Burton Gardens, Queen Street, LS27 9BU
150		Crown Point Printing Works	Leeds City College Printworks, Hunslet Road, LS10 1JY
151		John Fowler	Costco Car park, Leathley Road, LS10 1BG
152		Barnbow Royal Ordnance Factory	Former factory gates, Austhorpe Road, LS15 1 BF
153		Mary Gawthorpe	9 Warrel's Mount, LS13 3NU
154		The South Bar	South end of Leeds Bridge, LS10 1NB
155		Whitkirk Manor House	Colton Road, LS15 9AA
156		Leeds Civic Trust	17-19 Wharf Street, LS2 7EQ
157		Chapel Allerton Hall	Gledhow Lane, LS7 4NP
158		Thomas Edward Harvey	5 Grosvenor Terrace, LS6 2DY
159		Hepper House	174 East Parade, LS1 2BH
160		The New Penny	57-59 Call Lane, LS1 2BH
161		Herbert Sutcliffe & Sir Leonard Hutton	Pudsey St Lawrence Cricket Ground, Tofts Road, LS28 7SQ
162		St Michael's College	The Court, Clarendon Quarter, St John's Road, LS3 1EX
163		Kenneth Armitage	Mandela Gardens, Millennium Square, LS2 3AD
164		North Bar	The Old Red Bus Station, 101 Vicar Lane, LS2 7NL
165		Benjamin Gott	Gotts Park Golf Club, LS12 2QX
166		William Gascoigne	Patel Store, Town Street, LS10 3PN
167		Agnes Logan Stewart	Bridge Community Church, Rider Street, LS9 7BQ
168		Maurice Ellis FRSC	Leeds General Infirmary, Gatepost of main George Street entrance, LS1 3EX
169		Marshall's Mill	Marshall Street, LS11 9YJ
170		Titus Salt	91 Queen Street, L27 8EF
171		Charles Barker Howdill	14 Hanover Square, LS3 1AP
172		Alice Bacon MP	Inside Leeds Corn Exchange, Call Lane, LS1 7BR
173		Albert Johanneson	Entrance to East Stand, LS11 OES
174		Catherine Mawer	Starbucks, 48 Albion Street, LS1 6AB
175		The Mawer Group	30 Park Place, LS1 2SP
176		Holbeck Working Men's Club	HWMC, Jenkin's Lawn, LS11 9QX
177		R. A. H. Livett OBE	73 Wykebeck Valley Road, LS9 6PB (not as stated in "Blue Plaques of Leeds The Next Collection)
178		Morley Town Hall	Queen Street, LS27 9DY
179		Keith Waterhouse	Hunslet Library, Waterloo Street, LS10 2NS
180		Jim Bullock OBE	Bowers Row Chapel, Bowers Row, LS26 8DF
181		Dr Edith Mary Pechey	8 Park Square, LS2 1LH 26 July 2021
182		Percy "Don" Robins	St. George's Crypt LS1 3BR 10 September 2021
183		Selig Brodetsky	3 Grosvenor Road LS6 2DZ 10 October 2021
184		Fanny Passavant	Great Hall, University of Leeds 30 November 2021
185		Esther Simpson OBE	Esther Simpson Building Leeds University 8 March 2022
186		David Oluwale	Leeds Bridge 25 April 2022, removed and missing the same evening, replaced 23 October 2022
187		Alice Scatcherd	Park House, 51b Queen St, Morley, LS27 8EB
188	No image yet	Fanny Waterman	Unveiled on 29 March 2023 and will be erected on the entrance to Leeds Town Hall. It is the first of these plaques to include information in Braille
189		June Hancock	Gable End Salisbury View, LS12 2AU
190		Bramley Baths	Broad Lane, Bramley, LS13 3DF
191		Pablo Fanque	The Core shopping centre, Lands Lane, The Headrow
192		50th Anniversary of The first National Transvestism & Transexualism Conference	Leeds Student Union Building
193		Duncan Dallas and Elizabeth Brice	8 Regent Street, Chapel Allerton
194		Philip Naviasky	579 Scotthall Road Leeds LS7 2NF.
195		Joseph Whitwell	Hollybush Conservation Centre Broad Lane, Leeds LS5 3BP
196		Norman Victor Watson, Chairman of Waddingtons, the first UK person to play Monopoly	Layton Grange, Horsforth LS18 5EU
197		The Duchess	(Former Duchess of York Pub, now Hugo Boss) 71 Vicar Lane, Leeds, LS1 6QA
198		The Battle of Holbeck Moor	Holbeck Moor, Holbeck, Leeds, West Yorkshire LS11 9QL
199		Abolitionists in Leeds	Lyddon Hall, University of Leeds
200		Nadine Senior	Northern School of Contemporary Dance
201		The Northern Star	Briggate
202		Professor Patrick Nuttgens CBE	Leeds Beckett University

== Unnumbered Plaque ==
Number	Image	Title	Location . Notes
		George Edwin Ellison	By front entrance of Leeds City Station

== Rainbow plaques ==
Number	Image	Title	Location / Notes
1		The Grove	The Grove Inn, Back Row, Leeds
2		Charlie's Nightclub	Queen's Court, Briggate
3		Sykes and Raynor	The Regent, Kirkgate
4		Mill Hill Chapel	Mill Hill Chapel, City Square
5		Cyril Livingstone	Hotel Chocolat, 20 Albion Place, Leeds LS1 6JS
6		My Sex - Our Dance: DV8 Physical Theatre	Yorkshire Dance, St Peter's Square, Leeds
7		Angela Morley	BBC building, St Peter's Square, Leeds
8		Alan Bennett	Leeds Playhouse
10		Swarthmore Centre / Committee for Homosexual Equality	Swarthmore Centre, Woodhouse Square, Leeds LS3 1AD
11		Soft Cell	Woodhouse Building of Leeds Beckett University, Woodhouse Lane
12		Nicola Adams	wall of First Direct Arena
13		'Transvestism and Transsexualism in Modern Society'	Parkinson Building, University of Leeds
14		Section 28	door of Leeds Central Library, on Centenary Square
15		Polari	City Varieties Theatre. Swan Street,

== Bibliography ==
- Dyson, Peter; Grady, Kevin (2001). Blue Plaques of Leeds. Leeds: Leeds Civic Trust. ISBN 0905671228.
- Grady, Kevin; Tyrrell, Robert (2020). Blue Plaques of Leeds The Next Collection. Leeds: Leeds Civic Trust. ISBN 978-0-905671-99-4.
- "The Rainbow Plaque Trail" (PDF). Leeds Civic Trust.
