= Bent (magazine) =

Free magazine for gay men in the United Kingdom

- Editor: Gordon Hopps
- Categories: Gay
- Frequency: Monthly
- First issue: October 2004
- Company: APN UK
- Country: United Kingdom
- Based in: Leeds
- Language: English
- Website: mag.bent.com
- ISSN: 1742-3031

Bent was a free magazine for gay men and was distributed to 400 gay bars, clubs and saunas around the United Kingdom. Published monthly by All Points North UK in Leeds, it largely focused on entertainment, celebrities, film, DVD and music as well as television, comedy and scene news. As of August 2026, the Bent magazine web site has ceased to exist.

== Description ==
Bent's editor was Gordon Hopps; his involvement with the magazine began in the late 1980s when its earliest incarnation, All Points North, was launched. Since then, the magazine has undergone many changes. It was relaunched in the mid-1990s as North of Watford (NOW) but the logo was challenged by IPC Media who also have a title called NOW. After a number of years, and to prevent a costly court case, North Of Watford underwent another format change and became Bent. Hopps had been involved in all areas of the magazine at different times being Editor in Chief at all the major changes.

Regular columnists Adam Lowe and Simon Savidge provided the main body of features. Features editor Adam 'Beyonce' Lowe conducted celebrity interviews, wrote the music reviews and the "Beauty & the Freaks" column. Simon Savidge was the London Editor whose interviewing technique garnered a host of new fans to his work. He was also the author of Simon Says, the problem page with a witty edge. Terry George, was the magazine's publisher, who also wrote a column in Bent.

At its peak the circulation reached 60,000 copies (equal to that of Gay Times) and perhaps as high as 100,000 copies across the UK. This reflected a circulation of 1–1.7% of the entire UK population and up to 10–17% of the LGBT community. Estimated readership was said to be 150,000 in the magazine's online media pack.

Big-name cover stars and non-traditional subject matter saw Bent's popularity rise, particularly with its often striking covers that tended to feature minimal text and attention-grabbing images. The magazine acquired a slightly different and 'greener' look when it began to get its paper from a sustainable source.

As a gay lifestyle magazine Bent also carried items on fitness, beauty, travel, health advice, gadgets and fashion but also included features, interviews with up-and-coming porn stars and illustrated erotic short stories. As a free sheet, advertising provided the revenue for the production and distribution of the magazine. It was also available on subscription for a charge and could be downloaded online for free.
