= Leeds Pride =

Annual LGBT event in Leeds, England

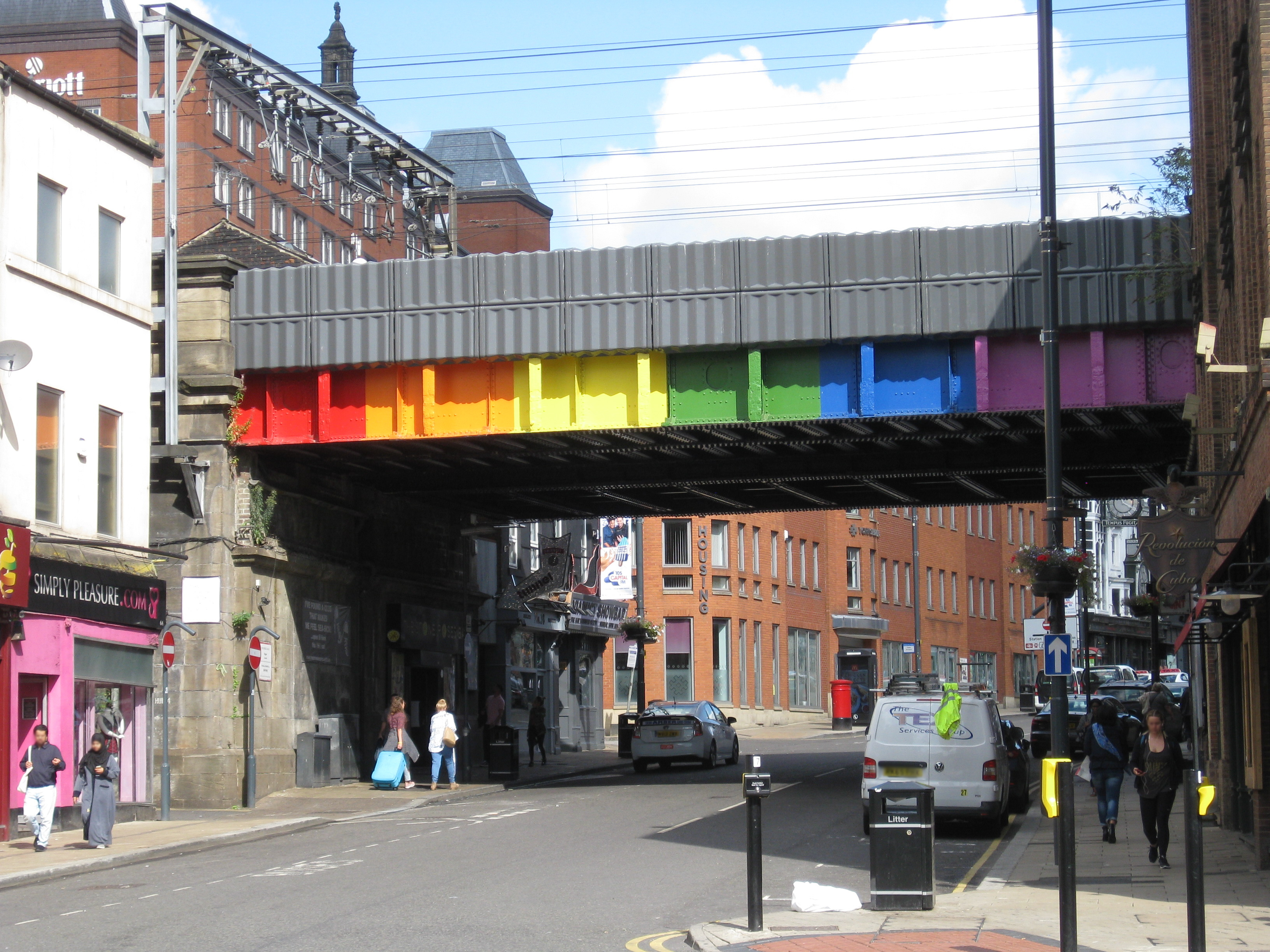
- Freedom Bridge over Lower Briggate during the 2018 event
- Date: Sunday 18 July 2027
- Begins: 10.30 am
- Ends: 10 pm
- Frequency: Annually
- Locations: Leeds, England
- Inaugurated: 2006
- Participants: Over 90,000 (2026)

Leeds Pride is an annual LGBT Pride celebration held in the city of Leeds, West Yorkshire, England. Leeds Pride is one of the biggest free pride events in the UK.

== History ==
Leeds Pride first took place in August 2006 (then called Leeds Gay Pride) although there had been previous Pride events in Leeds, such as Hyde Out in 2000 and in the few years before the first Leeds Pride, an informal picnic on Woodhouse Moor. Leeds Pride was supported by the city council and local business with 6,500 attending. In 2009 the numbers attending the event had almost doubled, to 12000, with over 1,000 participating in the parade. In its tenth year (2016) the name had changed to Leeds Pride and it had over 40,000 people in attendance, with the figure expected to grow in year on year.

The 2023 Leeds Pride took place on Sunday 6 August with 175 organisations taking part in the parade, and over 75,000 people in attendance, making it the biggest Leeds Pride ever.

A 2024 policy change caused controversy after the organisation changed their parade guidance to include comments about “specific individuals, beliefs, or political opinions are strictly forbidden". Breaking of this rule could lead to removal from the parade. The activist group Dirty Dykes made a public statement on their Instagram explaining that they wouldn't be attending the event in 2024 due to this policy change. The parade policy was subsequently changed, but Dirty Dykes pointed out this only occurred after parade applications had already closed.

== Parade ==
The parade starts at Millennium Square at around 2.00 pm finishing on Lower Briggate by The Calls with a huge party. The economic impact to the city centre of Leeds is approximately £3.8 million.

Buildings on the parade route often have temporary decorations in the colours of the Rainbow flag. In 2017, the railway viaduct over Lower Briggate was painted in these colours and named 'Freedom Bridge" by Leeds City Council and Network Rail. Steps going up to the station are also painted in the same colours as is a telephone box (an aql wi-fi hub, close to their headquarters) on Bridge End.

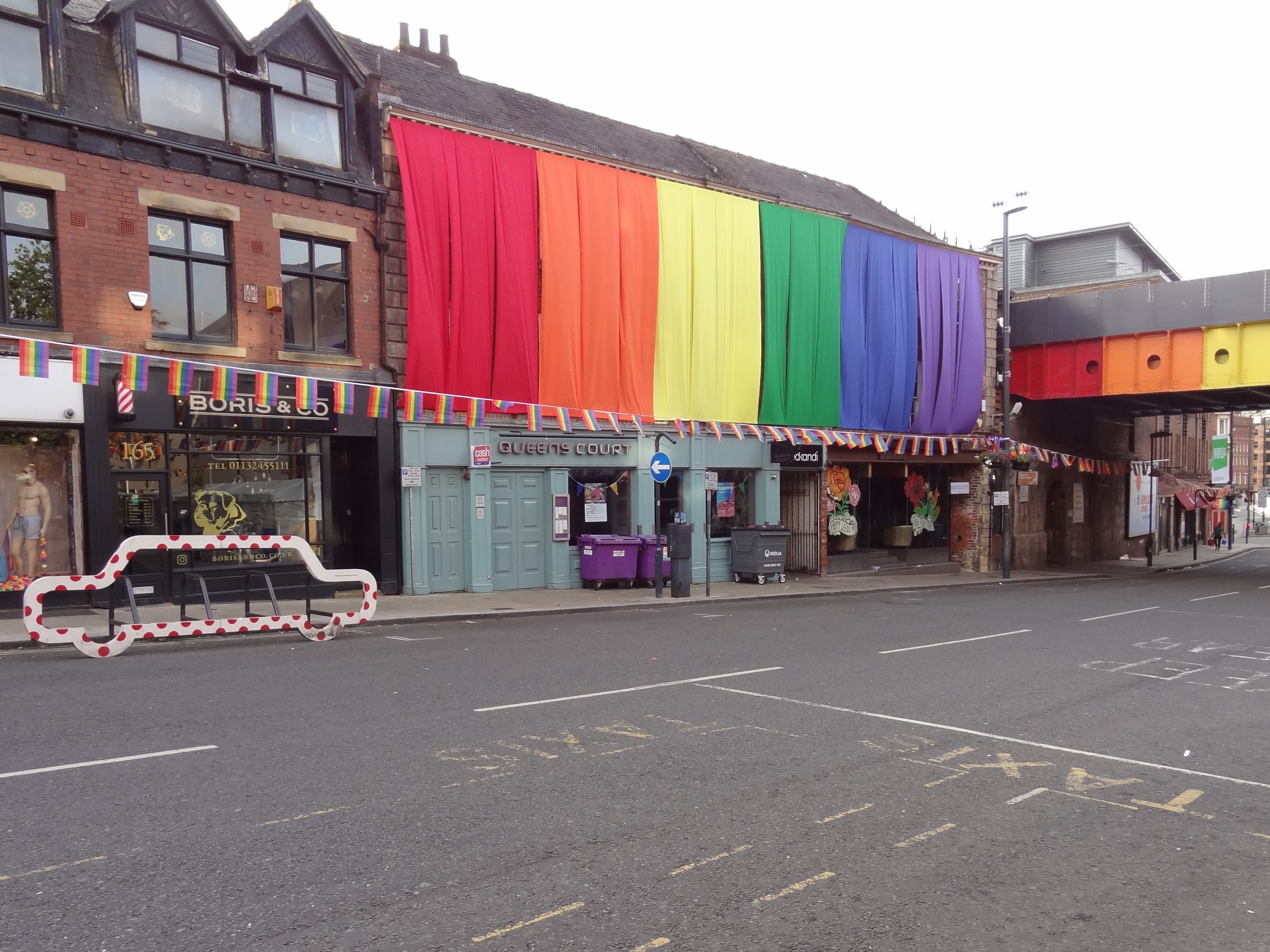
Temporary decoration for the 2018 parade

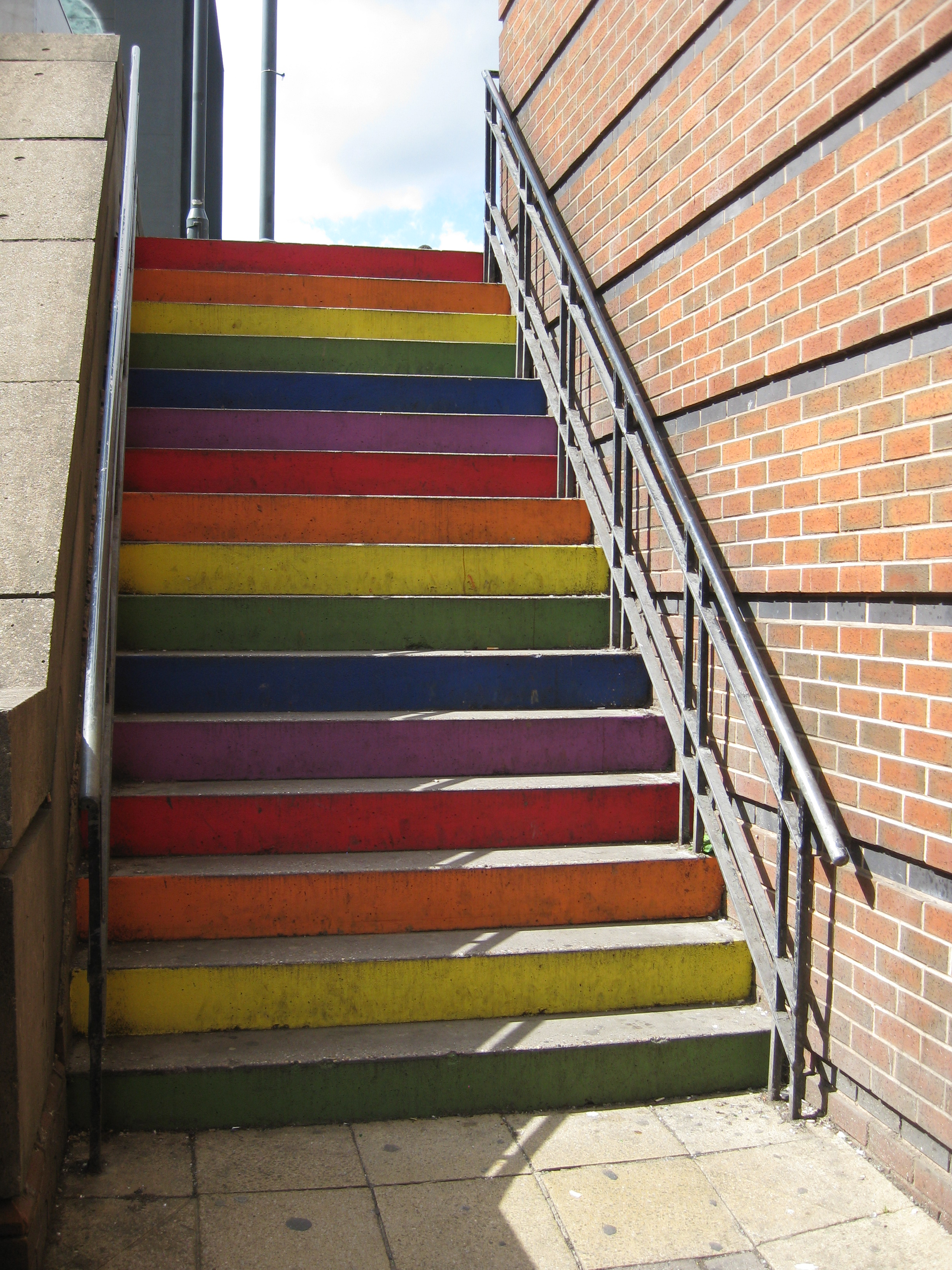
Steps up towards the station

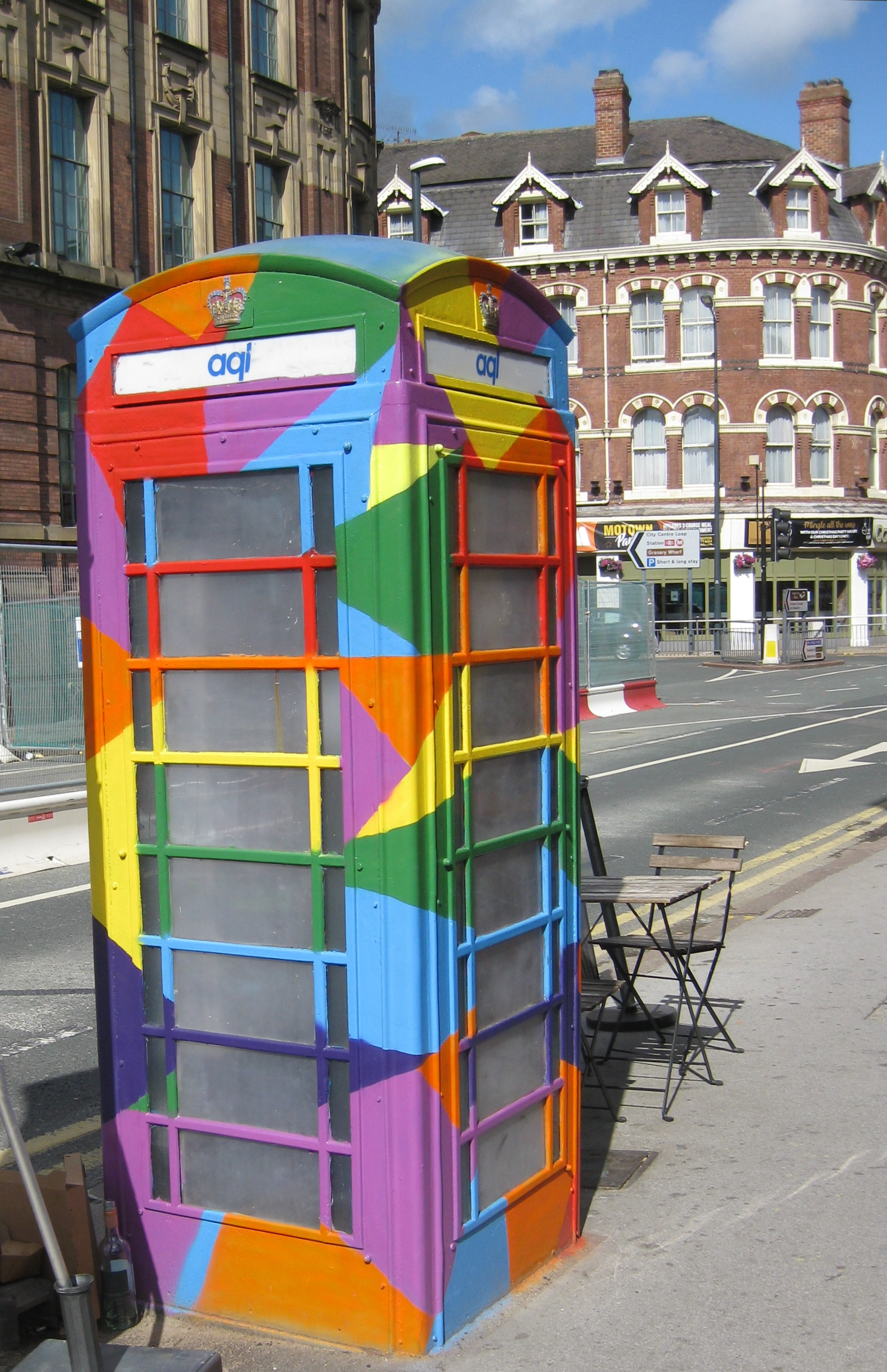
Telephone kiosk on Bridge End

== Rainbow plaques ==
In association with the 2018 event, Leeds Civic Trust announced that it would be expanding its blue plaque scheme to create a trail of Rainbow Plaques to commemorate those who have contributed to the LGBT+ story of Leeds. A map has been published showing the location of 15 plaques.

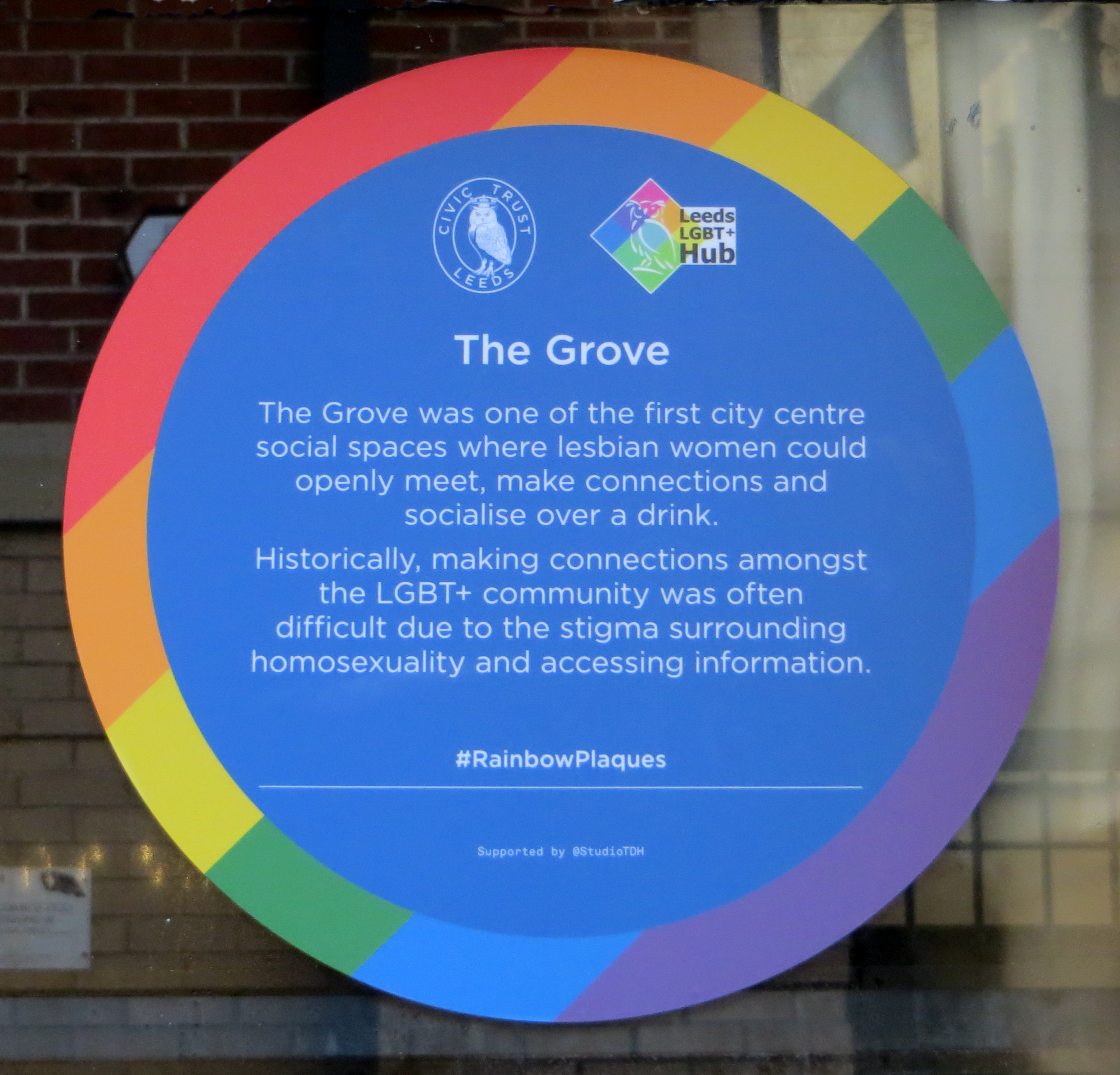
Plaque 1 on the Grove Inn, Back Row

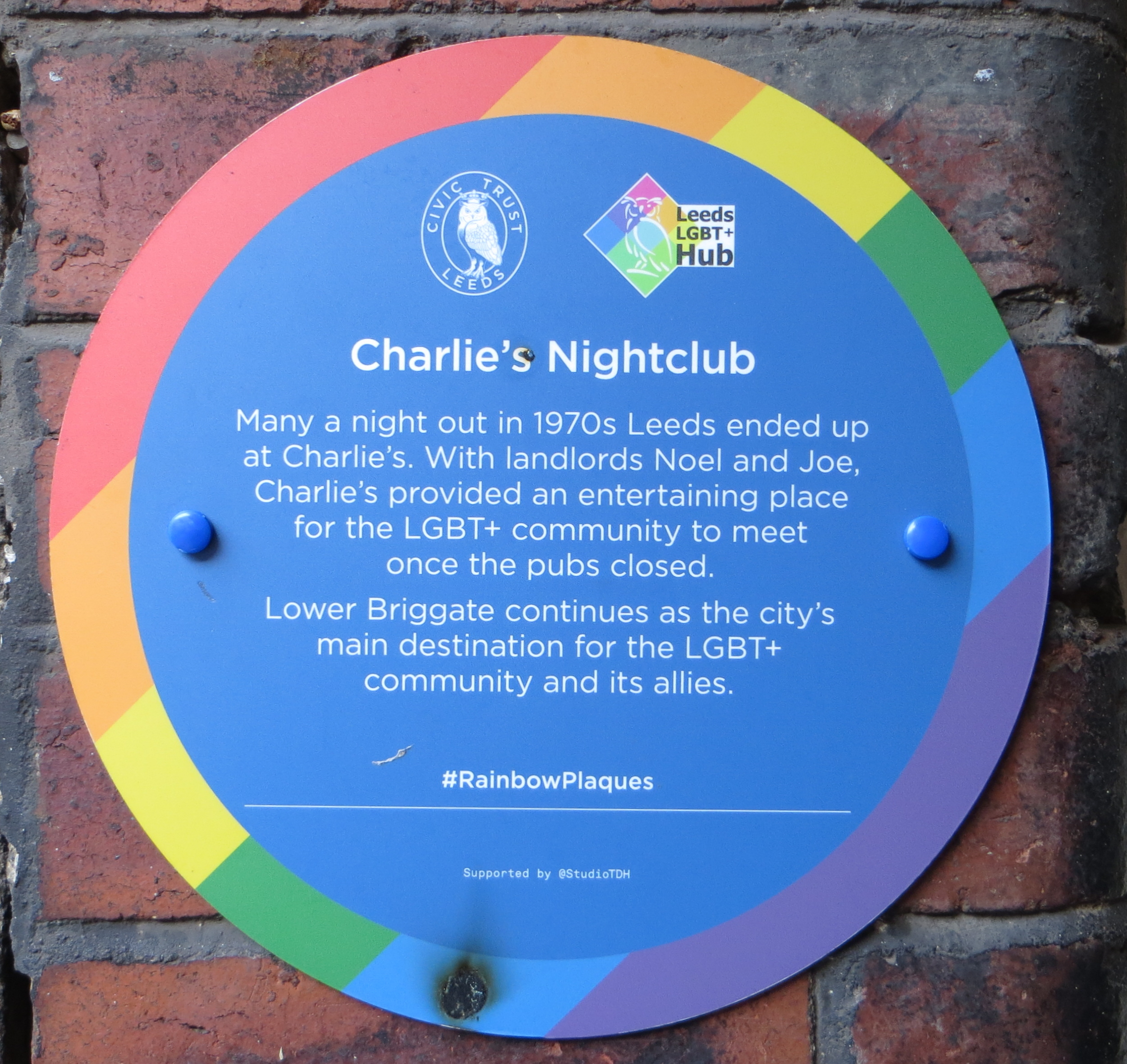
Plaque 2 on Queen's Court, Briggate

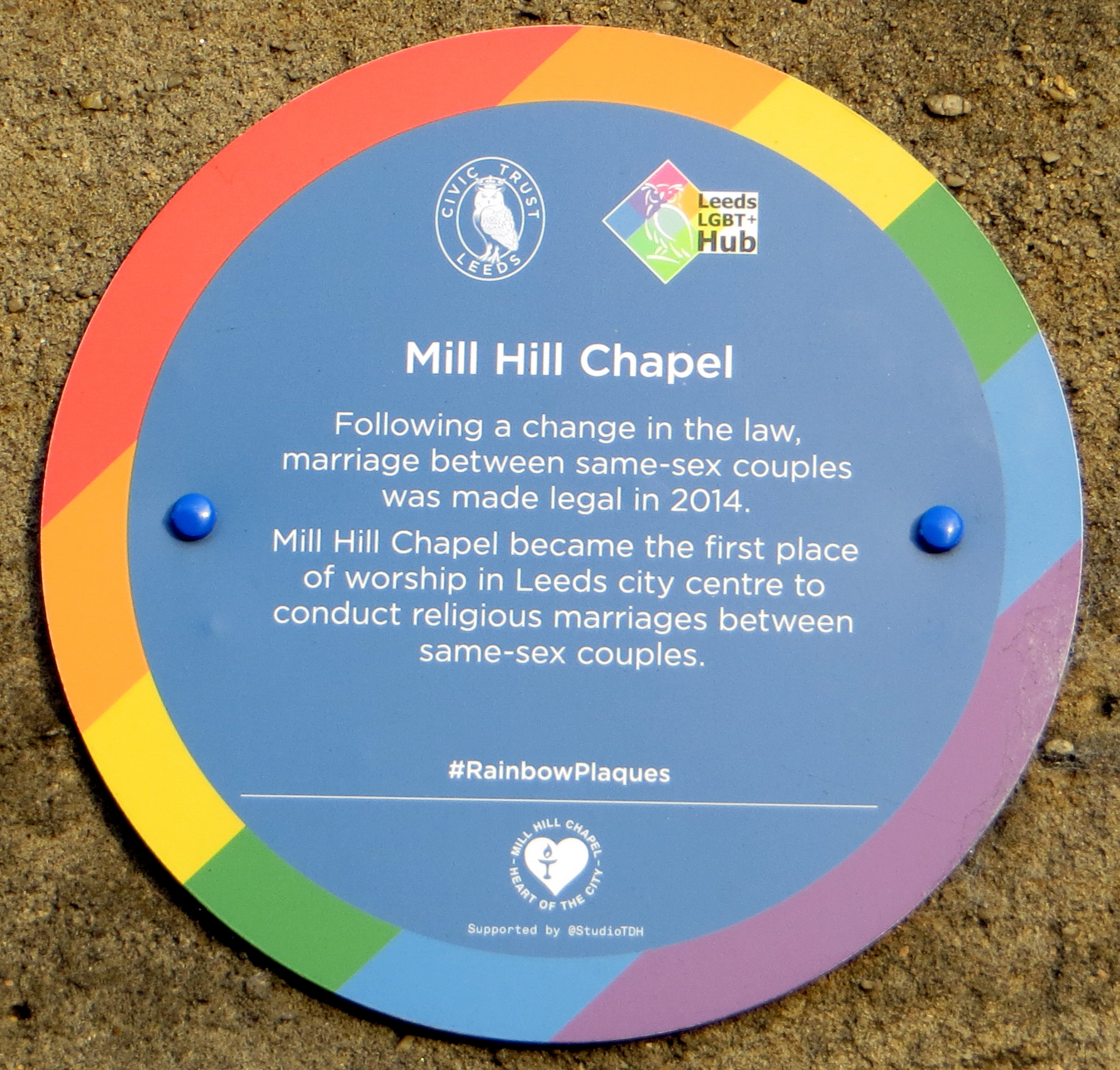
Plaque 4 on Mill Hill Unitarian Chapel

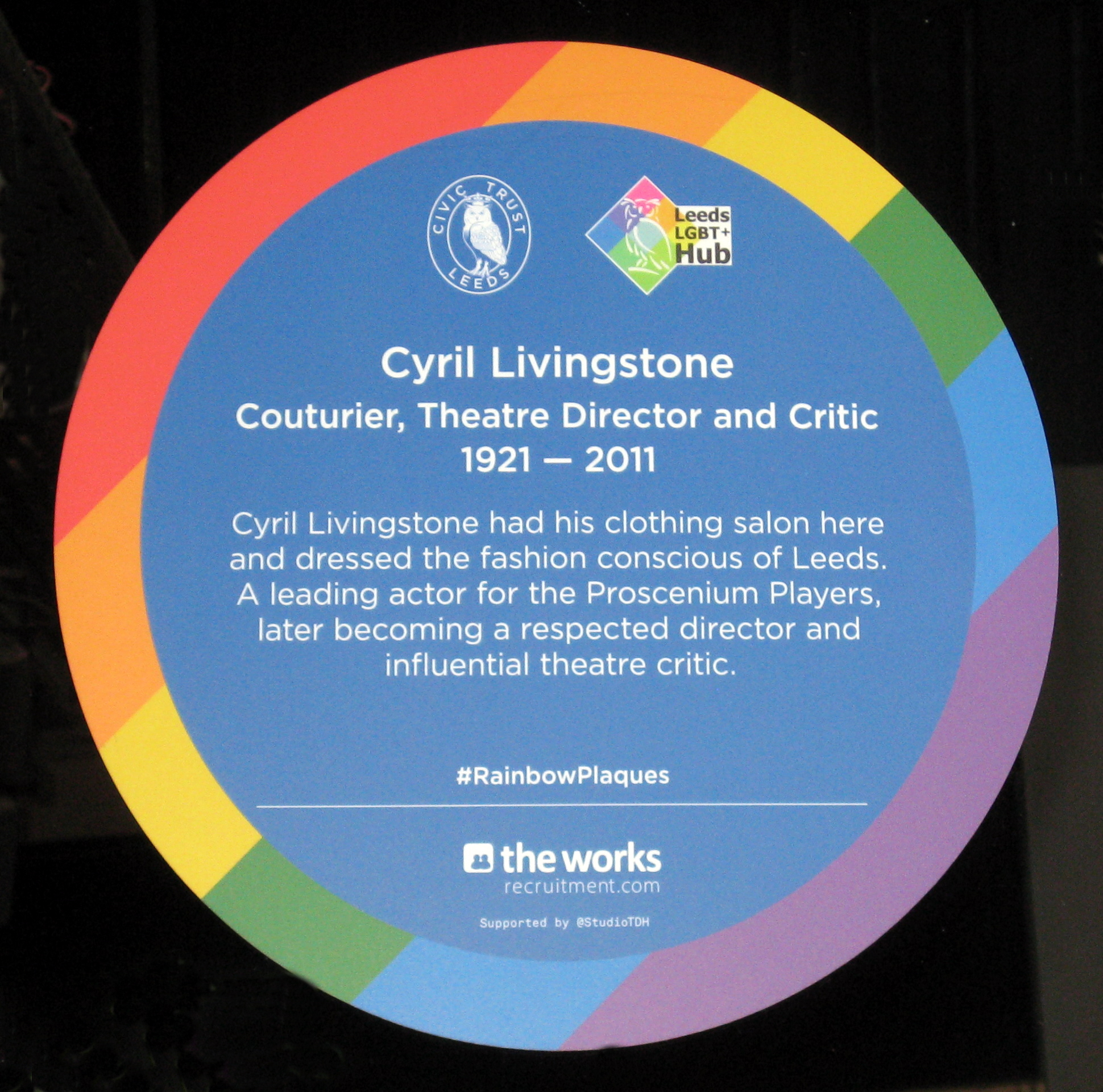
Plaque 5 on Hotel Chocolat, Albion Place

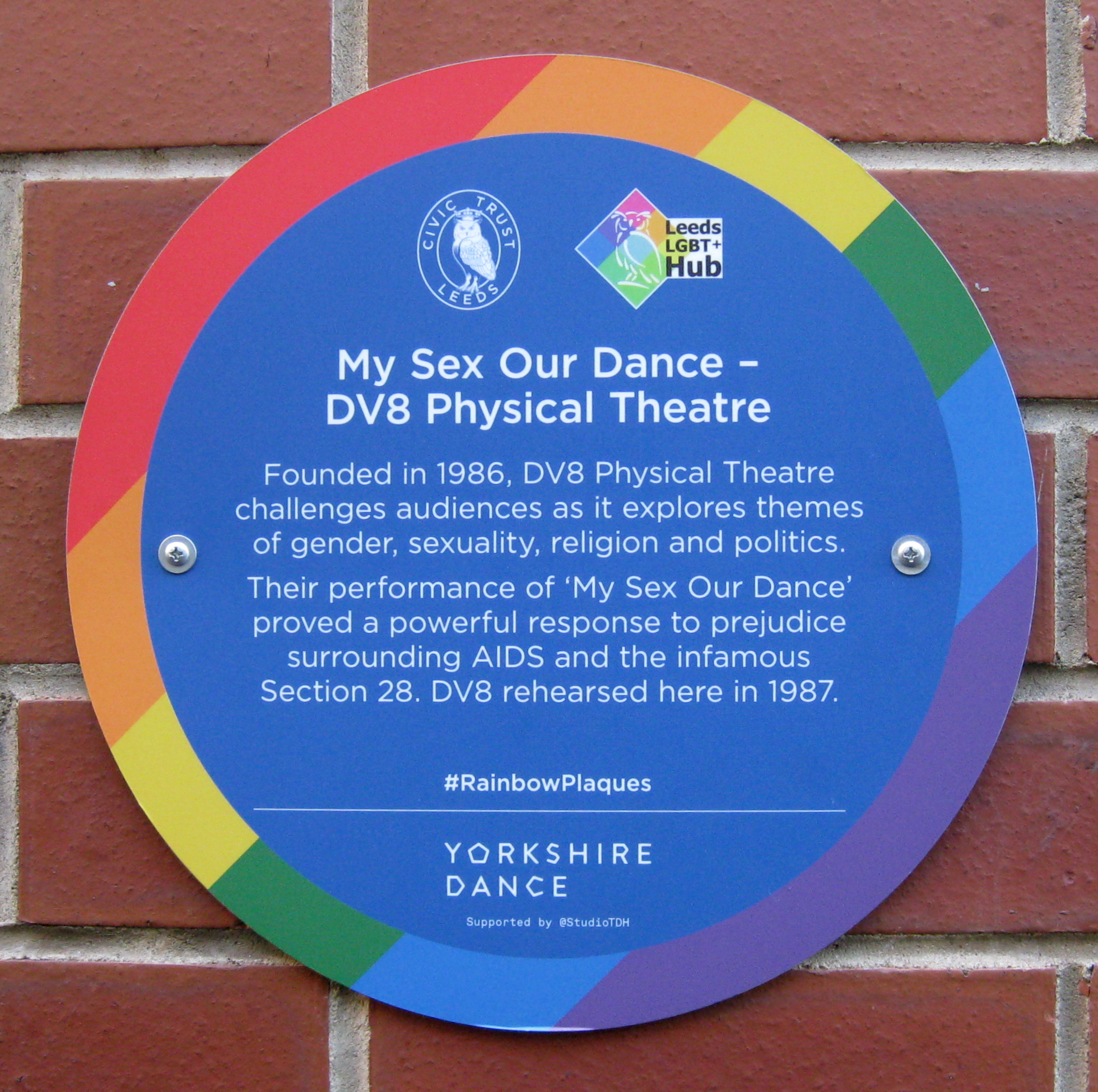
Plaque 6 on the wall of Yorkshire Dance, St Peter's Square

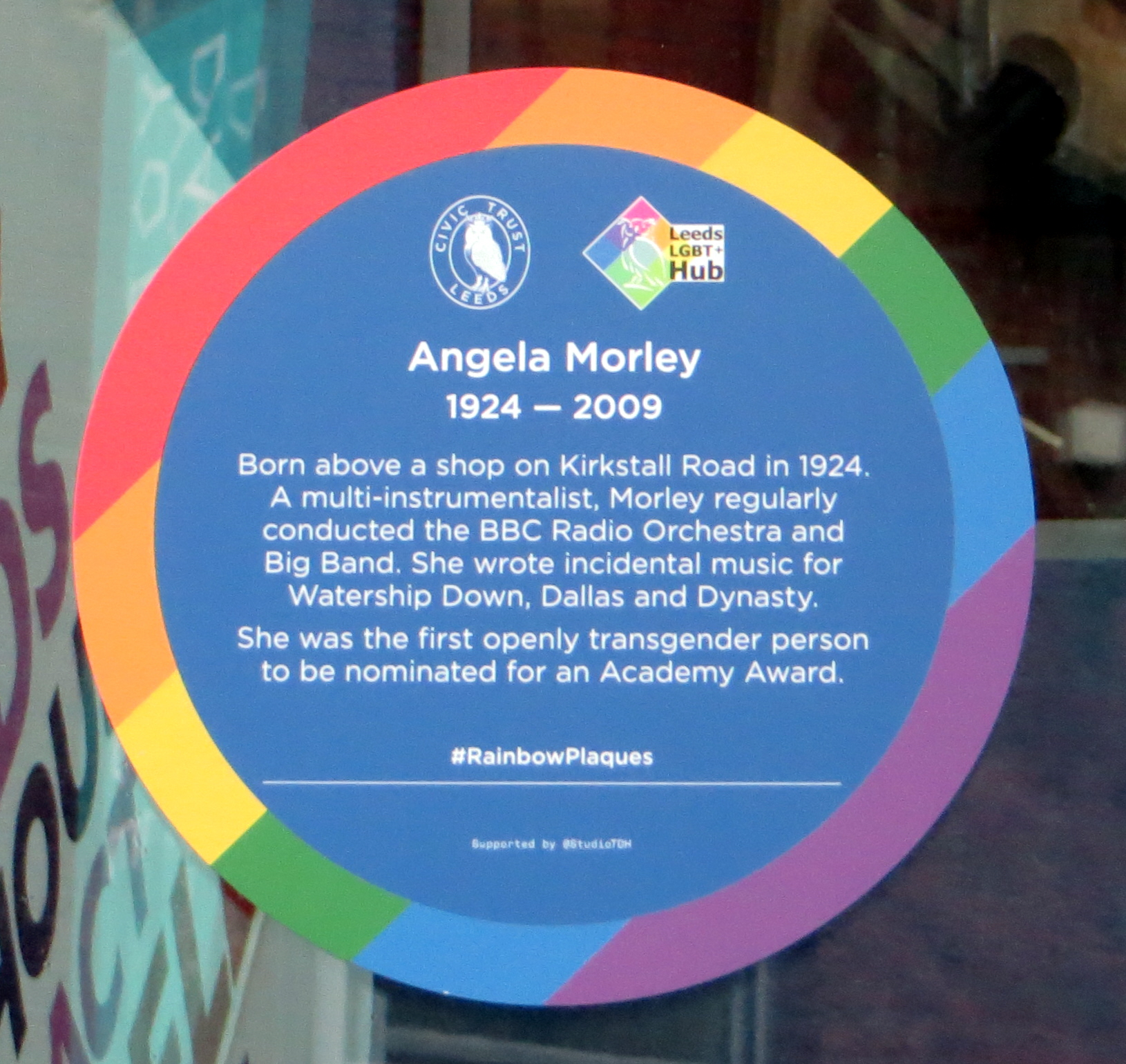
Plaque 7 on the BBC building, St Peter's Square

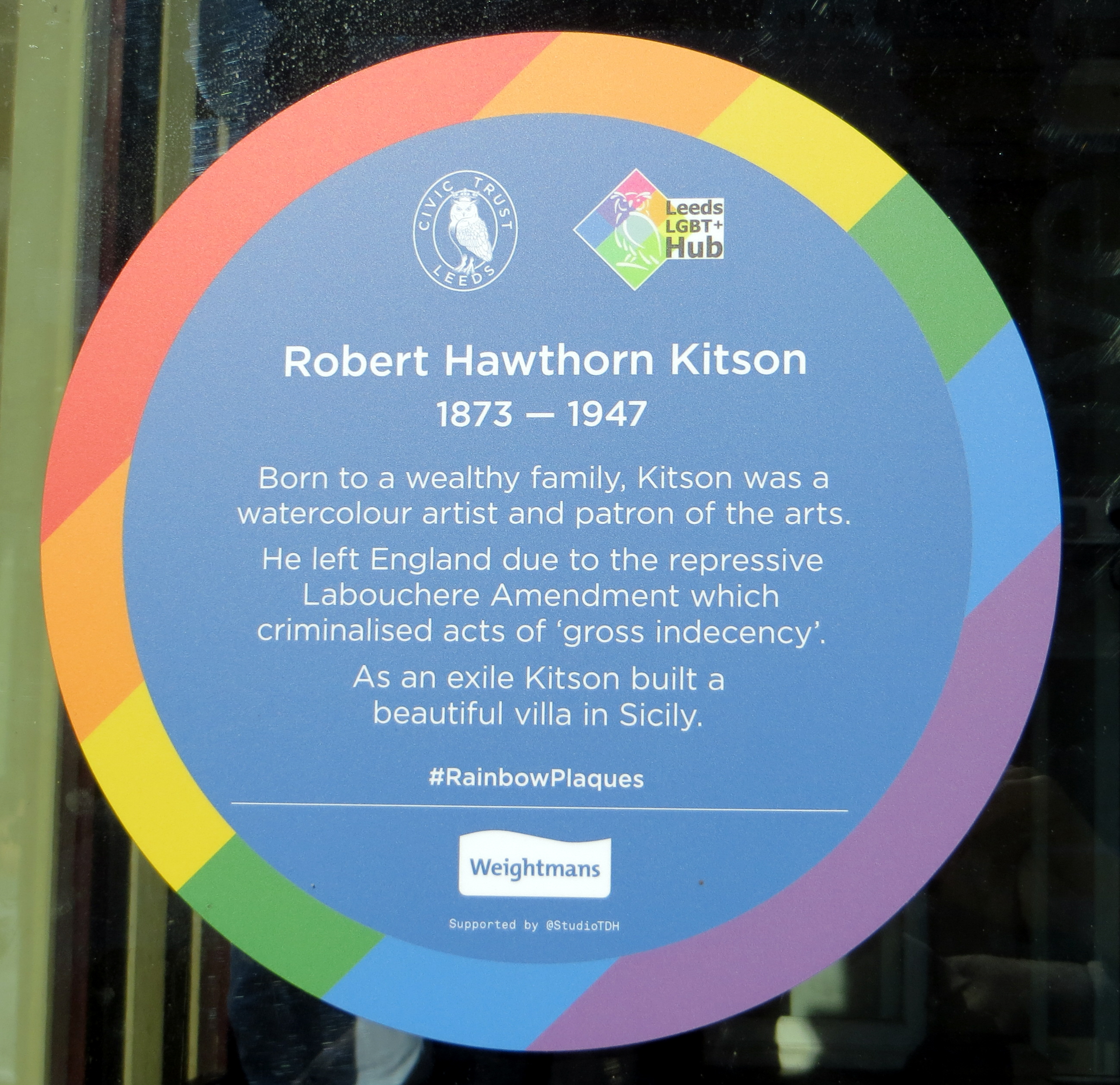
Plaque 9 in the entrance to Leeds City Art Gallery

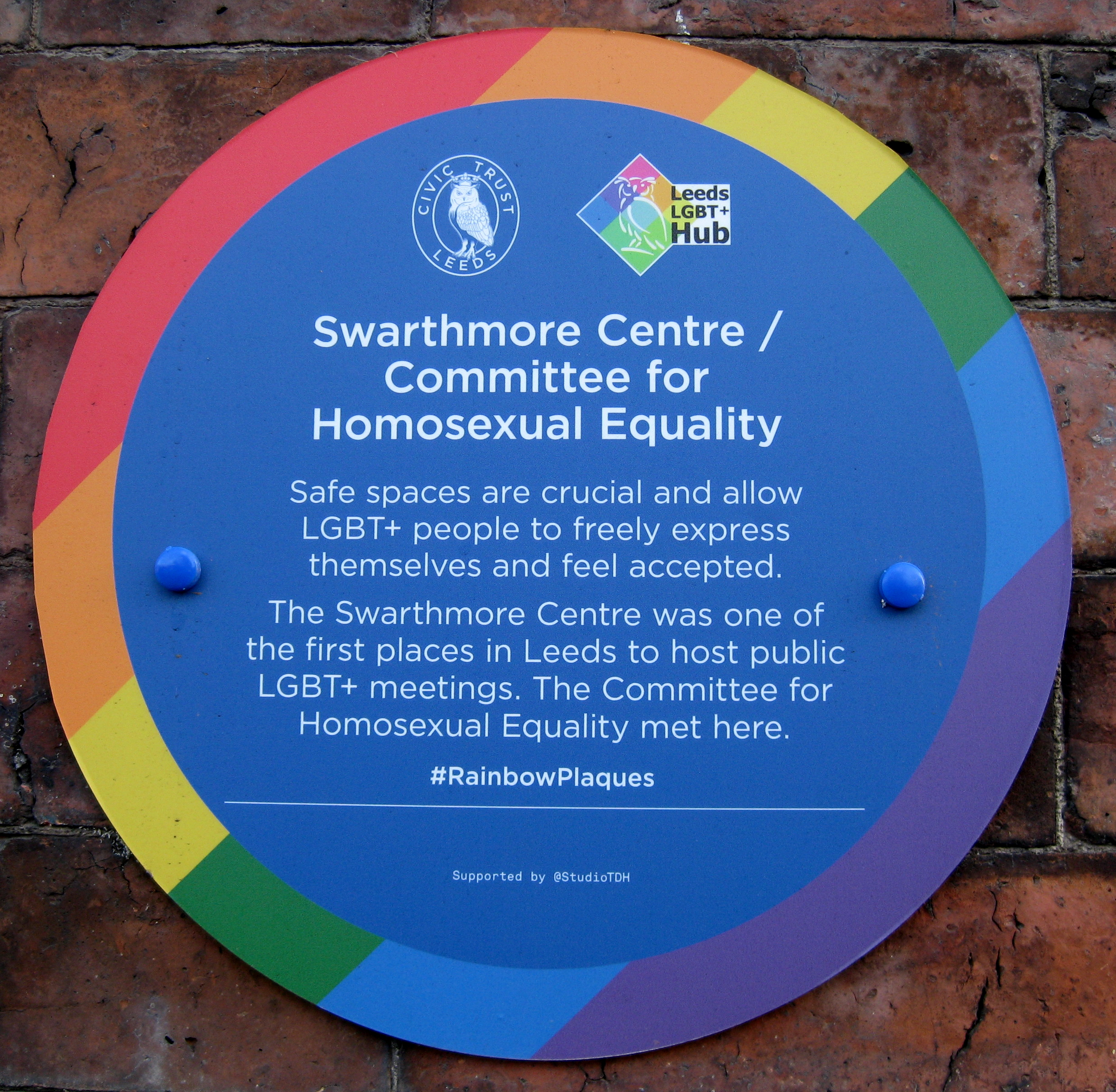
Plaque 10 on the Swarthmore Centre, Woodhouse Square

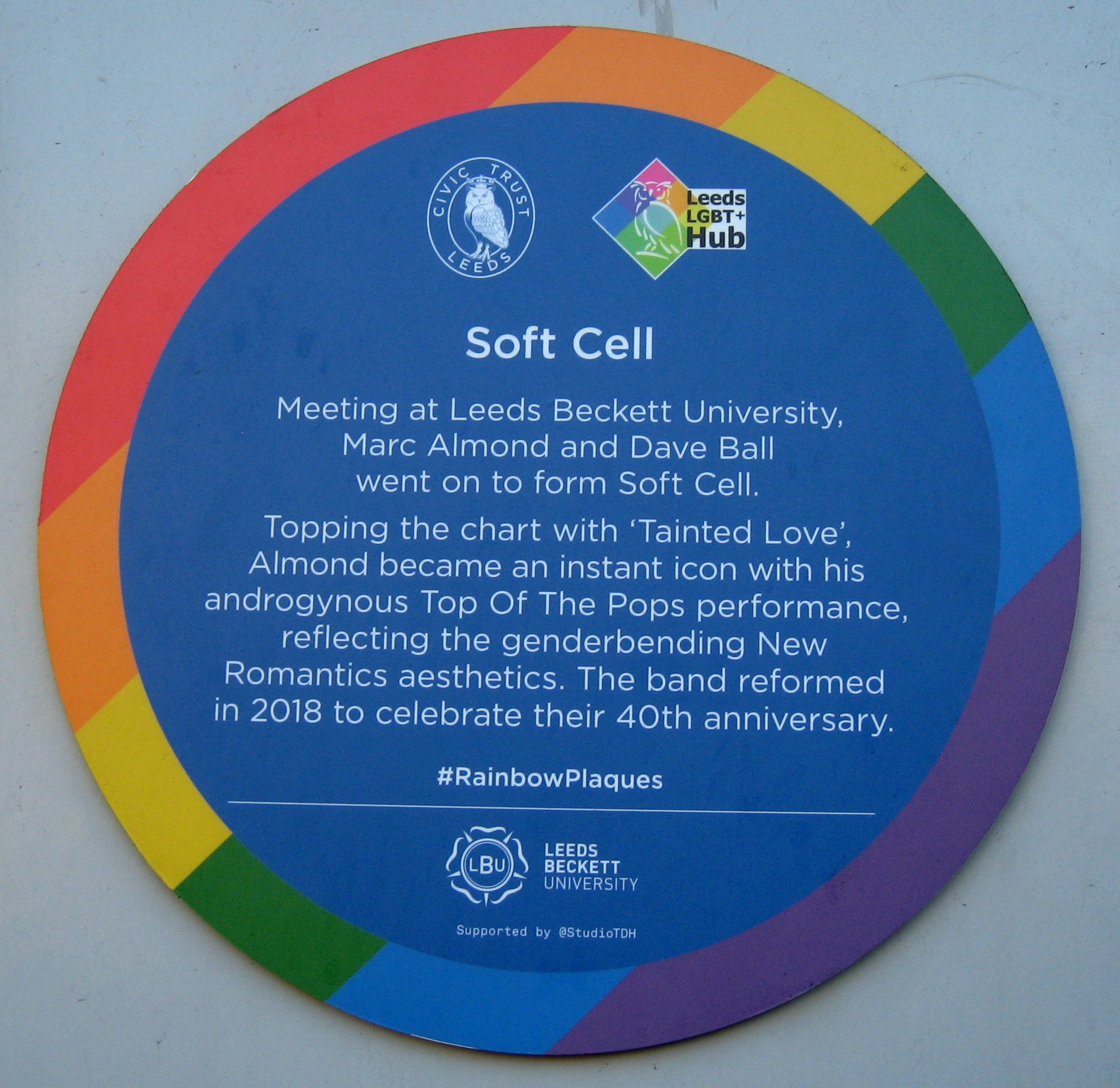
Plaque 11 on Leeds Beckett University Student Union building

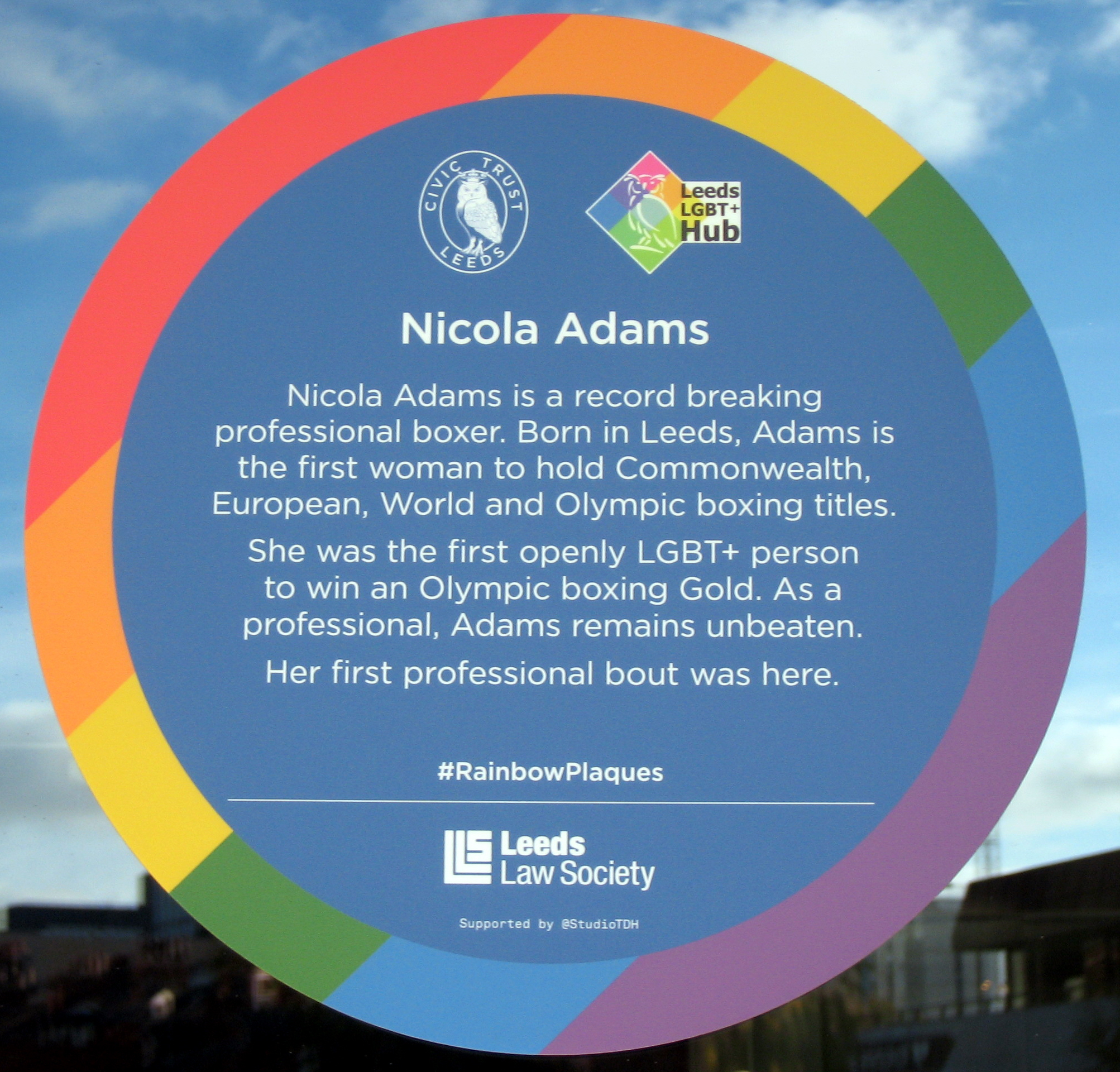
Plaque 12 on First Direct Arena

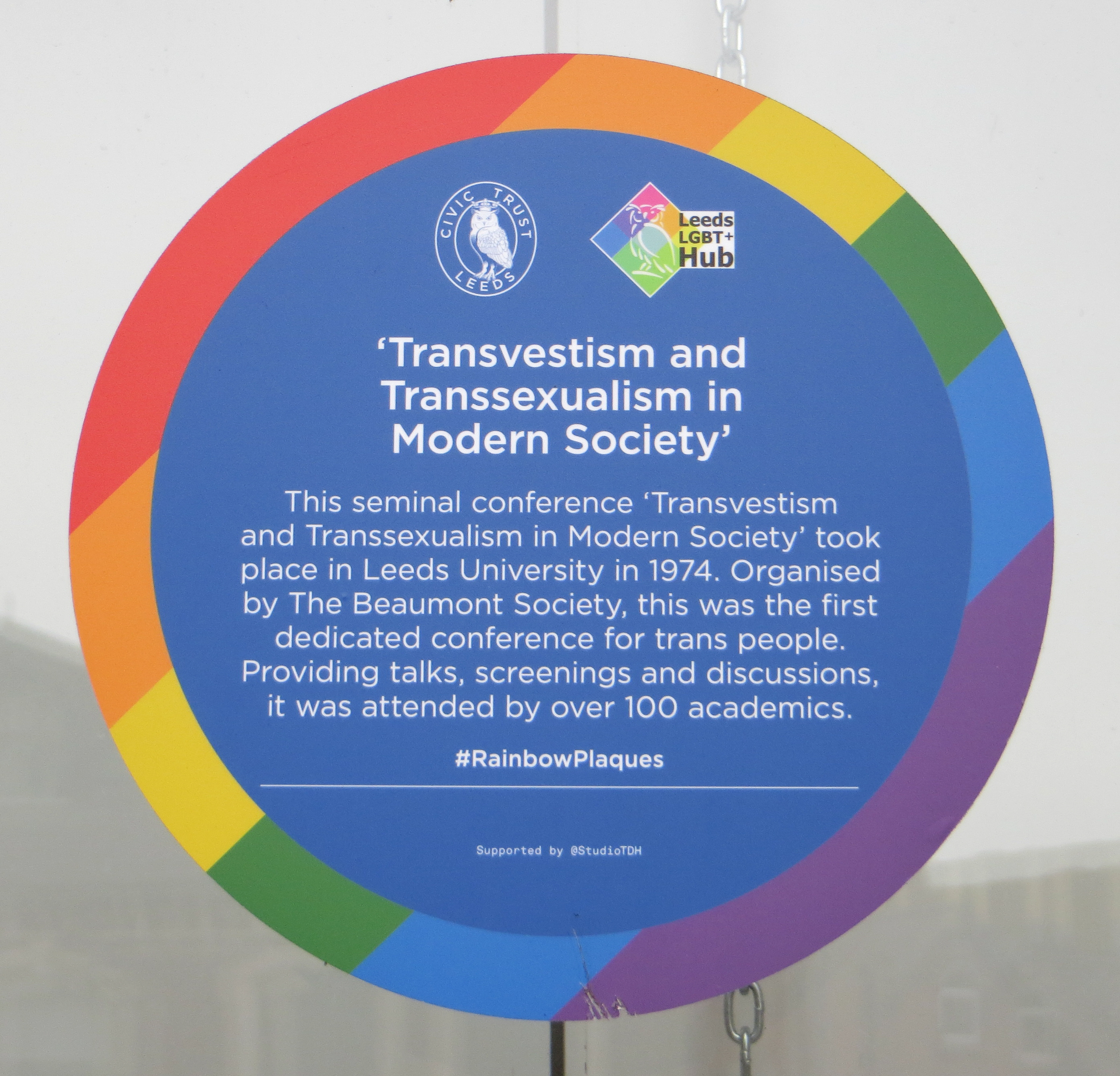
Plaque 13 on the Parkinson Building, University of Leeds

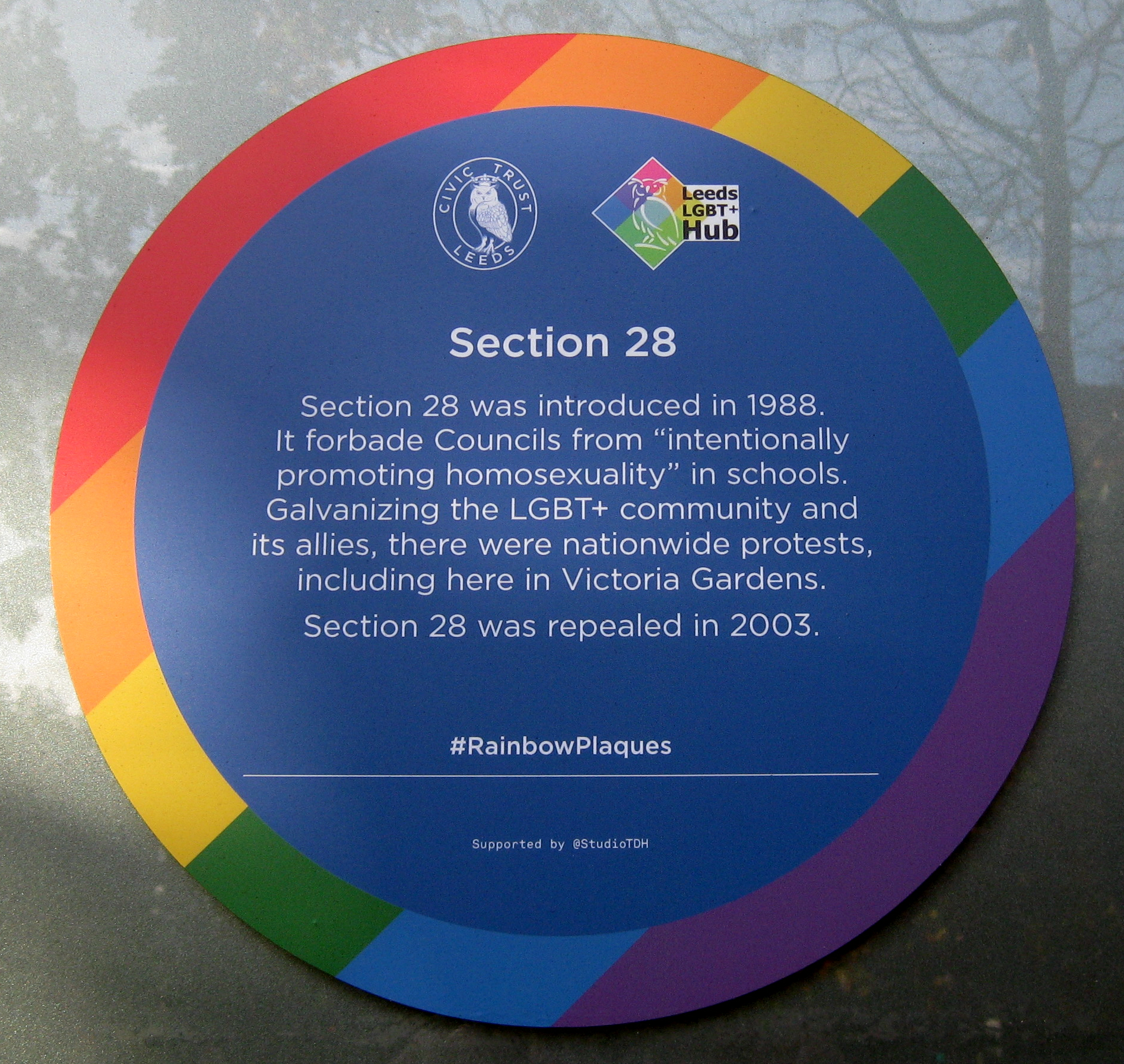
Plaque 14 on Leeds Central Library

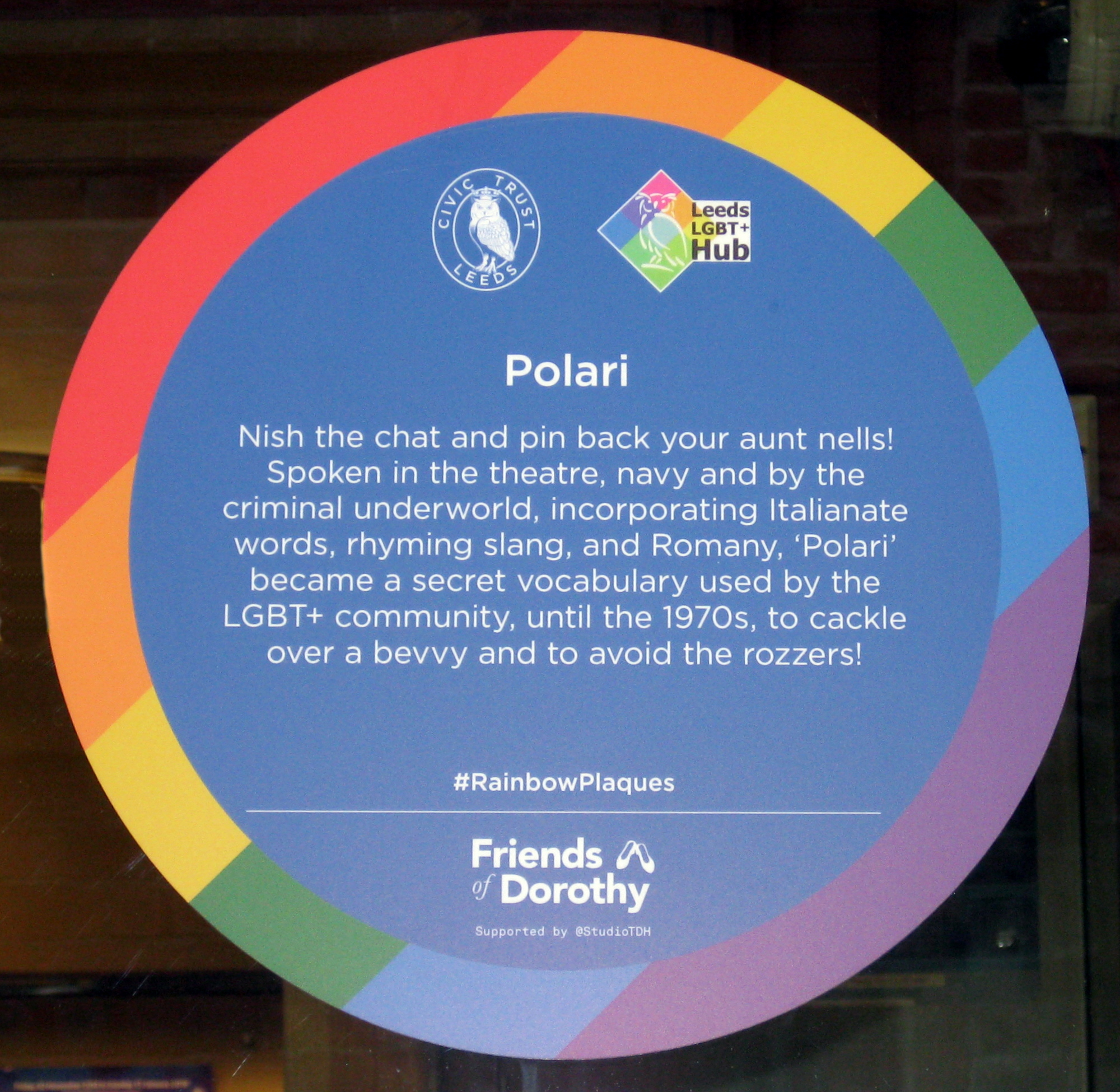
Plaque 15 on Leeds City Varieties theatre

== See also ==
- LGBT culture in Leeds
- List of Leeds Civic Trust plaques
