= Bramley Baths =

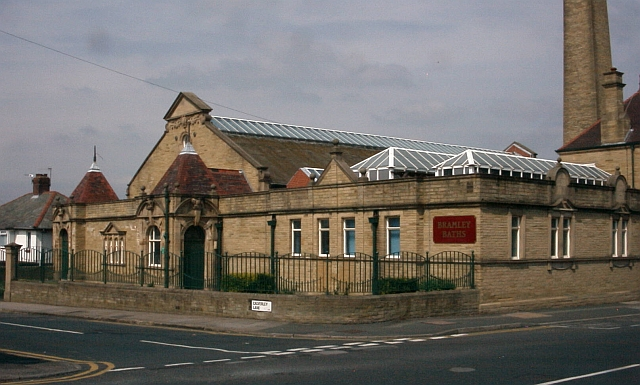
- Interactive map of the Bramley Baths area

General information
- Location: Broad Lane, Bramley, Leeds
- Coordinates: 53.81420°N 1.63873°W
- Opened: 1904; 122 years ago
- Owner: Leeds City Council
- Operator: Bramley Baths & Community Ltd

Design and construction
- Architect: J Lane Fox

Website
- bramleybaths.co.uk

Bramley Baths is a public swimming pool and the only remaining Edwardian bathhouse in Leeds.

== History ==
Bramley Baths was opened in 1904, in what was originally a steel foundry. It was one of 8 public baths were built in Leeds during 1899–1904 in response to a Cholera Epidemic, it provided a facility that allowed people to wash, swim and use Russian style Steam Baths – a fashionable pastime for Edwardians. It is now the only one of those 8 public baths remaining. In the early 20th Century, it was not always affordable to heat the pool so between the 1920s and 1960s it was boarded over during the winter months and used as a dancehall.

In 2011 Leeds City Council announced plans to reduce the opening times of Bramley Baths from 90 to 48 hours a week; due the possibility of the baths being closed entirely, a community group "Friends of Bramley Baths" was established and applied to take over the lease of Bramley Baths through a Community Asset Transfer scheme. Friends of Bramley Baths took over the running of the pool at the start of 2013 with the change marked by a "fancy dress plunge" event on New Years Day where participants were offered a free swim if they jumped into the pool in fancy dress. After the community group took over the running of the pool, it went from making an annual loss to an annual surplus and opened for 105 hours a week.

== Architectural features ==
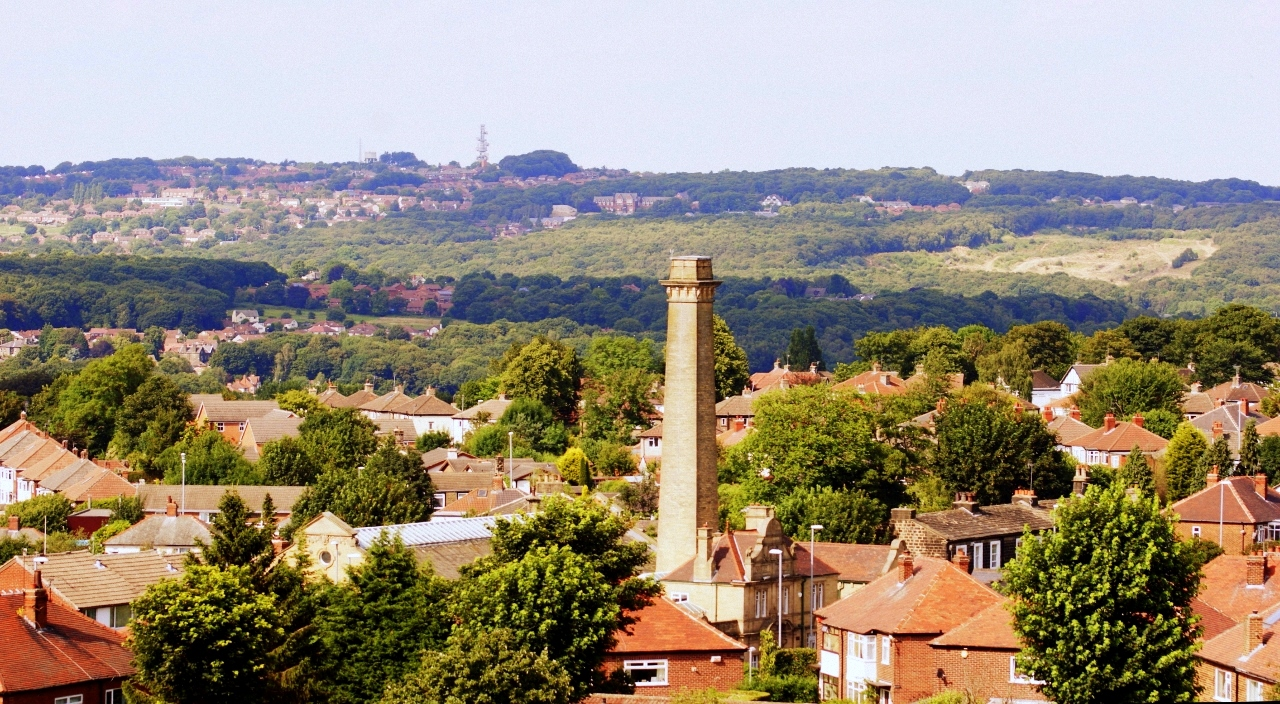
The chimney from the original iron foundry is visible across Bramley.

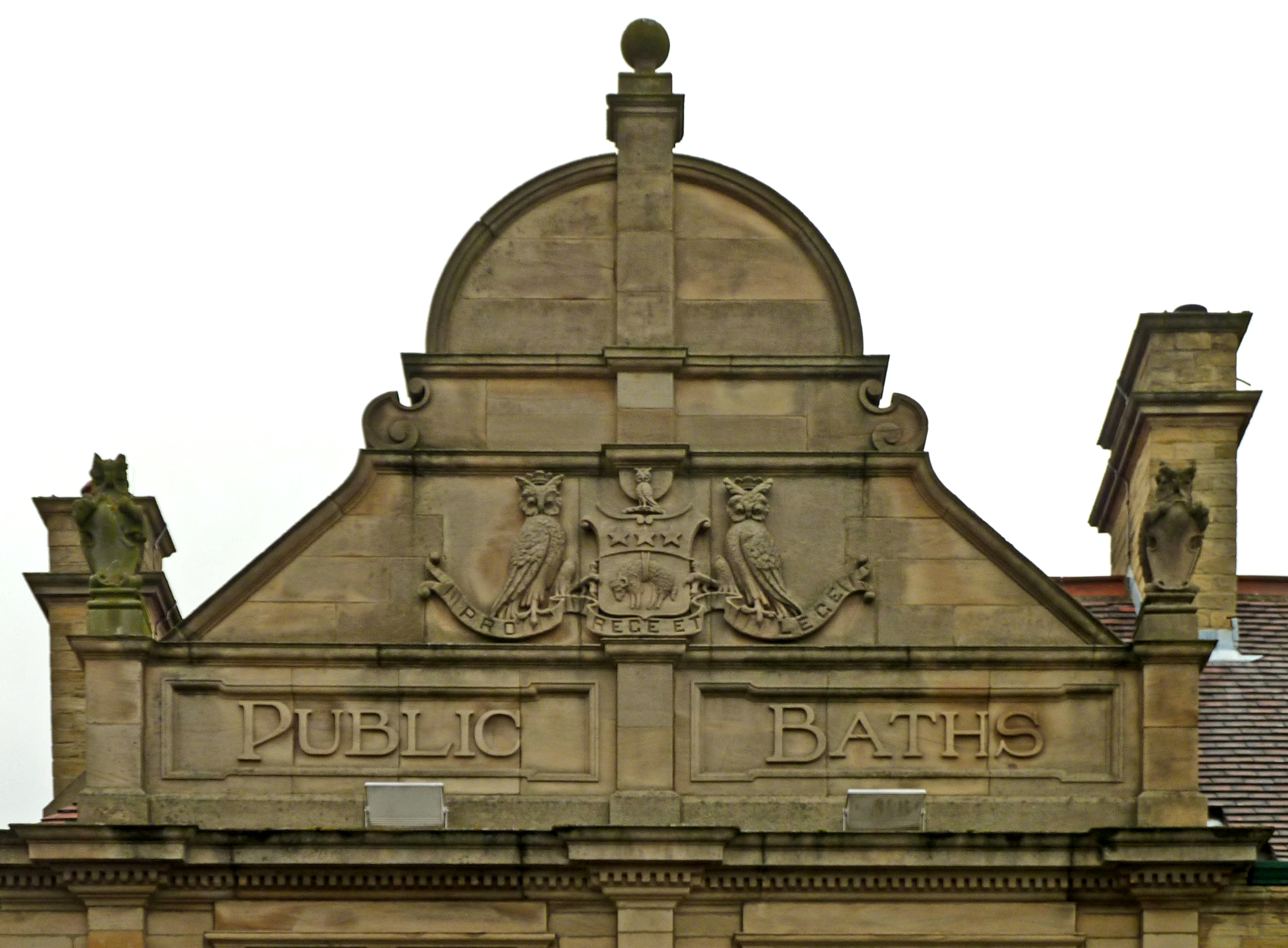
A dutch gable displays the Coat of arms of Leeds and the words 'PUBLIC BATHS'

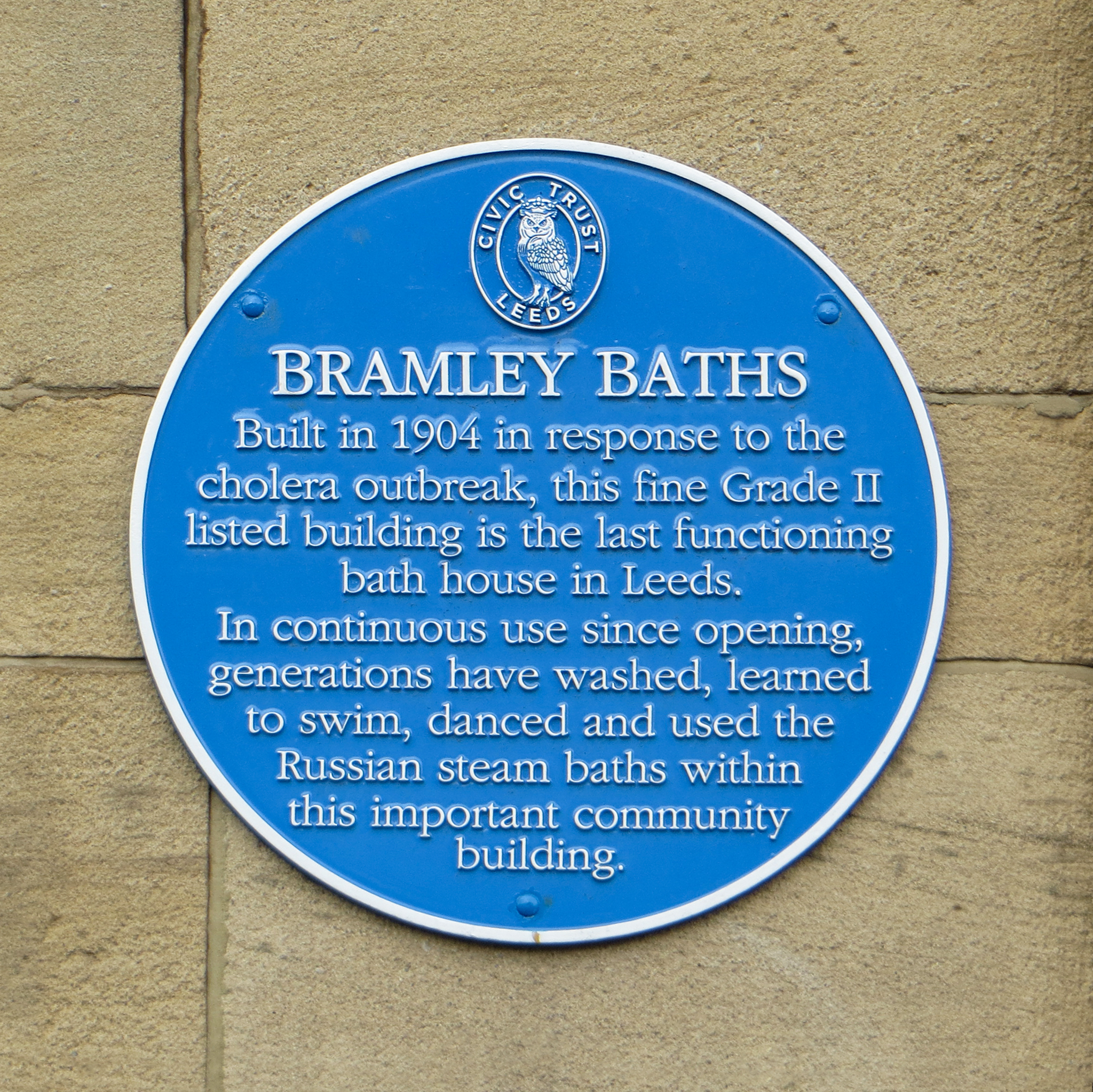
A blue plaque was added by Leeds Civic Trust in 2023.
