= Leeds Freedom Bridge =

Railway bridge in Leeds, England

Coordinates: 53.7949°N 1.5424°W

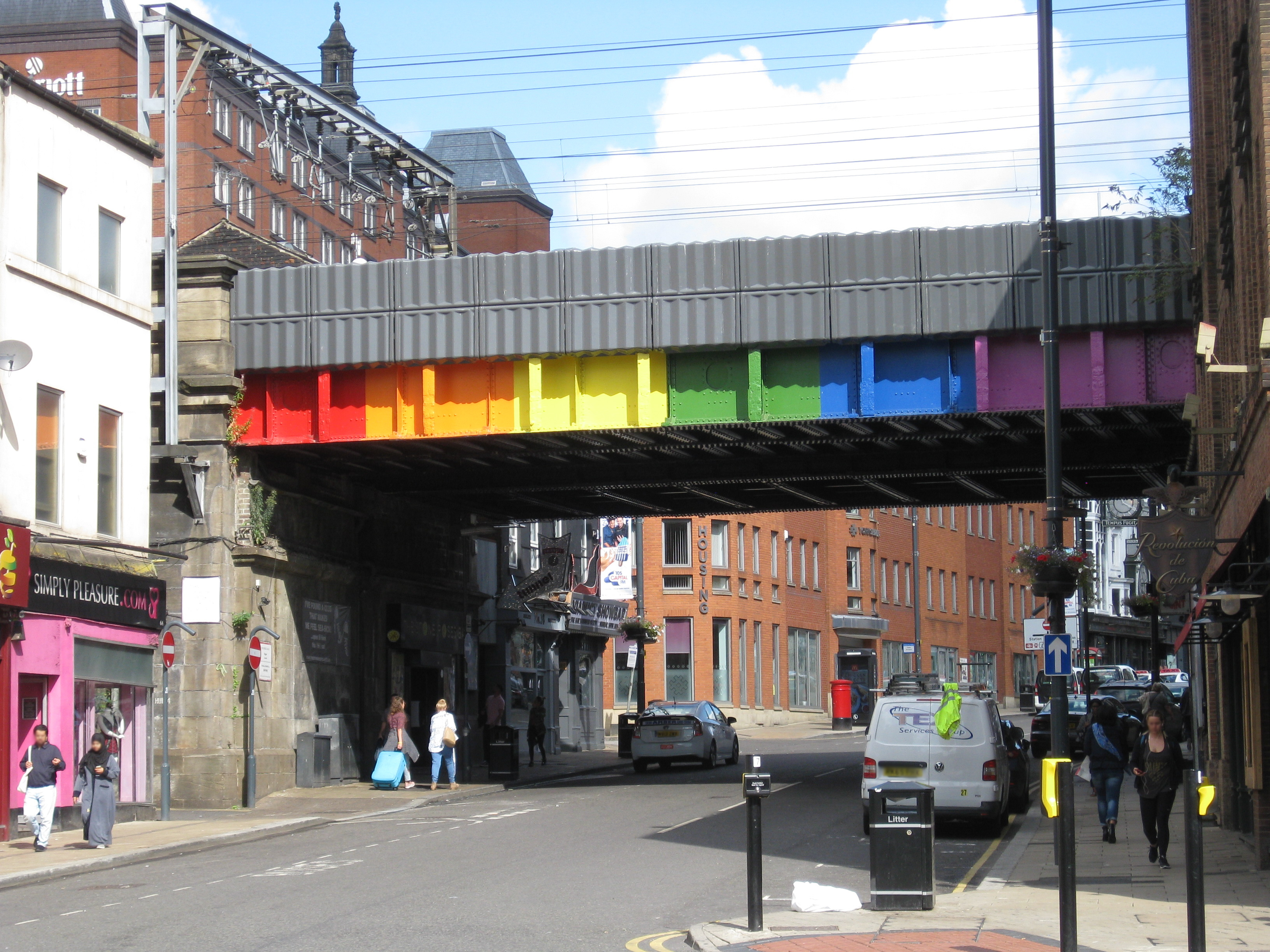
Bridge viewed from South, up Lower Briggate

The Leeds Freedom Bridge is a railway bridge (HUL4/53) that crosses over the area known as gayleeds on Lower Briggate in Leeds, West Yorkshire. This area is also where an annual LGBT+ parade Leeds Pride finishes, the bridge is now painted in the rainbow colours of the rainbow flag.

The bridge was due vital repairs by Network Rail but it was suggested by LGBT+ campaigner Thomas Wales that they should take this opportunity to re-paint the bridge in the rainbow colours of the Rainbow flag, in order to relate to the LGBT area of Leeds surrounding it. The maintenance work on the bridge began in September 2016 and was completed with the paintwork just in time for Valentine's Day in February 2017.

Once it was completed it became known as the 'Freedom Bridge’ a term coined by local LGBT+ activist Ross McCusker, the term itself relates to the rainbow paintwork which is inspired by the San Francisco artist Gilbert Baker's Freedom Flag.

Thomas Wales mentioned that the idea came about because it had been mentioned by a few individuals that they wanted to highlight the changing, progressive landscape of the city. Leeds City Council and local business' also contributed their support to the project.
