= The Bookish Type =

Bookstore in Leeds, England

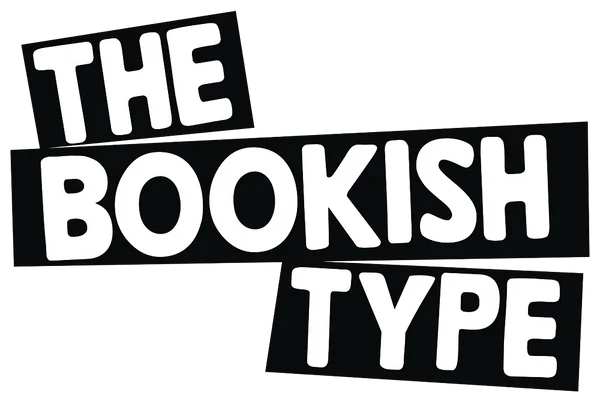
- The Bookish Type's logo
- Interactive map of the The Bookish Type area

General information
- Location: 77a Great George St, Leeds LS1 3BR, United Kingdom
- Coordinates: 53.8011°N 1.5532°W
- Opened: September 2020

Website
- thebookishtype.co.uk

The Bookish Type is an independent bookstore on Great George Street in the city centre of Leeds, in West Yorkshire, United Kingdom. The store is the first bookshop in the United Kingdom to be owned by a trans woman, and one of the first LGBTQ+ bookshops in the country to be owned by women.

== History ==
Before opening the store, its owners had opened several pop-up stalls from May 2019 to January 2020 to see if opening a bookstore was commercially viable. They finally opened the bookstore in September 2020, in the Merrion Centre, Leeds. The store was created with the intent of providing affordable books with queer representation.

The store was taken over by new management in 2025; friends Emily Reynolds, Liza Bulhakova and Caitlyn Oakes.

== Description ==
All books sold at The Bookish Type are either written by LGBTQ+ authors, or have LGBTQ+ themes and characters. The store uses a community-funded 'pay it forward' purchase model that allows customers—particularly youth—to purchase books at a lower price if needed.

== Community events ==
Every few months, the store sells second hand books as part of their second hand Sunday event. All proceeds go towards helping local transgender people pay for gender-affirming healthcare, and funding LGBTQ+ grassroots organizations.

Bookstore staff also lead queer history tours around Leeds, and run an outdoor book group called the Bookish Stroll.

== Harry Potter defacement fundraiser ==
As a way to raise money for five local transgender people's healthcare funds, The Bookish Type allowed customers to deface a secondhand copy of Harry Potter and the Chamber of Secrets for £0.25 per page.

The store expanded the fundraiser by setting up an online donation page. Donors could email the store instructions on how they want their page(s) to be defaced, requiring purchase confirmation to be shown in the email. Once the copy was completed, the store auctioned it as a 'trans community art piece' to raise further funds. A spokesperson from the store said the fundraiser was a way of "tending to grief within social and political movements to avoid burnout and build sustainable resistance." The fundraiser coincided with the trailer for the HBO Max Harry Potter series, the release of which led to criticism of J.K. Rowling for her trans-exclusionary beliefs.

== Harassment of staff ==
The Bookish Type's staff have experienced several incidents of homophobic and transphobic harassment, threats, and abuse. Incidents include people shouting at store staff and volunteers, especially those who are visibly queer, and people spitting on the store's exterior because it had a "Freedom for Palestine" poster.
