= Transvestism and Transsexualism in Modern Society =

1974 trans rights conference

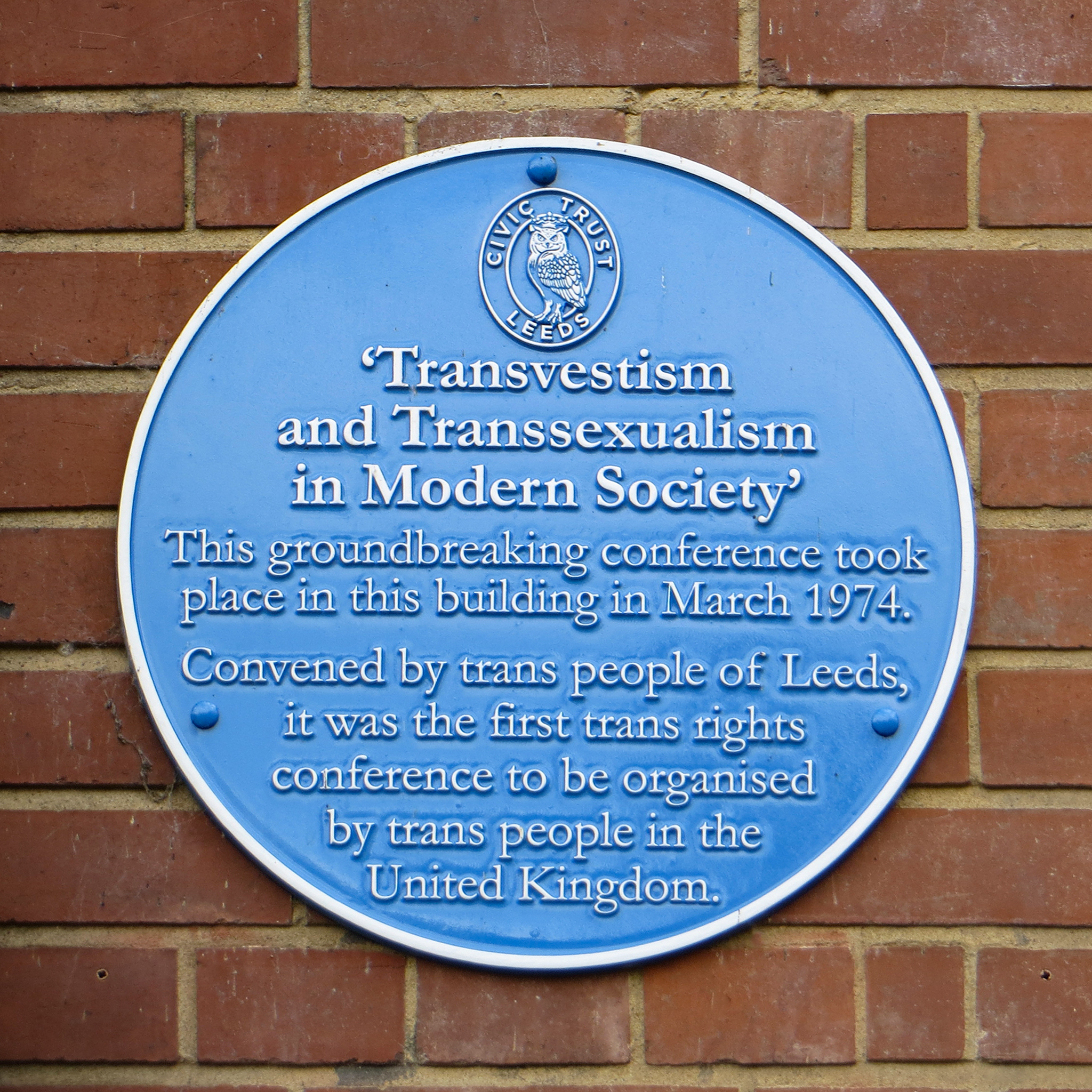
- Nickname: The First National TV.TS Conference
- Begins: 15 March 1974
- Ends: 17 March 1974
- Venue: The Guildford Hotel; University of Leeds; Leeds Polytechnic
- Country: England
- Founders: June Willmott; Caroline Robertson
- Attendance: 102

Transvestism and Transsexualism in Modern Society, also known as The First National TV.TS Conference, was a conference held in Leeds, England, from 15 to 17 March 1974. It was the first such event to be organised by members of the community. With an educational remit, the conference sought to further understanding of issues faced by transvestites and trans women.

== Background ==
Organised in part by the Beaumont Society, a support group for transvestite women established in 1966, the conference provided information from social workers on legal and medical rights, and it gave a rare opportunity for attendees to meet other community members. Key figures in its delivery were June Willmott, a local Beaumont Society representative, and Caroline Robertson, a postgraduate researcher at the University of Leeds.

A previous conference concerning gender identity was held at the Piccadilly Hotel in London in 1969. Titled the First International Symposium on Gender Identity: Aims, Functions and Clinical Problems of a Gender Identity Unit, this conference had a medical focus and was not organised by transgender community members. In this way, Leeds was the first transgender rights conference to be organised by transgender people in the United Kingdom. The Leeds conference was also precise about the differences in terminology between transvestite, transsexual, and transgender communities.

Whilst the majority of attendees were invited by letter, there was some limited advertising of the event, including a notice in The Gryphon, the University of Leeds' student newspaper.

== Aims ==
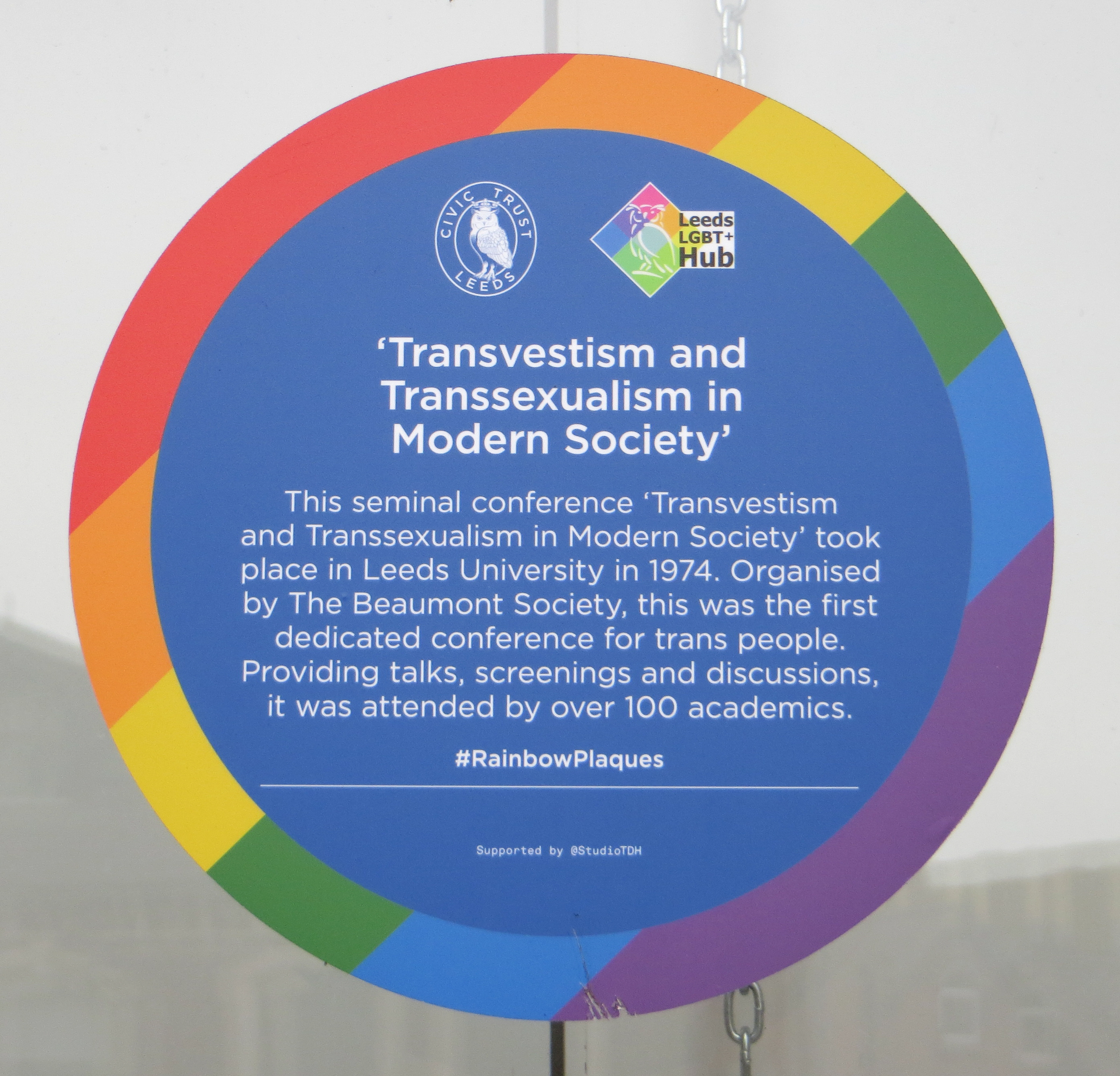
Rainbow plaque about the conference on the front of the Parkinson Building, University of Leeds

With a primarily educational remit, the conference brought together members of the transgender community (predominately transgender women), as well as social workers and some legal and medical experts. In her opening speech, June Willmott stated that:

We hope, most fervently, that such better understanding may ultimately mean that the transvestite and the transsexual can walk freely abroad in Society, offending no-one, better understood by some, and, we hope, tolerated by all.

— June Willmott, Opening remarks, Transvestism and Transsexuality in Modern Society Conference Report

An evening reception held at the Guildford Hotel on the Headrow in Leeds on the 15 March. Attended by 52 people, the evening, according to historian Kit Heyham, "transformed the hotel's first floor into a queer space". Those present were free to openly use women's names, wear women's clothing and use the women's toilets. During the evening reception, some attendees were interviewed by the Yorkshire Evening Post. Geoffrey Winter, a lead journalist at the Post, described his reaction as:

I had reacted like a man toward women – standing up at their approach and pulling up chairs for them… and then realising and wondering why I was doing it.

— Geoffrey Winter, Plight of Men who Seek Acceptance as Women, Yorkshire Evening Post, 16 March 1974

The main conference was held on 16 March at the University of Leeds, followed by a disco that evening, with a more informal day of workshops and open discussion on 17 March at Leeds Polytechnic.

With 102 people attending, speakers at the conference on 16 March included: Margaret Williams of the Beaumont Society on 'The Psychology of Transvestism and Transsexualism'; Julia Tonner of the UK branch of the Transsexual Action Organisation on 'Fit or Misfit - The Position of the Transsexual in Modern Society'; Della Aleksander, who had appeared on Open Door, a BBC programme; social worker Doreen Cordell; and Dr. Elizabeth Ferris, who was a researcher based at Charing Cross' Gender Identity Clinic. These were followed by a screening of the 1968 documentary The Queen, a film about New York City's underground drag scene.

A report on the event established differences in opinion between attendees, referring to both radical and conservative voices being heard.

== Legacy ==
According to sociologists, the conference included what may have been the first recorded use of terminology such as "trans.people" [sic] and "gender alignment".

Mel Porter notes that despite its significance for transvestite and transsexual communities, the conference did not attract wider support from the gay movement.

In 2018 the significance of the conference was recognised by Leeds Civic Trust and was featured in their temporary 'Rainbow Plaques' trail for Leeds Pride that year. In 2024 the trust unveiled a permanent blue plaque to celebrate the 50th anniversary of the conference.

== See also ==
- Transgender history in the United Kingdom
