= Terry George (entrepreneur) =

British businessman

- Born: 14 March 1965 (age 61); Leeds, West Yorkshire, England
- Occupations: Entrepreneur, nightclub owner
- Website: Official website

Terry George (born 14 March 1965) is a British businessman known primarily for his appearances in television programmes. He was born and raised in Leeds, West Yorkshire.

== Business ==
George earned his wealth running gay nightclubs and bars in Leeds. He established a memorial website called gonetoosoon.org that was popular in the mid-2000s.

== Media ==
George and his husband Michael Rothwell featured in a 6-part fly-on-the-wall documentary titled Two Queens and a Castle. The program was broadcast on the Bio Channel.

George has featured in three television documentaries about Michael Jackson, Secret Millionaire (Channel 4), Star Traders: The Christmas Challenge (ITV1) and Louis, Martin & Michael (BBC).

In 2008 his home has featured on Channel 5's Britain's Best Home and was eventually voted the winner in a public vote.

== Personal life ==
George and his partner Michael Rothwell were amongst the first couples in Britain to enter into a civil partnership in 2005.
