= Cyril Livingstone =

Leeds based theatre actor, director, critic and couturier

Cyril Livingstone (28 March 1921 – 31 March 2011) was an English Leeds-based theatre director, actor, critic and couturier.

== Early life ==
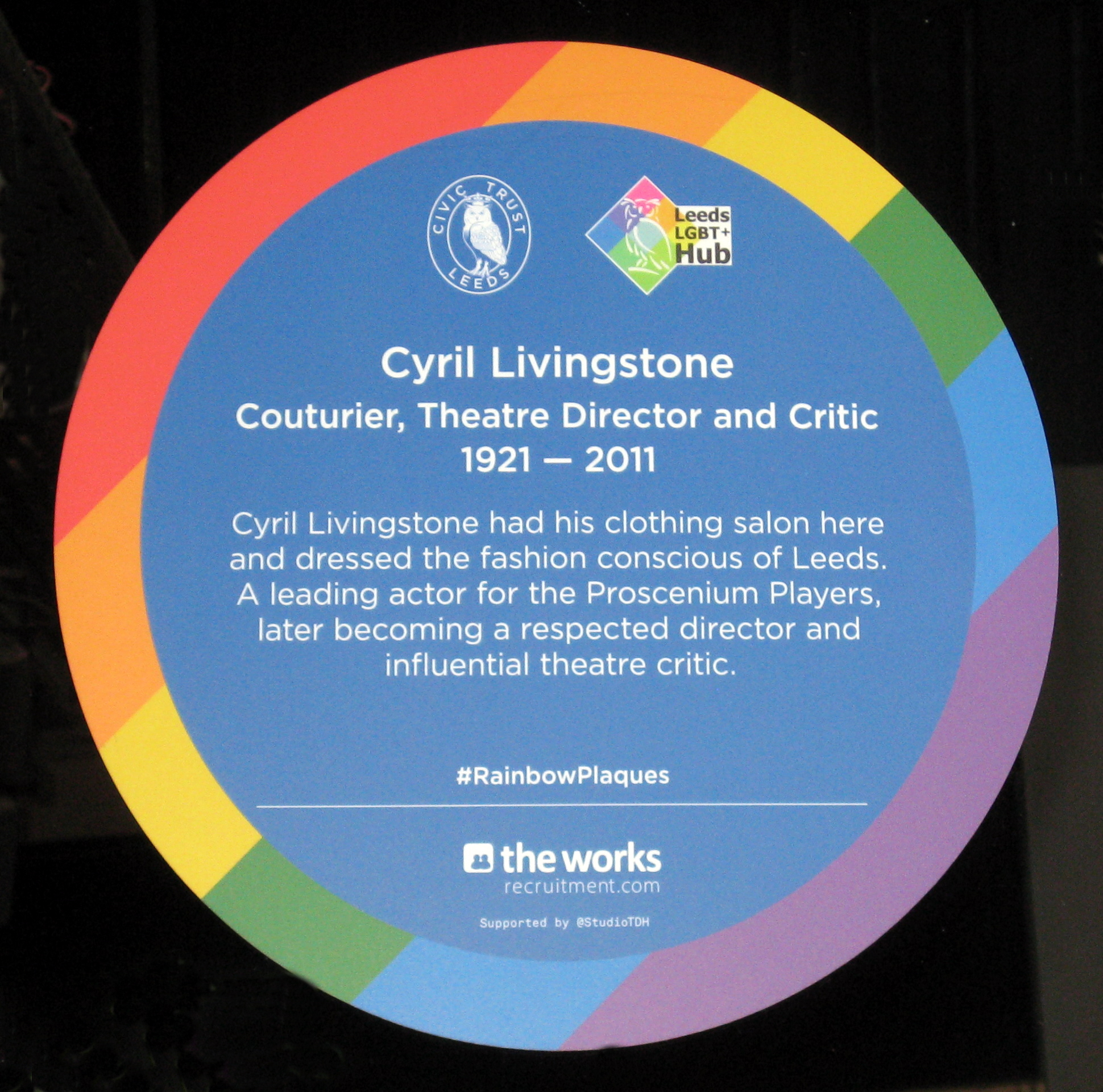

Cyril Livingstone was born on 28 March 1921, he was the youngest of three brothers born to Joseph and Bertha Livingstone.

== Family Salon ==
Livingstone's family owned a clothing shop, and after the Second World War he joined his family business. The salon was located on North Street, then later moved to Albion Place. The shop attracted the stylish people of Leeds and played an integral part in the Leeds fashion scene at the time. In an interview with the Yorkshire Evening Post, Livingstone's friend and colleague John Fisher, stated that people would flock to Livingstone's shop in order to buy the latest haute couture fashion; with clients often asking for Livingstone's opinion on what would suite them. This sparked his love of design, which he would then use later on for stage productions.

== Theatre career ==
In 1948, Livingstone co-founded the amateur Jewish acting group, the Proscenium Players. The Players first play they performed was An Inspector Calls by J. B. Priestley. Livingstone became their lead actor and enjoyed playing sinister and menacing characters. In the 1950s he starred in numerous Harry Hanson plays for his company the Court Players. He often performed at the Leeds Royal Theatre (which is no longer in existence) and was invited to perform at the 1960s York Festival. He was cast as Caiaphas in the festival's production of York Cycle of Mystery Plays.

In addition to directing and acting he was also a sketch writer for Leeds University Rag Revue at Leeds Empire. In the 1950s Livingstone began to write theatrical pieces and began reviewing work at Leeds Civic Theatre. Notably, he reviewed Peter O'Toole's play A Month in the Country. Livingstone was not a fan of the play in his critic and O'Toole never spoke to him again. Additionally, he worked on and designed sets for plays that were on around Leeds. He designed the set for The Dybbuk. In 1959 Cyril Livingstone directed The Diary of Anne Frank. He played a part in the beginning of Frankie Vaughan's career.

Livingstone died aged 90 on 31 March 2011.

== Legacy ==
Livingstone's legacy, memories and work was commemorated with a rainbow plaque at Hotel Chocolat in Leeds to remember his contributions to the LGBT+ community and Leeds Culture.
