= Cloth hall =

Historic building in the marketplace of a European town

A cloth hall or linen hall (German: Gewandhaus; Polish: Sukiennice; French: Halle aux draps; Dutch: Lakenhal) is a form of market hall building located in the centre of the main marketplace of a European town. Cloth halls were built from medieval times into the 18th century.

A cloth hall contained trading stalls for the sale of cloth and other goods, such as leather, wax, salt, and exotic imports such as silks and spices. Cloth halls were usually along major trade routes, sometimes providing lodging for merchants and serving as customs posts.

== By country ==
=== Belgium ===
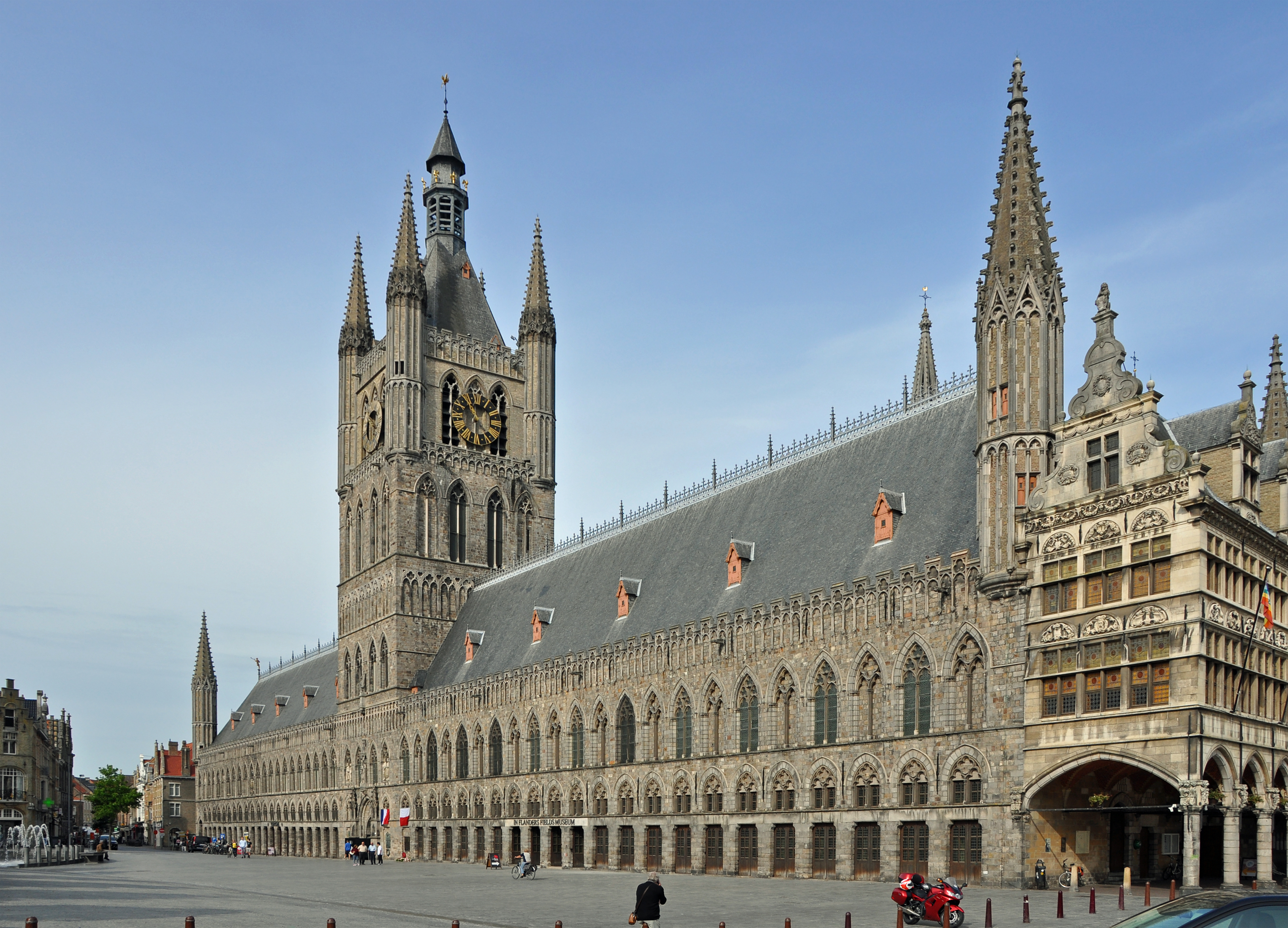
Ypres Broadcloth Hall

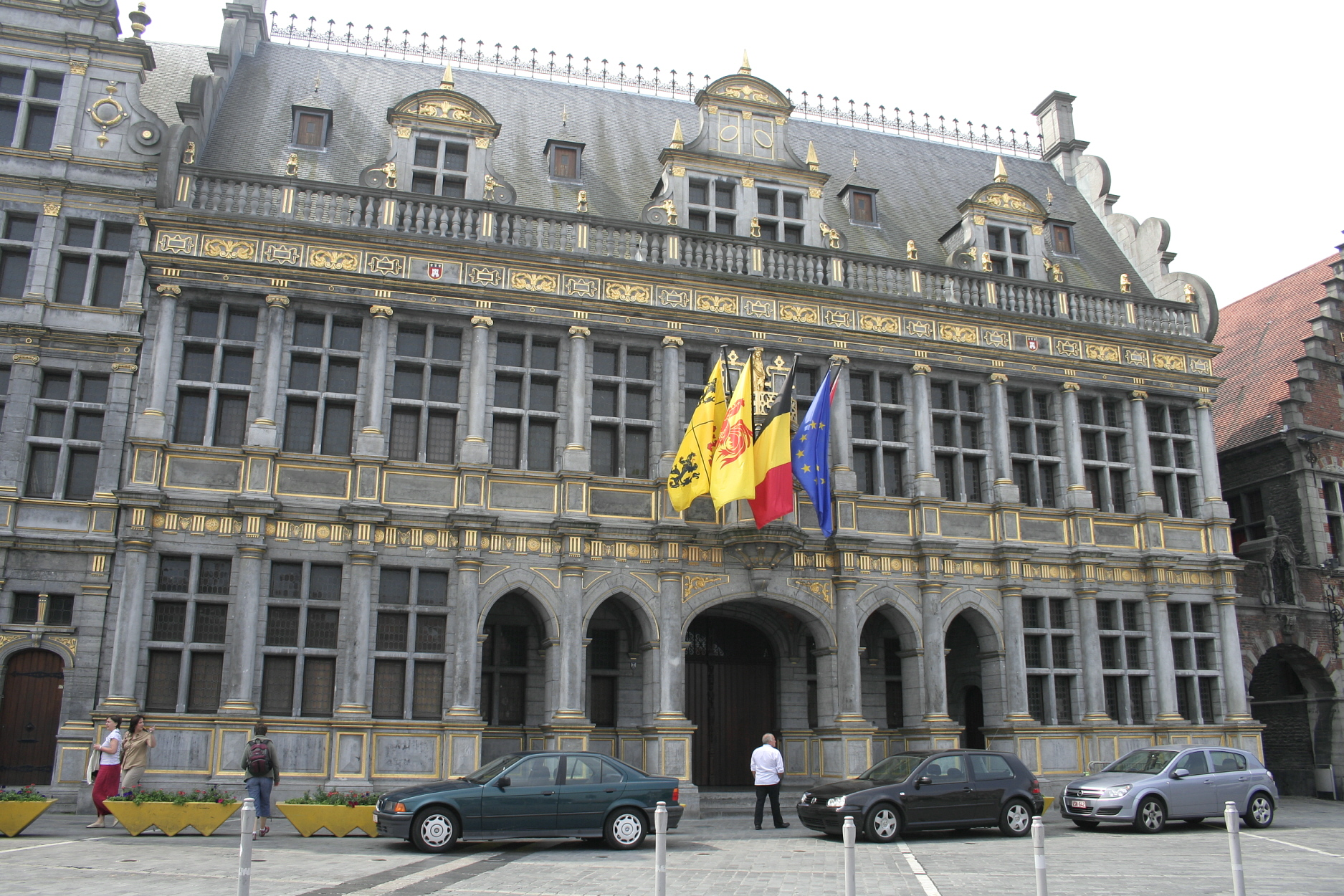
Tournai Cloth Hall

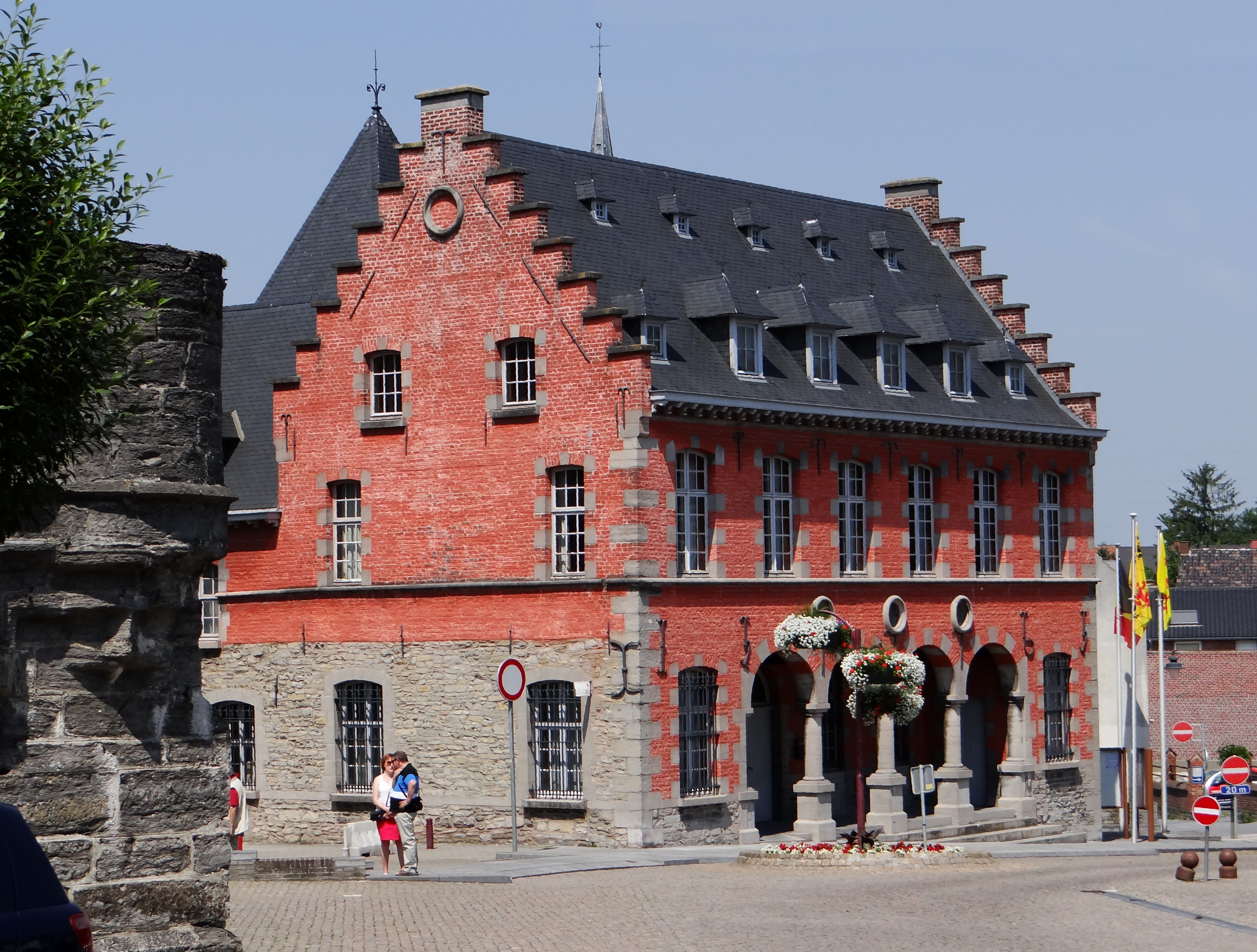
Former cloth hall and later town hall of Antoing

Examples of cloth halls in Belgium include the Ypres Cloth Hall and cloth halls in Bruges, Leuven, and Tournai. Leuven's Linen-Hall is in an early-Gothic style, with baroque addition, and now serves as the Leuven University Hall.

- Antoing: the former town hall had been built as a cloth hall in 1565
- Bruges: Kontor of Bruges
- Brussels, see Drapery Court of Brussels
- Dendermonde: Belfry of Dendermonde
- Diest: Cloth Hall of Diest
- Tournai: Cloth Hall of Tournai
- Geel: former city hall
- Ghent: Belfry of Ghent
- Halen: on the site of the current town hall
- Hasselt: Cloth Hall, since the 18th century Meeting House of the Literary Society
- Heestert: Lakenhalle OLV Hemelvaart
- Herentals: Belfry of Herentals
- Ypres: Ypres Cloth Hall
- Kortrijk: Great Cloth Hall, destroyed in 1944, now Schouwburgplein.
- Langemark: 1296–1344, destroyed by Ypres weavers
- Leuven: University Hall (Leuven)
- Lier, Belgium: the current Town Hall of Lier.
- Maaseik
- Mechelen: Town Hall of Mechelen
- Nieuwkerke, demolished in 1844
- Oudenaarde: Oudenaarde Town Hall
- Sint-Truiden: Belfry of Sint-Truiden
- Tielt: Belfry of Tielt
- Turnhout: old Town Hall of Turnhout on Herentalsstraat, demolished in 1962
- Zinnik
- Verviers
- Zoutleeuw: Cloth Hall of Zoutleeuw

=== Britain and Ireland ===
British examples are Drapers' Hall, London; the Piece Hall, Halifax; and Leeds' White Cloth Hall.

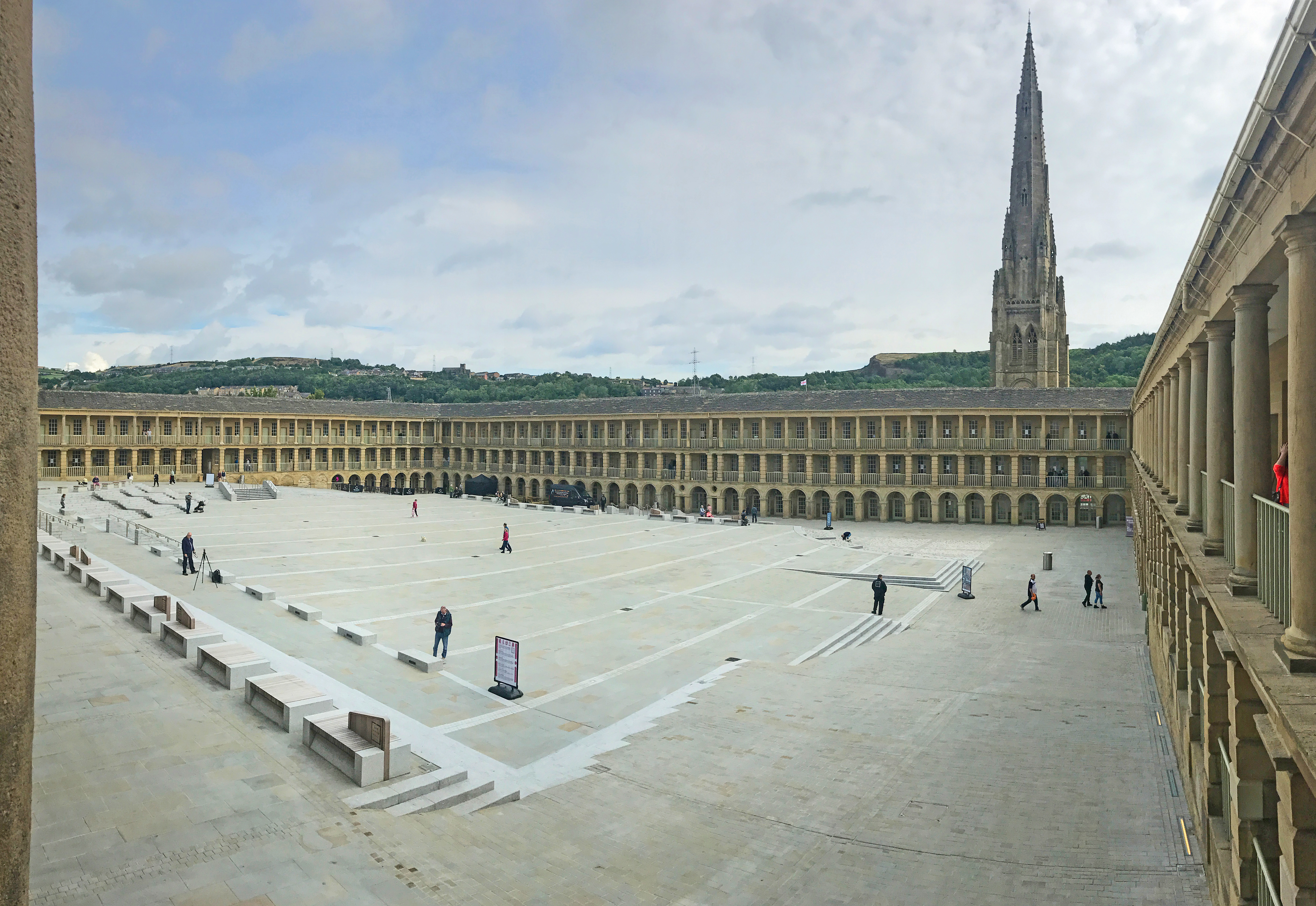
Piece Hall (cloth hall), Halifax, England

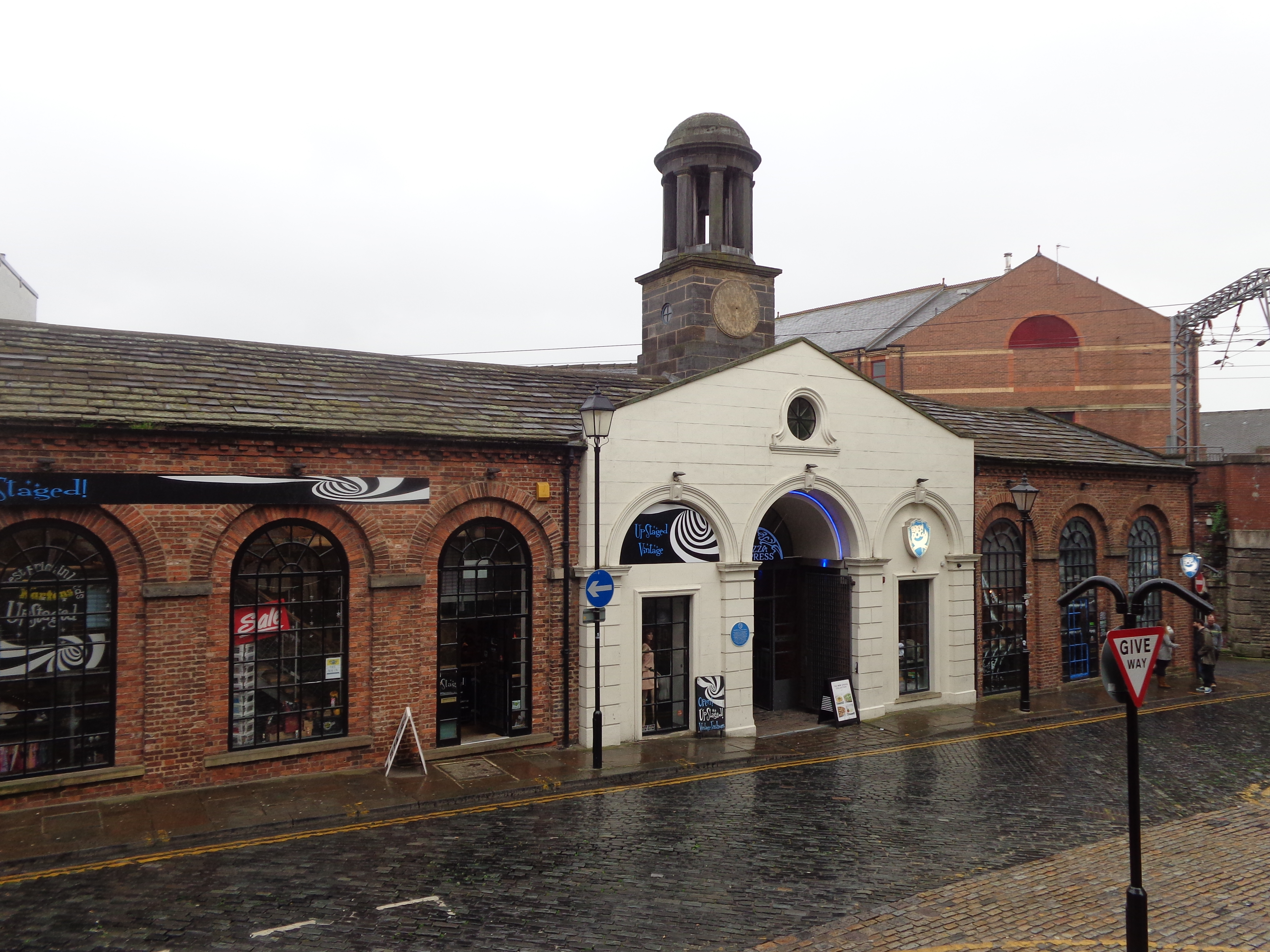
Surviving part of Leeds' 3rd White Cloth Hall (opened 1775)

In Ireland, the Dublin Linen Hall was completed in 1728, and later White Linen Hall was constructed in Belfast. The Linen Hall Library is located in this area. There were linen halls in other towns such as Castlebar (which includes Linenhall Arts Centre) and Clonakilty.

=== Germany ===
Examples of German Gewandhäuser can be found in the towns of Brunswick, Zwickau, and Leipzig.

The rebuilt, third Leipzig Gewandhaus is home to the Leipzig Gewandhaus Orchestra.

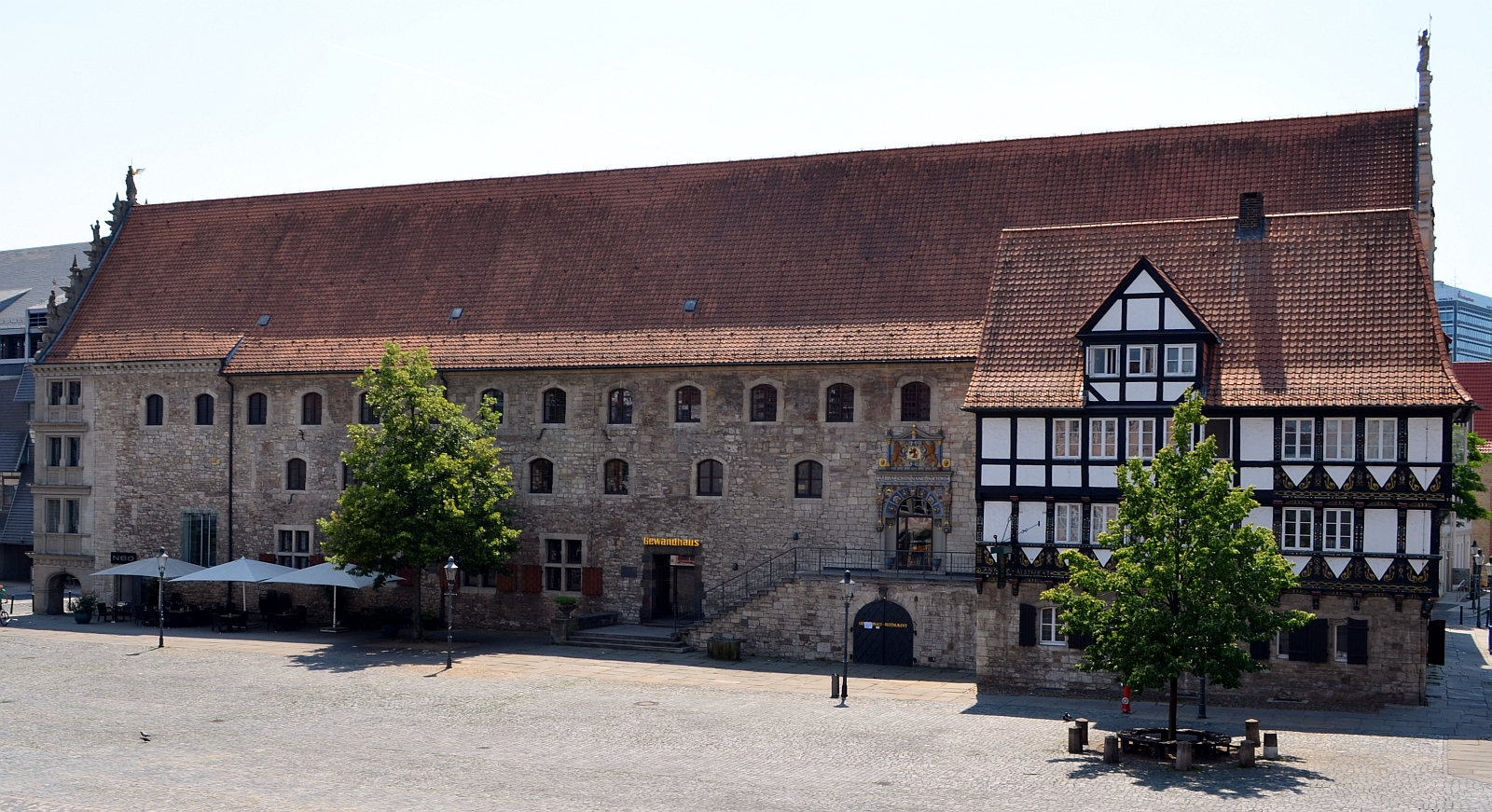
Gewandhaus (Cloth Hall) in Brunswick, Germany

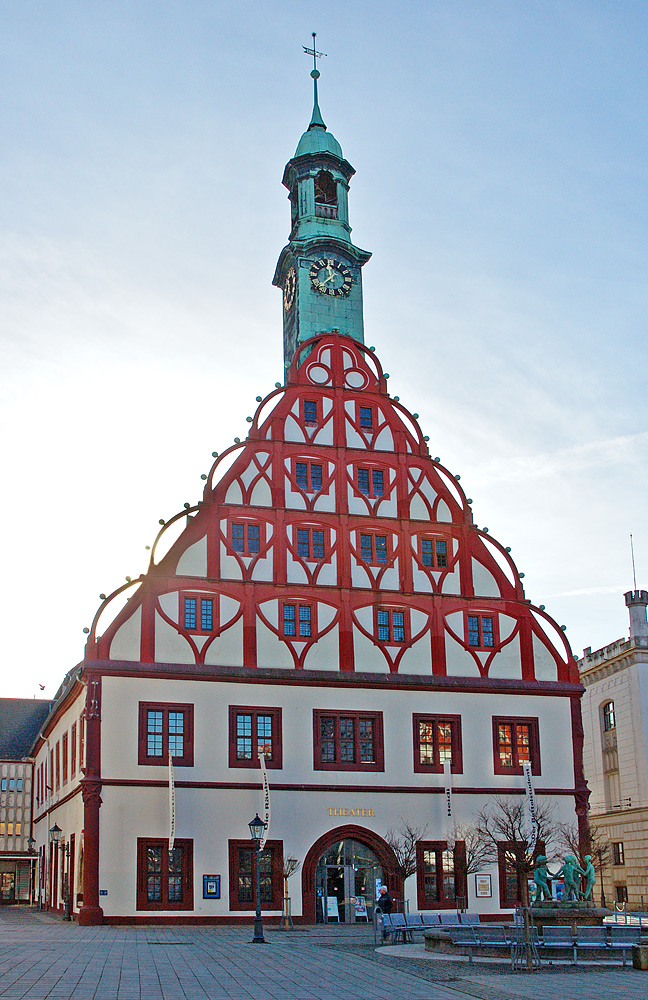
Gewandhaus (Cloth Hall) in Zwickau, Germany

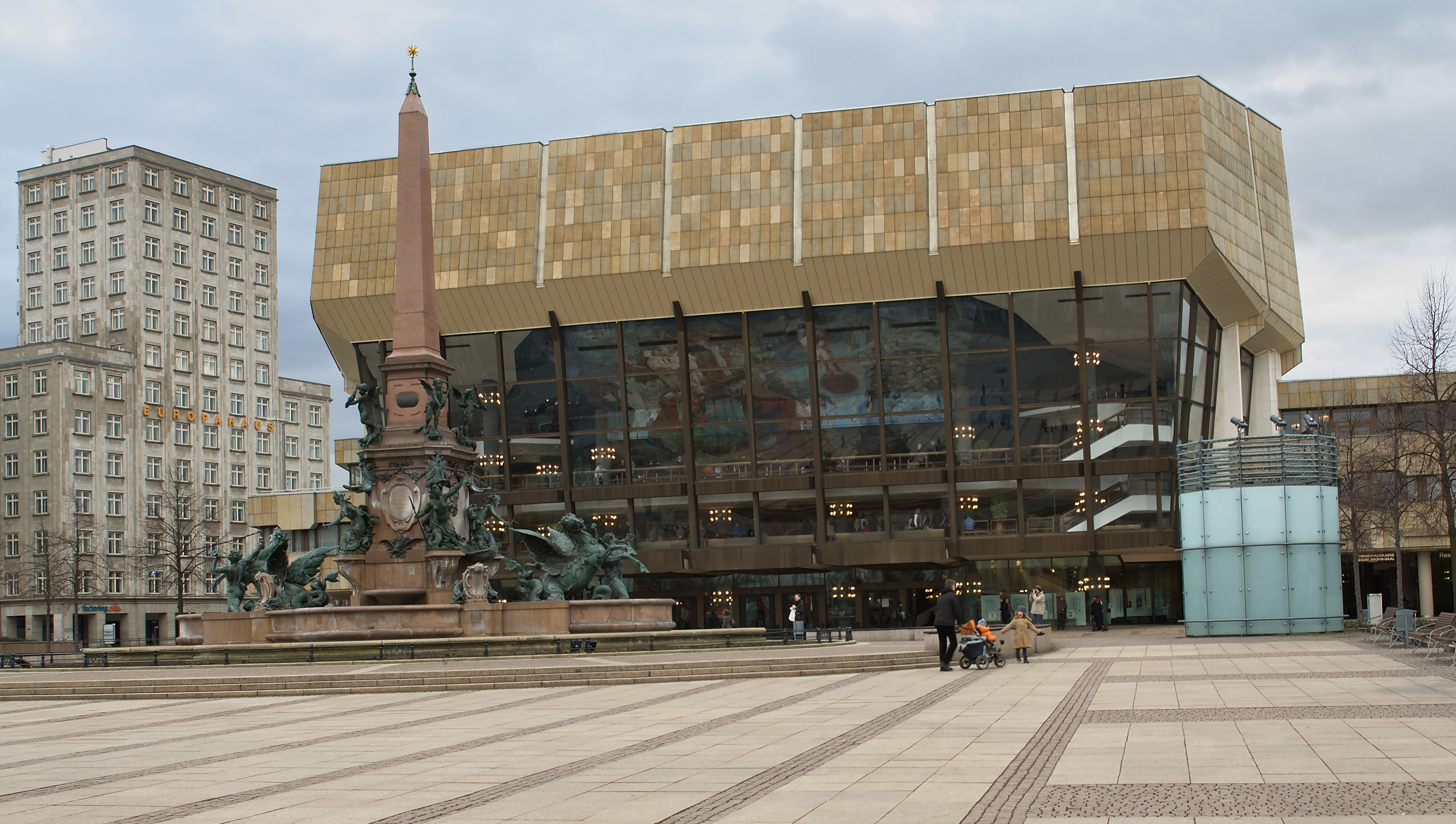
Rebuilt, third Leipzig Gewandhaus concert hall (opened 1981)

=== Netherlands ===
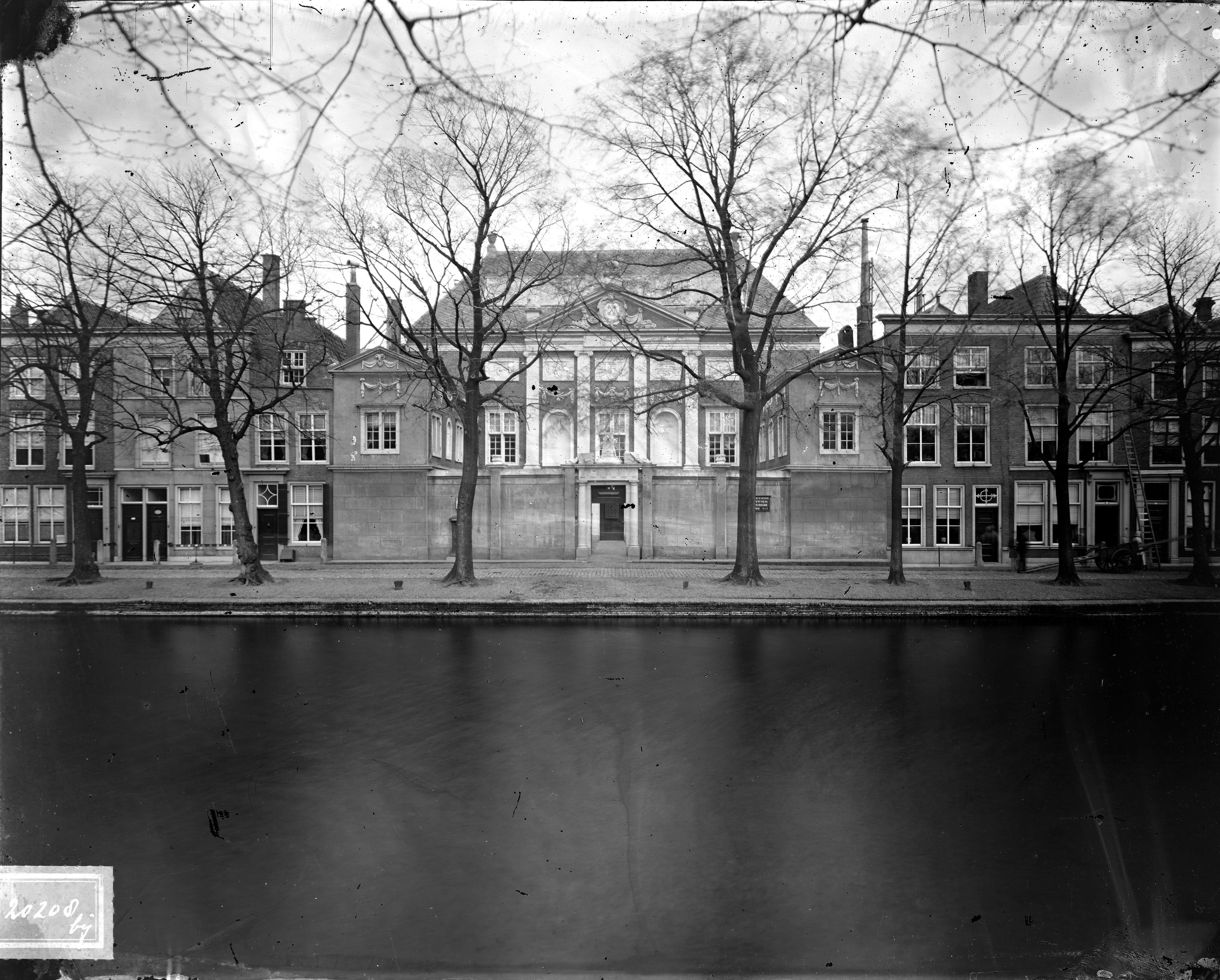
Leiden (Holland) Broadcloth Hall: 19th-century view of present-day Museum De Lakenhal (Cloth-Hall Museum) of art

The former Cloth Hall in Leiden, Netherlands, has, since the 19th century, housed the Museum De Lakenhal (Municipal Cloth-Hall Museum) of art.

- Amsterdam: cloth hall Groenburgwal, nowadays an Anglican church named Christ Church (Amsterdam)
- Echt, Netherlands
- Deventer: Wanthuis, part of the Deventer town hall since the 15th/16th century.
- Dordrecht: later called Huis Scharlaeken. Demolished in 1858. The Watersteinstoren used to be part of it for a time.
- Leiden: Laecken-Halle, see Museum De Lakenhal
- Maastricht: Cloth hall at the Market square; linen weavers mainly resided in the Boschstraatkwartier
- Middelburg, Zeeland
- Nijmegen: Gewandhuis/Lakenhal, Great Market square 22–25; the current Kerkboog is a remnant of it.
- Sittard: at the Market square, destroyed
- Weert. Weerter cloth was also traded in the Halle van Weert in Hoogstraat in Bergen op Zoom and stored in De Stadt van Weert in Reijnderstraat in Antwerp.

=== Poland ===
In Poland, the most famous existing cloth-hall building is Kraków's Cloth Hall (Sukiennice), rebuilt in 1555 in Renaissance style. The 14th-century Gothic cloth hall in Toruń is preserved as part of the Old Town Market Hall.

Cloth halls formerly also existed in Poznań, at the Old Market Square; and in Wrocław, at the site of the street now called ulica Sukiennice (Cloth-Hall Street).

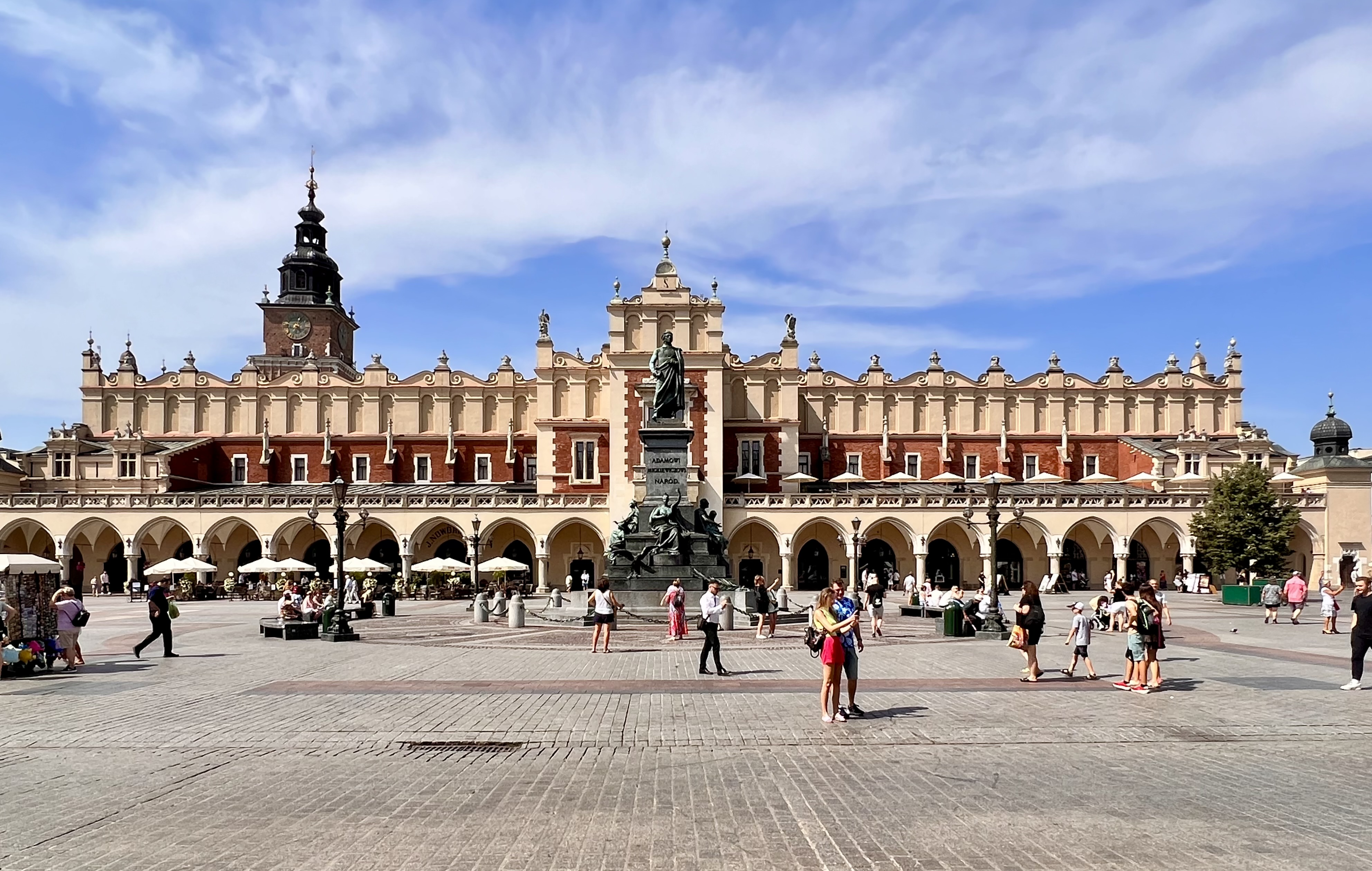
Sukiennice (Cloth Hall), Kraków, Poland

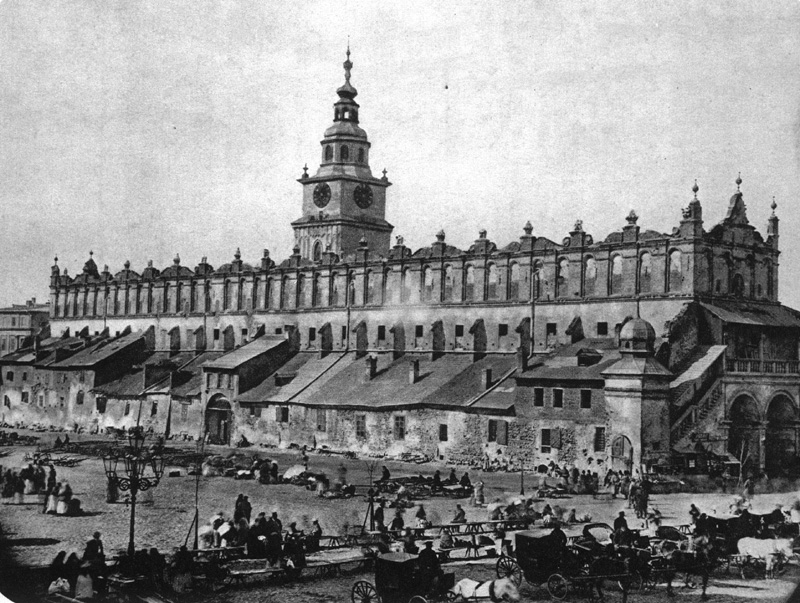
Kraków's Sukiennice (Cloth Hall), c. 1870

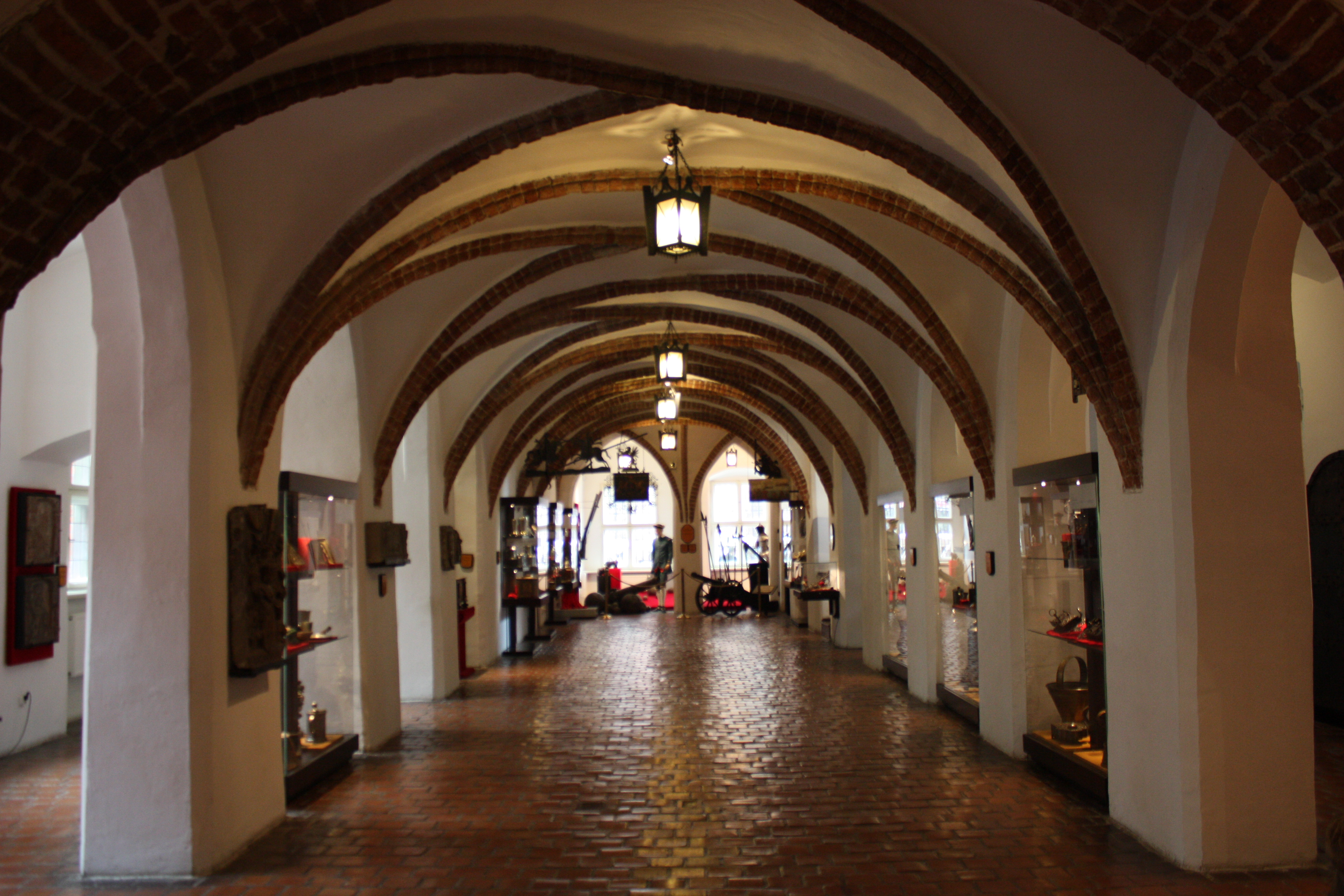
Gothic cloth hall in Old Town Market Hall, Toruń, Poland
