= Kirkgate Market =

Coordinates: 53.7972°N 1.5397°W

- The 1904 Hall on Vicar Lane and George Street

General information
- Architectural style: Flemish/Art Nouveau (1904 hall)
- Location: Leeds, England
- Construction started: 1875
- Completed: 1981
- Owner: Leeds City Council

Design and construction
- Architect: Joseph and John Leeming (1904 hall)
- Engineer: J Bagshaw and Sons of Batley (1904 hall)
- Designations

Listed Building – Grade I
- Designated: 8 May 1973
- Reference no.: 1255765

Website
- leeds.gov.uk/leedsmarkets

Kirkgate Market (pronounced /ˈkɜːrɡət/) is a market complex on Vicar Lane in the city centre of Leeds, West Yorkshire, England. It is the largest covered market in Europe and a Grade I listed building. There are currently 800 stalls which attract over 100,000 visitors a week.

== Location ==
The markets are situated with their front facing onto Vicar Lane and the southern face onto Kirkgate. To the east is Leeds City bus station, while to the north is the Victoria Gate development. To the south of the open market is the markets multi-storey car park operated by National Car Parks (NCP). From across Vicar Lane, the markets are connected to Briggate via the Victoria Quarter.

== History ==
=== Origins ===
The markets first opened in 1822 as an open-air market, and between 1850 and 1875 the first covered sections of the market had been constructed after the market moved from Briggate. The Central Market hall, built alongside Duncan Street, was surrounded on three sides by shops that were mainly rented to butchers and fishmongers. Inside the hall, stalls were erected for the sale of fruit, vegetables, and dairy produce, with the balcony being used for selling fancy goods. The South Market, bordering Hunslet Lane and Meadow Lane, was used by butchers, various goods shops, open stalls, nine slaughterhouses and eighteen homes.

Plans for a market on the Kirkgate site were first unveiled in 1850 by Borough Commissioner to plans modelled on Joseph Paxton's Crystal Palace in London's Hyde Park. Development began on the current site in 1857. Then in 1875, further land was acquired to the South and East for the expansion of the market.

The Corn Exchange and First and Third White Cloth Halls were all situated in close proximity, creating a market area in the city centre. The Third White Cloth Hall moved to Queen Street in 1865, ending this concentrated area of market trading.

=== Early expansion ===
In 1894, Fish Row was created – a row of fishmongers in a cooled area of the market. Between 1891 and 1895, a domed glazed roof was added to the market hall. A dedicated meat market and abattoir was developed in 1899. The cost of these expansions totalled over £25,000.

=== Marks & Spencer ===
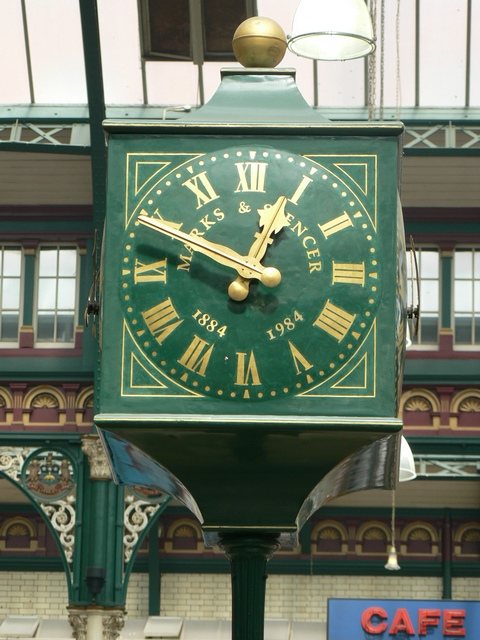
The Centenary Clock, marking the Marks & Spencer connection.

In 1884, Kirkgate Market was the founding location of Marks & Spencer which opened in Leeds Market as a penny bazaar. The Marks & Spencer's heritage is marked by the Market Clock in the 1904 hall which bears the shop's name. This clock was unveiled in 1984 to celebrate the centenary of Marks & Spencer. In 2012 Marks and Spencer returned to Kirkgate Market, opening a stall alongside the centenary clock.

In 1904, Marks & Spencer relocated its Leeds branch to the then recently opened Cross Arcade (now part of the Victoria Quarter).

In 2009, over 60,000 historic artefacts concerning Marks & Spencer were relocated from London to the Centenary Gallery in the Parkinson Building at the University of Leeds.

=== A new ornate hall ===
Interior of the 1904 hall

In 1893, Leeds gained city status, which brought an increased desire amongst members of the corporation to build civic buildings that befitted this status. The area around the market was made up of abattoirs and slums making it appear less than salubrious. A design competition was held to find an architect capable of designing an opulent new hall to the front of the market. A prize of £150 was set for the winner, which (following allegations of corruption in the competition) was awarded to Joseph and John Leeming of London. Despite misgivings about the award of the design, the plans went ahead and the corporation budgeted £80,000 for building the new hall. J Bagshaw and Sons of Batley were chosen as engineers for the project.

Further controversy was generated when, in May 1901, many traders within the markets were given one week's notice to vacate their stalls so that work on the new hall could commence. Traders demanded compensation for loss of trade, fixtures and fittings.

The new hall opened in 1904, costing £116,700, somewhat more than the original budget of £80,000. A ceremony in July of that year conducted by Mr G. W. Balfour, MP for Leeds Central and President of the Board of Trade, marked the new hall's opening.

=== Second World War ===
Despite the Second World War bringing problems such as conscription and air-raids (although the latter became a rare occurrence in Leeds) the markets continued to trade, albeit on a smaller scale. Air-raid shelters were built at the site for market traders and an Air Raid Precautions (ARP) service was operated by over 100 volunteers from the market site. The Ministry of Food operated offices at the market to implement rationing. On 14 March 1941 the markets were damaged in a bombing raid on Leeds. The damage was limited and the markets continued to trade.

After the war, the Markets Committee proposed a £55,000 development at the market. New warehouses were provided as well as an open market and car parking. Twenty new butchers' shops were built, older shops were refurbished, and several older buildings were demolished.

=== 1950s and 60s development and opening of competing facilities ===
In 1956 it was found that upgrading the shops to meet modern hygiene regulations was impractical, so new shops were built creating Butchers' Row and the Fish and Game Row.

By the 1950s the market had over 400 traders and over 100,000 shoppers visited the complex every Saturday. To relieve this problem, the council bought a site off Pontefract Lane in Cross Green to accommodate a new wholesale market. This market was itself closed in 2009 over concerns that it was being used to sell counterfeit goods.

With the opening of the Merrion Centre in the 1960s the market had to compete with the newer but smaller Merrion Market (then Merrion Superstore). In recent years the Merrion Markets have closed and the Kirkgate Markets have regained their dominance in Leeds City Centre.

=== 1975 fire ===
On 13 December 1975 a fire broke out in the market hall. The cause of the fire has never been determined, although stallholders have speculated over several causes including an electrical fault and an overturned paraffin heater. Attempts made to extinguish the fire by stallholders were to prove fruitless. By the time over 100 firefighters had extinguished the fire, most of the roof had collapsed. The ornate 1904 market hall was completely undamaged by the fire and a small part of the 1875 hall survived, however an estimated £7 million worth of damage was done to other halls. Traders who had lost their stalls were accommodated in other parts of the city centre until replacement halls were built at the Kirkgate site. After only three days of closure, undamaged parts of the Markets reopened.

=== Rebuilding 1976–1981 ===
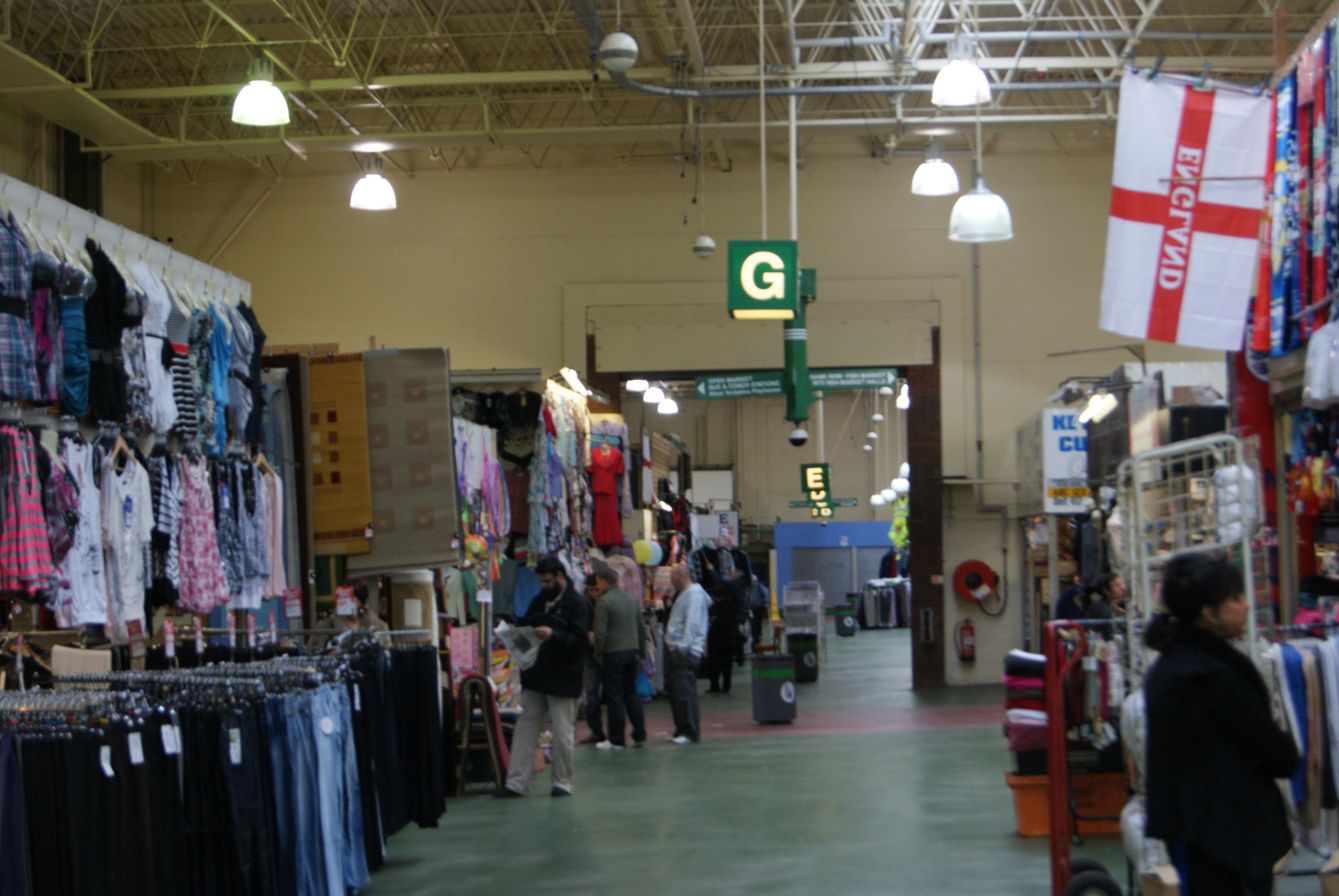
A view from the 1981 hall through to the 1976 hall.

Following the destruction of most of the market hall in the fire of 1975, significant rebuilding works had to take place in order to re-accommodate displaced traders. Shortly after the fire, in 1976, the first replacement hall opened in the north-east corner of the complex. Unlike the ornate 1904 hall or the stone-built 1875 hall (little of which remained), the 1975 hall was a large open hall, built of steel sheets with a lattice roof structure. In 1981 the second of these halls opened, built in identical style in the south-east corner of the market. The two halls appear to be one from the outside with no join, but they are separated by a dividing wall inside.

=== 1986 redevelopment proposals ===
In 1986 a proposal was put forward by Leeds City Council with Dutch developers MAB(UK) and Norwich Union as major investors. The plans involved retaining the 1875 and 1904 Halls, but replacing the rest with a new single market hall, new shops, a new bus station and multi-storey car park. The plans proved unpopular with the local population and were opposed by the Market Traders' Association and Leeds Civic Trust. Despite these misgivings the council granted the scheme planning permission and sought to push on with plans. In order to see the plans through, a compulsory purchase order was required by the council and this was refused by the Secretary of State for the Environment. The plans were formally dropped in 1990, leaving the council again with the dilemma of what to do with the increasingly dilapidated market halls

=== 1991 refurbishment ===
Following the cancellation of the 1986 proposals, a new solution was sought. Leeds City Council, again with Norwich Union as investors, proposed a more modest refurbishment plan which was soon formally approved. Work commenced in 1991. The exterior stonework and lead roof were repaired and adjoining shops were rebuilt. The entrances to the 1904 hall were refurbished with ornate iron work in keeping with the original design. The previously underused upper floors were refurbished to provide modern office space. The 1904 hall was redecorated in line with its original style and new stalls were built in a similar style. The services to the buildings were modernised with new electric and water supplies installed, along with new fire and security services. Drainage and ventilation to the building were also improved.

The refurbishment works were set back in 1992 after a fire broke out in one of the domes at the Vicar Lane end of the 1904 hall, resulting in the dome having to be rebuilt.

Following this refurbishment Kirkgate Market was upgraded from a Grade II to a Grade I listed building.

=== 1995 refurbishment ===
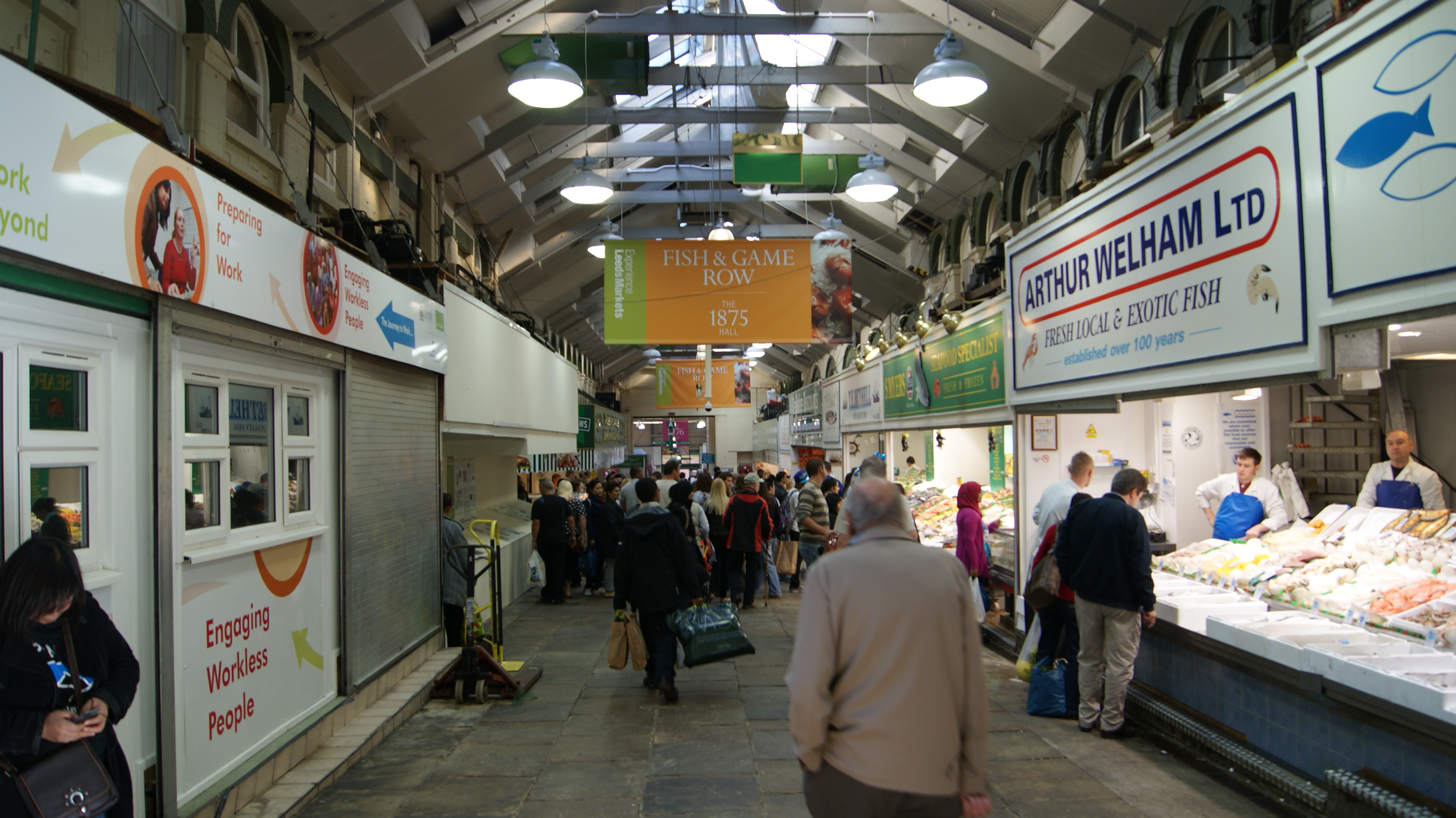
Fish and Game Row was refurbished in the 1995 round.

By the 1990s it was becoming apparent that the parts of the 1875 hall to survive the 1975 fire were becoming increasingly dilapidated. Work began repairing this area in 1995. The roof, which had fallen into significant disrepair was repaired and the internal stonework was refurbished in keeping with the original Victorian style of the hall.

=== 1996 developments ===
In 1996 the outdoor market was redeveloped with new market stalls being erected, along with a new central square. At about this time a new bus station was built at the eastern end of the outdoor market and a new multi-storey car park was built to the southern side of the outdoor market.

== Buildings ==
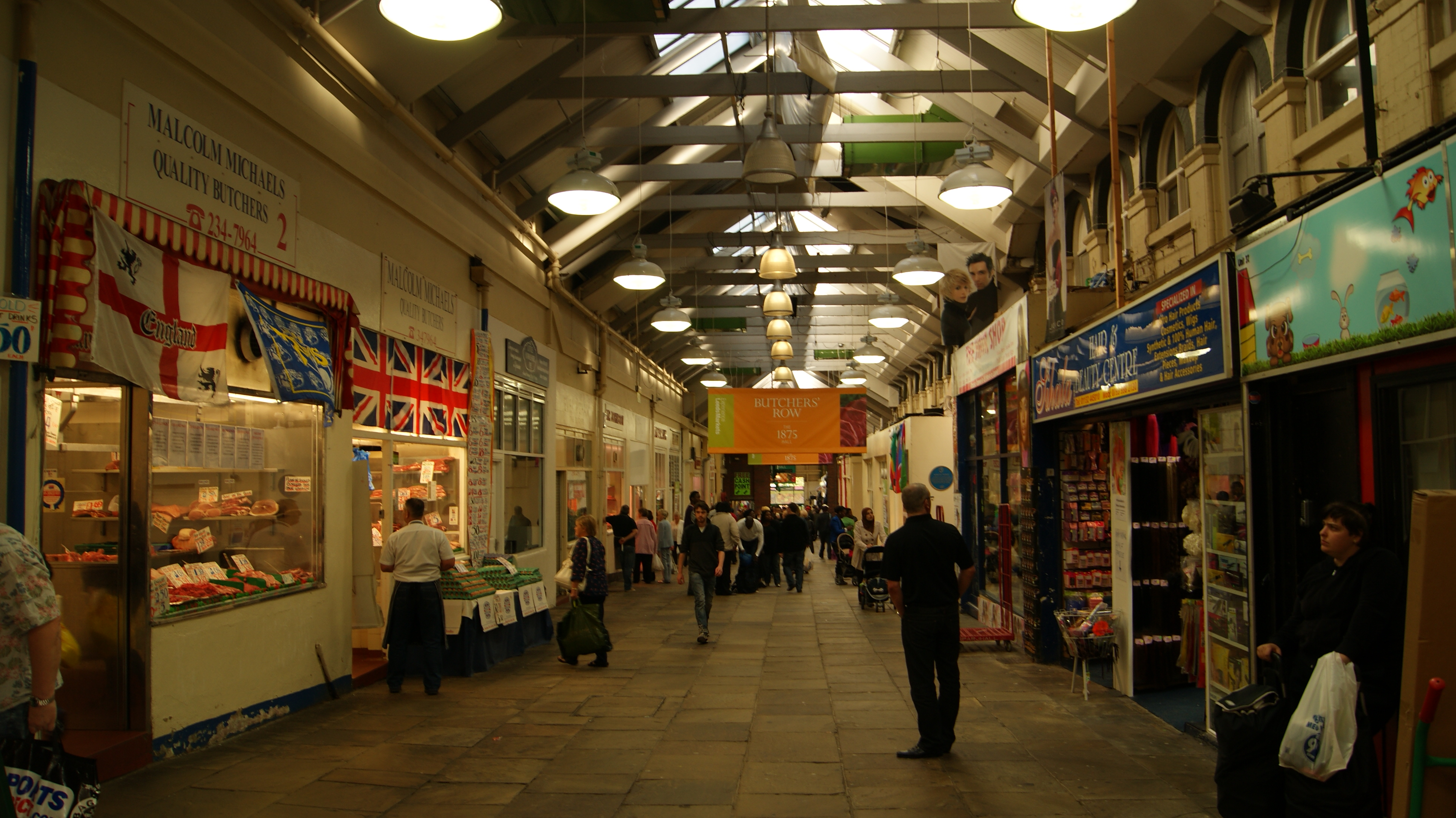
Butchers' Row, 1875 Hall

The current building frontage opened in 1904. Fire ravaged the rear halls in December 1975 and these were rebuilt soon after, giving the rear halls a more modern open-plan feel, albeit lacking the character of the 1904 hall. To the very rear of the site there is an outdoor market. Crammed in between the 1904 hall and the rear modern halls is the oldest hall, from 1875, which contains both Butchers' Row and Fish and Game Row. The 1875 hall is not an open hall, as the others but acts as a series of passages between the 1904 hall and the more modern 1976 and 1981 halls.

=== 1875 Hall ===
The 1875 Hall is situated between the 1904 hall and the later 1976 and 1981 halls. To the northern end of this hall is Butchers' Row which leads to the 1976 Hall; to the southern end is Fish and Game Row, which leads to the 1981 Hall. In between the two rows, various stalls are situated and can be accessed from the rear of the 1904 hall. The 1875 hall can only be accessed via the other four halls and has no entrances from the street of its own. Little of the 1875 Hall can be seen from the outside except from above. Prior to the fire of 1975, much more of the 1875 hall existed; the fire however caused much of this to completely collapse, hence the hall's disjointed feel these days.

=== 1904 Hall ===
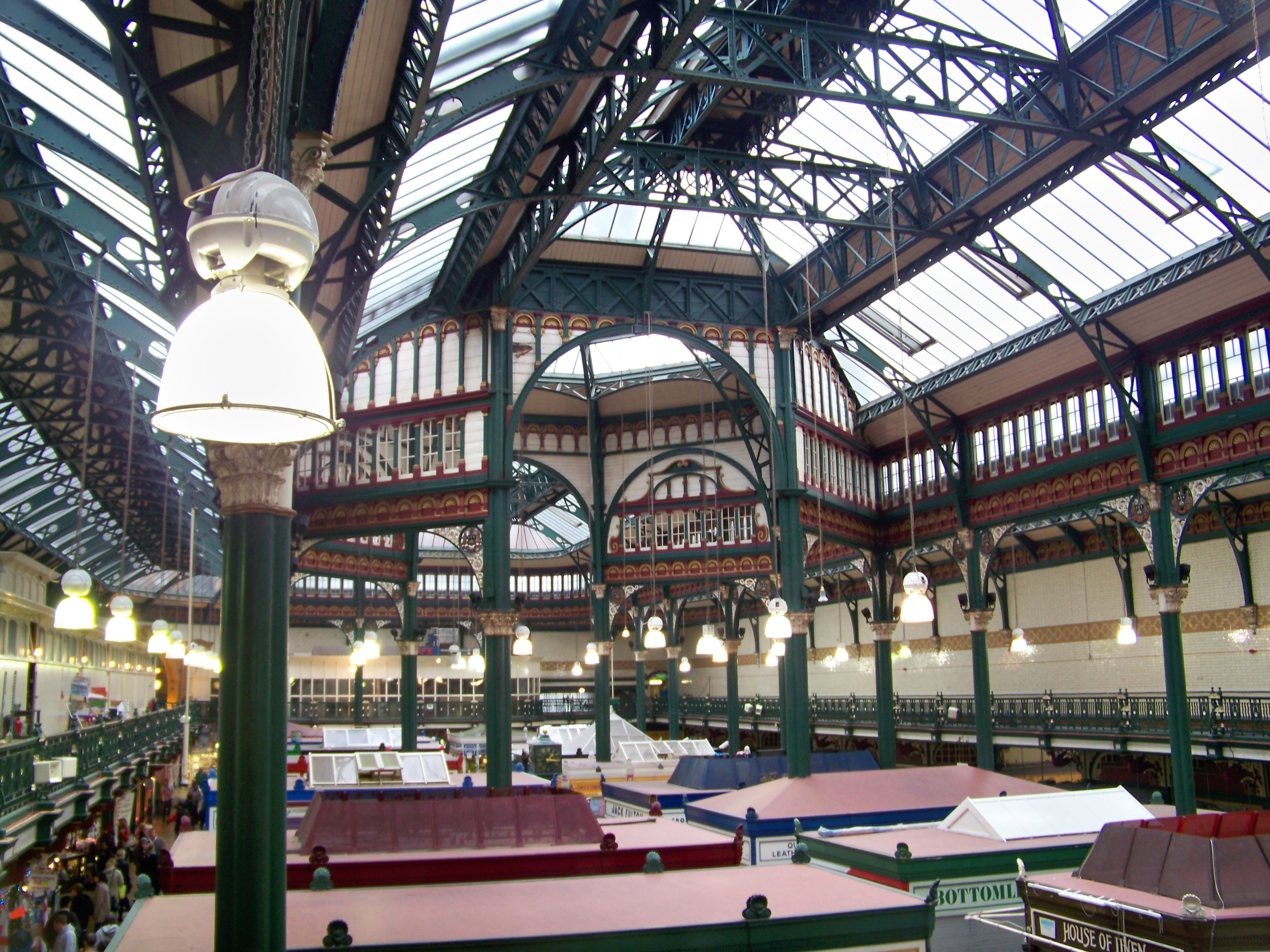
The 1904 Hall seen from the balcony

The 1904 Hall is the most ornate of the halls and is situated at the front of the complex. The hall has a glass roof and is surrounded by a balcony, which runs the full perimeter of the hall. The roof and balcony are supported by a cast-iron internal structure. The exterior of the hall is ornately decorated in a Flemish/Art Nouveau style and provides the main entrances to the complex. The hall contains a mixture of stalls and connects to the 1976 and 1981 halls via the 1875 Hall. In the centre of the hall is the Market Clock, a replacement for the original which now stands in Oakwood. The front is lined with shops facing Vicar Lane, while the upper floors which run in a 'U' shape along the northern, southern and western sides, contain private offices. The 1904 hall is the only part of the complex to survive the 1975 fire in its entirety. The hall was first listed in 1973.

=== 1976 Hall ===
The 1976 Hall is connected to the older halls via Butchers' Row. It replaced earlier buildings destroyed in the 1975 fire. It is a large open-plan hall, constructed from sheet steel with a lattice roof structure. Unlike earlier halls it has no supporting pillars. From the outside it is indistinguishable from the 1981 hall, but is separated by a dividing wall. There are a variety of different stall types in this hall.

=== 1981 Hall ===
The 1981 hall is situated in the south-eastern corner of the complex and is almost identical to the 1975 hall from which it is separated by a partition wall. Like the 1975 hall, a variety of different types of stall holders occupy this hall.

=== Outdoor Market ===
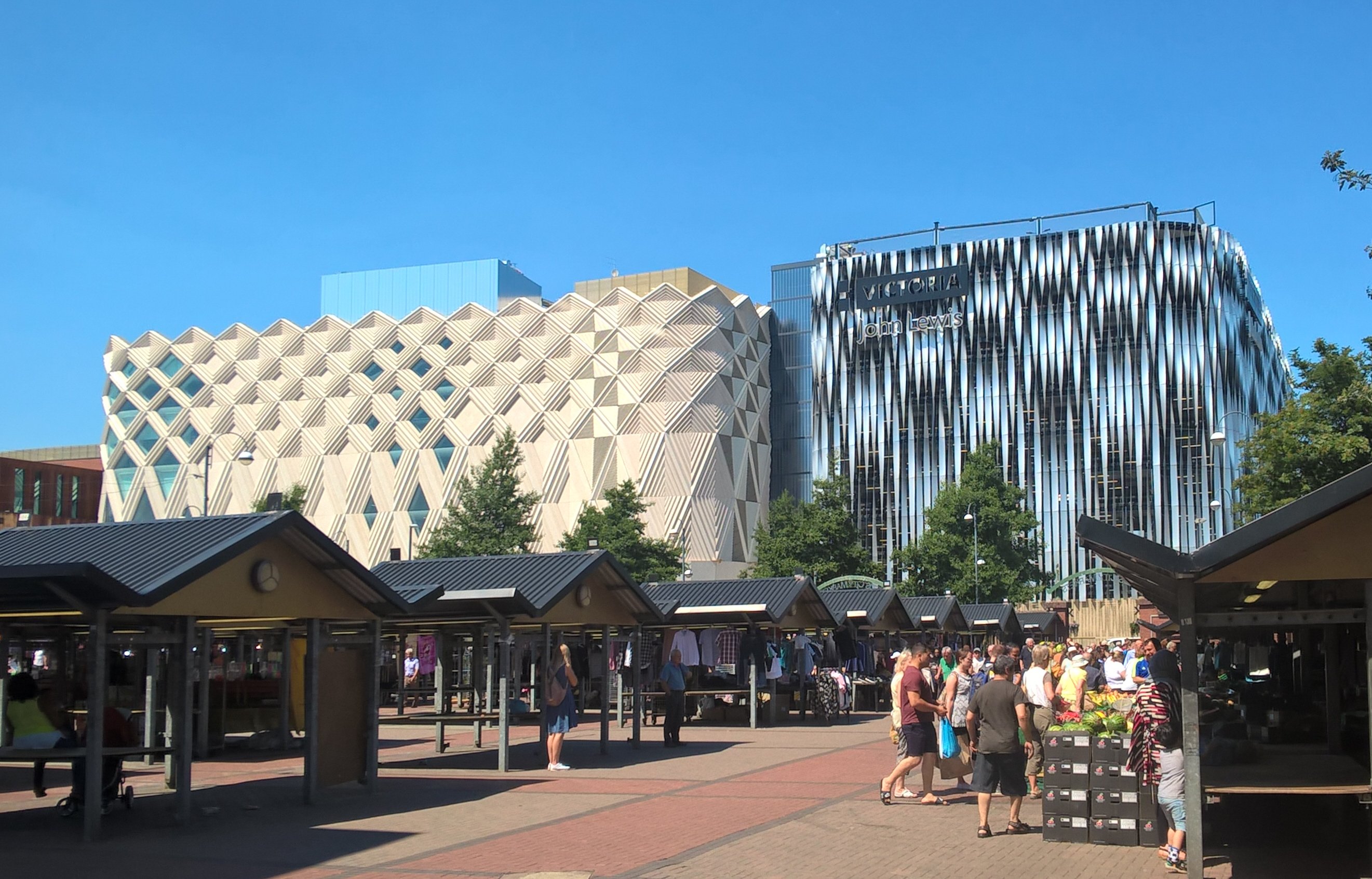
The Outdoor Market with 2016's Victoria Leeds in the background

The open market situated to the rear is accessible via the 1976 and 1981 halls. There are three blocks of stalls, denoted by the colour of their roofs (blue, red and yellow) with green-roofed stalls at the bottom. The open market is surrounded by a brick wall, with lockable gates. A variety of types of stallholders occupy the open market. Towards the bottom end it is mostly occupied by greengrocers, however the other rows include many stalls selling electrical goods, computers and clothing.

== See also ==
- Architecture of Leeds
- Grade I listed buildings in West Yorkshire
- Listed buildings in Leeds (City and Hunslet Ward - northern area)
