= Leeds Civic Trust =

Voluntary organisation and registered charity

Coordinates: 53.7952°N 1.5380°W

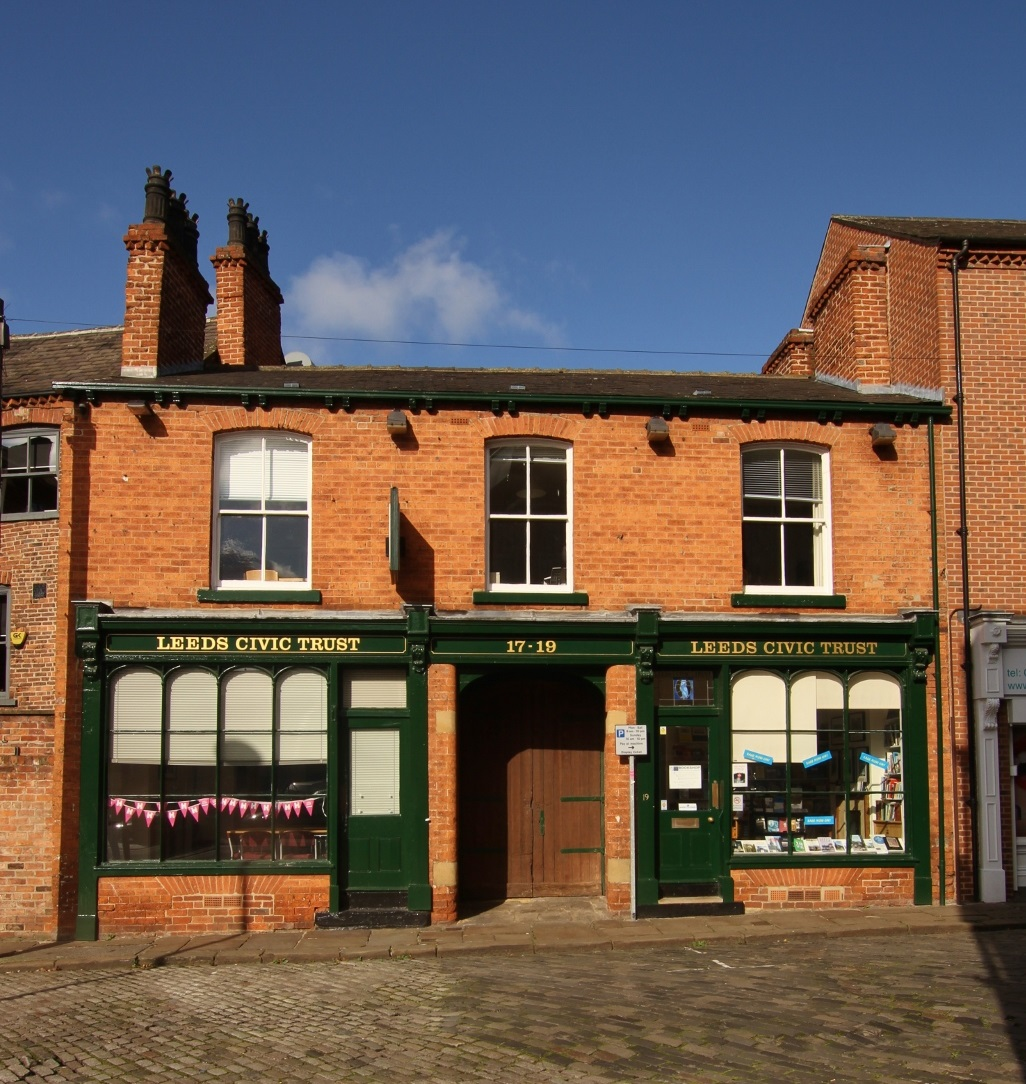
- Offices at 17–19 Wharf Street
- Formation: October 25, 1965; 60 years ago
- Type: Registered charity; Civic society
- Registration no.: 2742348
- Legal status: Company limited by guarantee
- Headquarters: 17–19 Wharf Street
- Location: Leeds LS2 7EQ
- Director: Martin Hamilton
- Chair of Trustees: Jenna Strover
- Publication: Outlook and "The Owl"
- Affiliations: The Yorkshire and Humber Association of Civic Societies; Civic Voice
- Staff: 7
- Website: leedscivictrust.org.uk

Leeds Civic Trust is a voluntary organisation and registered charity established in Leeds, West Yorkshire, England in 1965. Affiliated to the national charity Civic Voice, its stated purpose is "to stimulate public interest in and care for the beauty, history, and character of the city and locality, to encourage high standards of design, architecture and town planning; [and] to encourage the development and improvement of features of general public amenity".

The Trust is independent, funded by public membership, grants, and donations. In addition to its campaigning and educational roles, the Trust comments on planning applications and takes part in planning policy consultations. Other activities include operation of an extensive blue plaque scheme across the city, and the annual organisation of Heritage Open Days at local sites. It has an office on Wharf Street.

== History ==
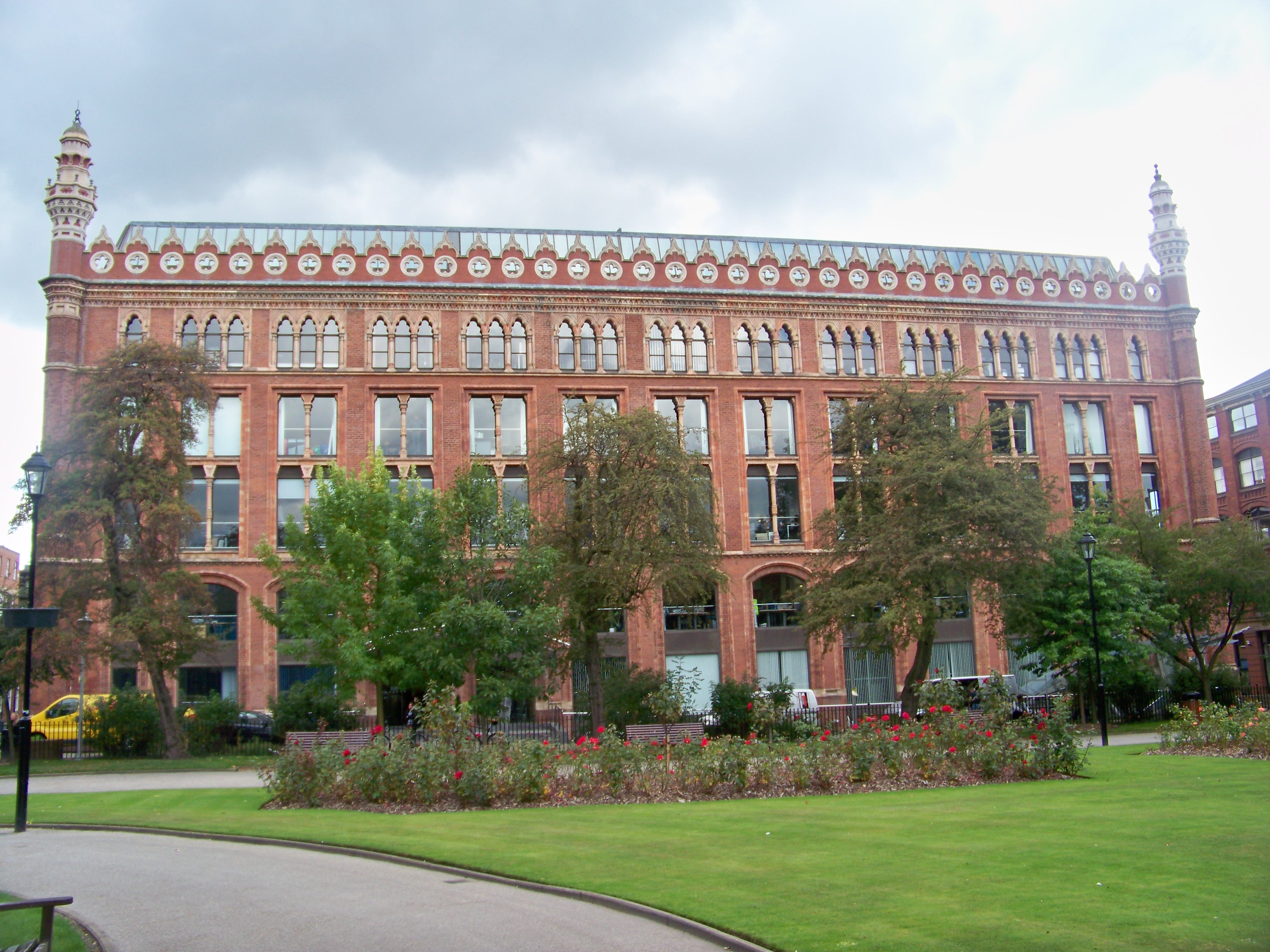
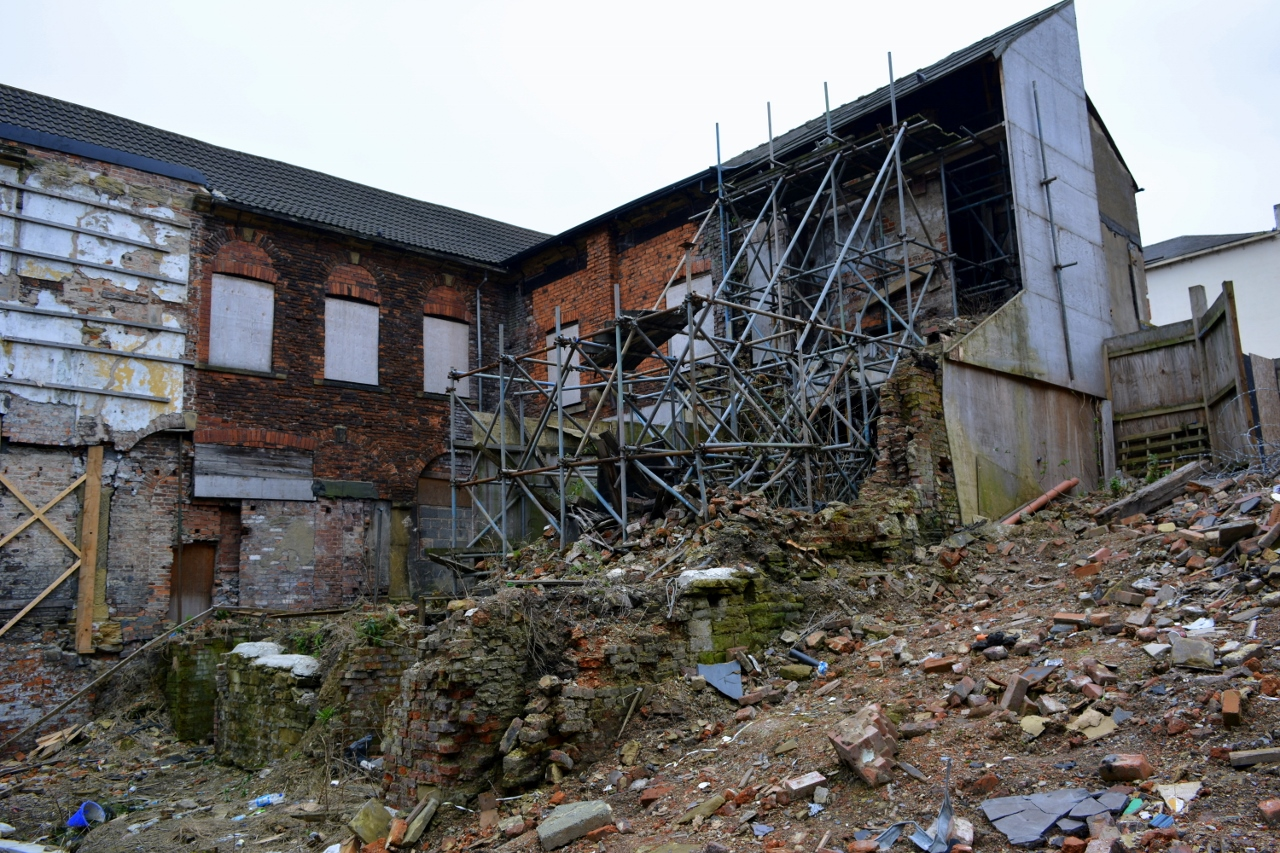
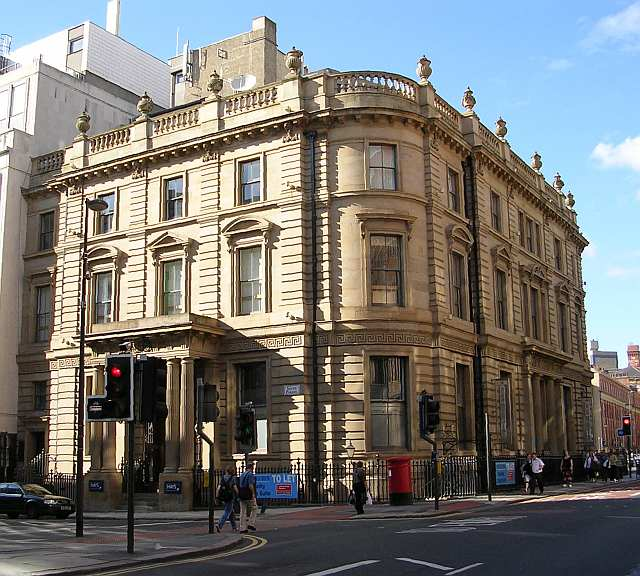
From top: St Pauls House, First White Cloth Hall, and former Bank of England

The Civic Trust of England, now defunct, established a Leeds branch in 1965 as a response to the attitude it saw the city as having towards historic buildings. The city was in the midst of a transformation as new urban motorways were built (Leeds later branded itself as "Motorway City of the 70s"), including the Inner Ring Road and M621. As part of similar modernisation, old buildings in the city centre, Hunslet and Holbeck were "swept away regardless of their historic value", and the 1964 demolition of Gilbert Scott's Beckett's Bank on Park Row proved one too many.

The Trust was set up with a £50,000 donation from Charles Crabtree, a printing press manufacturer on Water Lane, Holbeck.

By the 1970s, local newspapers were reporting action to save the city's historic buildings as a consequence of lobbying by the Trust. It surveyed every street in the city formed a Heritage at Risk register, with the aim of conserving and preventing the deterioration and demolition of built heritage. The director, Dr Kevin Grady, told the Yorkshire Evening Post in 1971 "we want to identify and highlight buildings at risk of disappearing for any number of reasons - perhaps they are in bad physical condition, or empty ... if a building is neglected it can end up being demolished because it is beyond repair which is how a lot of listed buildings are lost". The Trust avoided conflicts of interest between conservationists and developers by encouraging property owners to seek advice on renovating their buildings and obtaining grants.

It also began to outline a vision of improvements to the city; in 1979 Olav Arnold presented a conference pitch in which he declared Boar Lane a "disaster zone" and the Inner Ring Road "just a litter track", and advocated for a new image as a tourist centre to challenge York and Harrogate, building on undeveloped rough sites, reviving the canals, and more parks and trees.

With proactive campaigns from the 1960s until the present and declarations such as "What we build today is tomorrow's heritage" and "Conserving the best of the past", Leeds Civic Trust has been instrumental in conservation decisions across the city. Buildings it has saved from demolition or insensitive alteration include St Pauls House in Park Square, the former Bank of England on South Parade, the Third White Cloth Hall, Kirkgate Market, and the unified south side of Boar Lane.

The Trust runs the Lower Kirkgate Townscape Heritage Initiative, which collects historical information about the quarter and advocates for the preservation of historic buildings, such as the First White Cloth Hall (1711).

In 2013, volunteers began surveying all 3,000 Grade II listed buildings in the Leeds District, with the goal of creating a photographic and written record of the external condition of each building.

== Activities ==
The Trust works with Leeds City Council, the Chamber of Commerce, the Business Improvement District (LeedsBID), and other partners on many projects while maintaining a "critical friend" relationship with these and other stakeholders. Campaigns and activities include:

- Heritage - maintenance of the Heritage at Risk register to stimulate action on listed and unlisted buildings that are considered worthy of preservation. Buildings listed on the register are either Urgent (immediate structural danger) or At Risk (vulnerable through neglect and decay).
  - An annual fortnight of Heritage Open Days - This festival of history and culture coordinated across England by the National Trust is arranged locally by Leeds Civic Trust as its flagship heritage event each year. Attractions throughout the city open their doors to the public; there are also lectures and guided walks.
- Transport - A subcommittee meets to campaign for improved transport in Leeds. It advances the view that public transport options should be installed before new homes are completed, thus reducing new residents' dependence on automobiles.
- Planning - The Planning Committee convenes every two weeks to review development in the city, and make recommendations to new and current planning applications. Interested parties such as council officers, architects, and developers often attend and contribute to these meetings.
- Publishing - A small number of books about the history of Leeds have been published by the Trust, including A History of Kirkgate, Blue Plaques of Leeds, Edwardian Leeds in Postcards, and a series of four pamphlets with self-guided walks.
- Special events - Public events organised in 2019 included "Leeds in Your Lunch Hour" short lectures, debates on The Leeds Look, a panel discussion about the future of railways in Leeds, and a talk from the social historian John Boughton about 20th-century council housing and the former City Architect, RAH Livett.
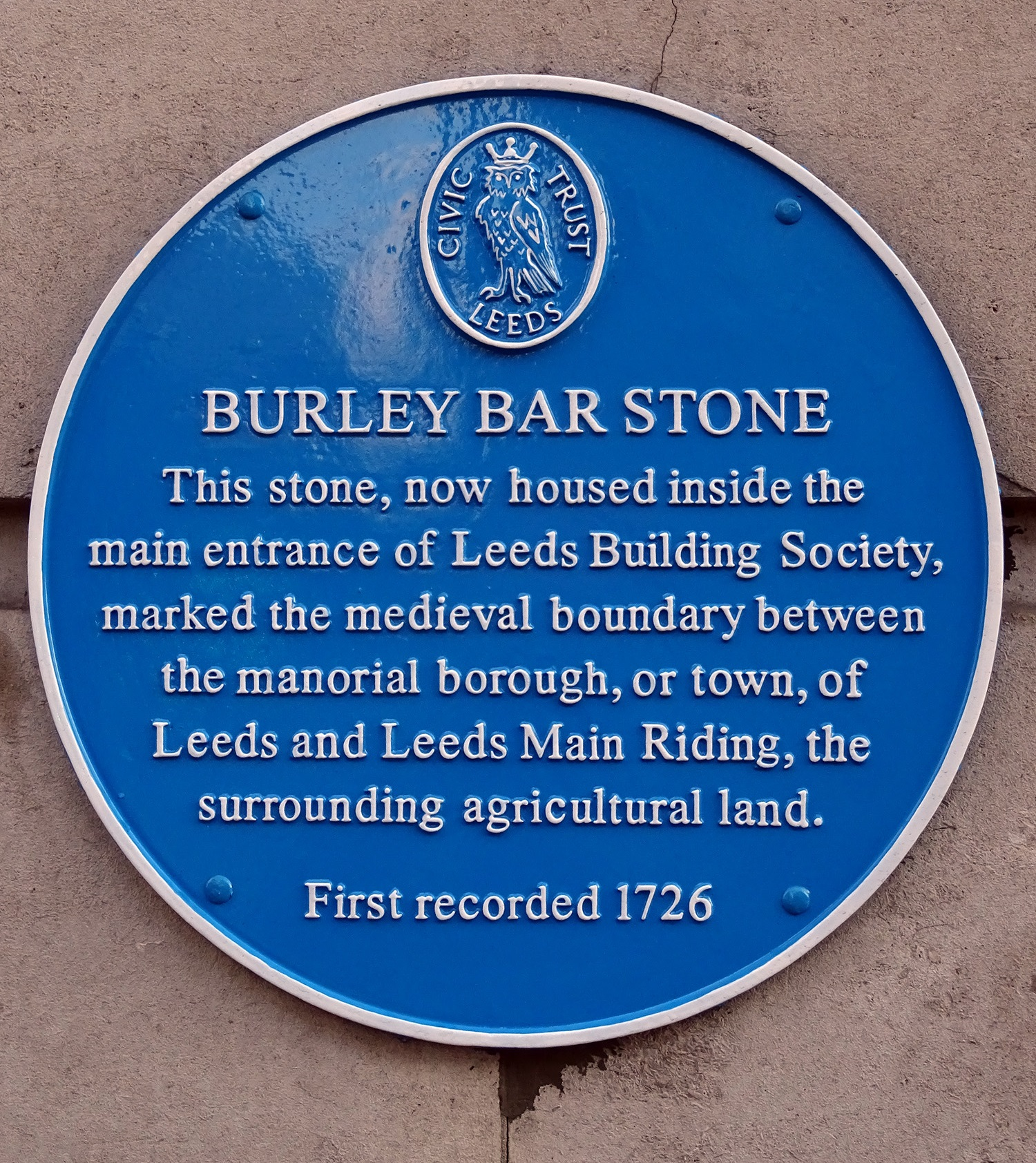
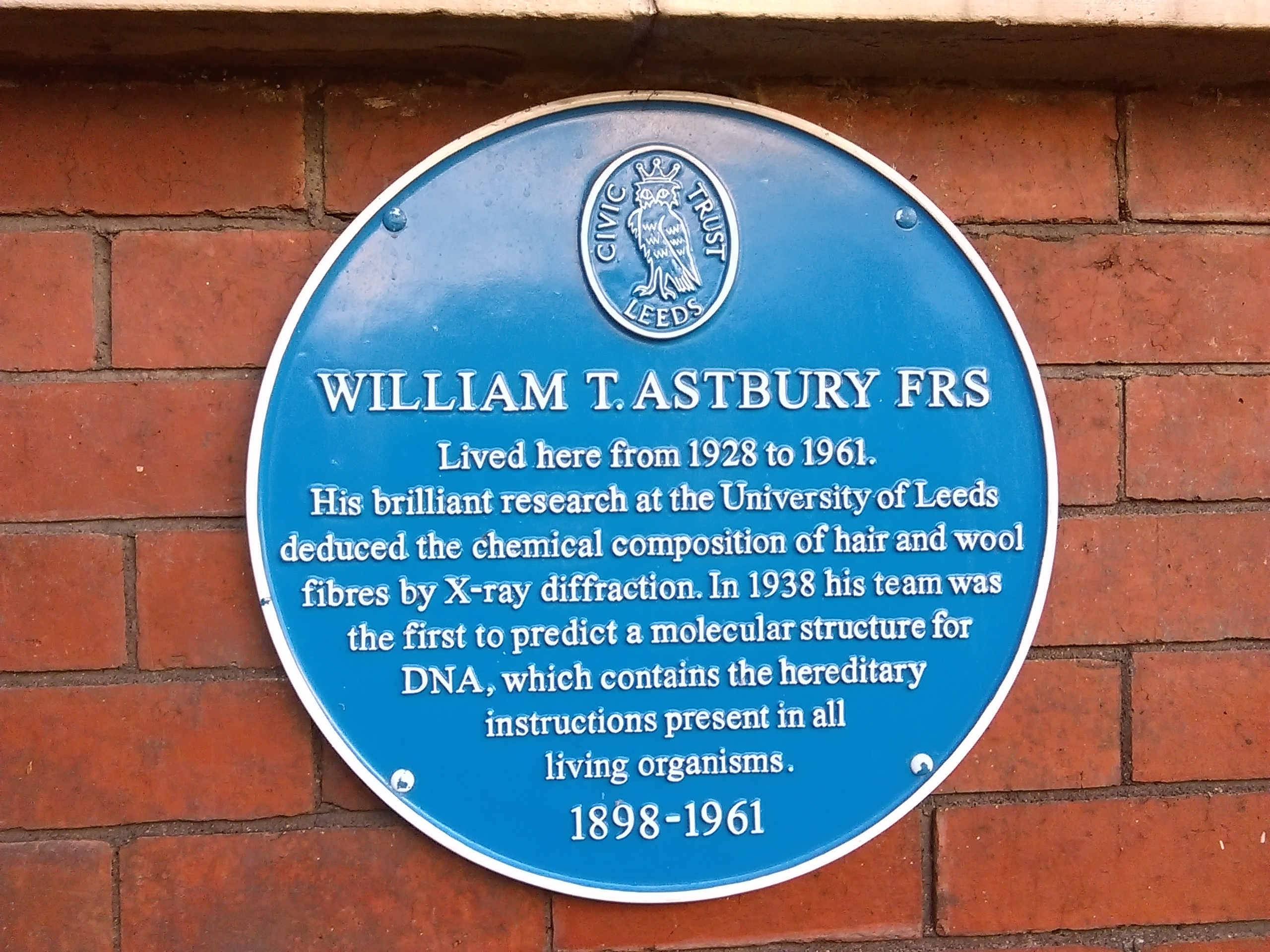
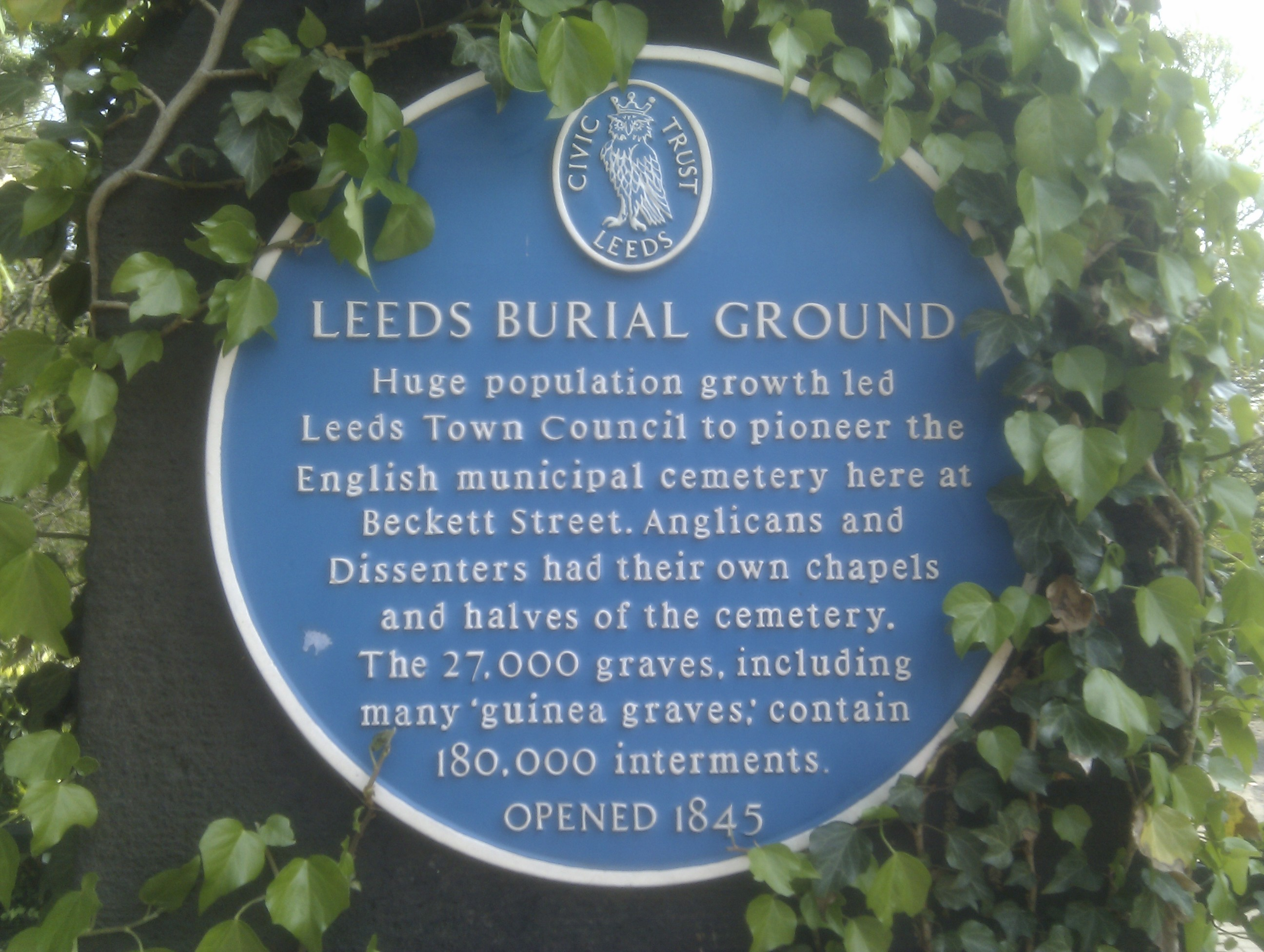
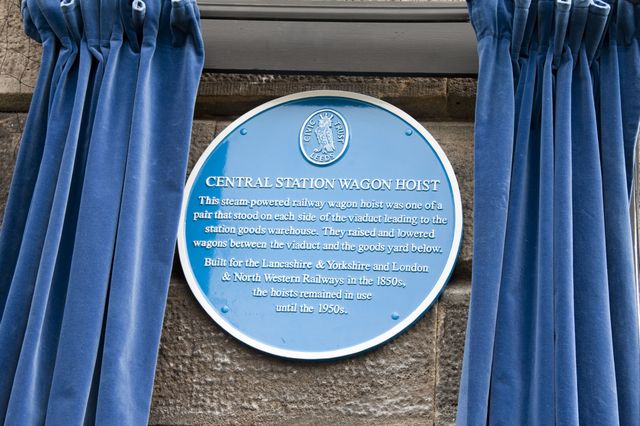
Clockwise from top left: Blue plaques at Burley Bar Stone, Kirkstall Lane, Central station wagon hoist, and Beckett Street Cemetery

Unlike similar civic societies in the UK, Leeds Civic Trust does not own or operate any historic property (save for its own offices and the Bear Pit on Cardigan Road, which it has restored) or museums in the city. It works as an event organiser and pressure group for conservation and to continue good design quality in new-builds.

=== Blue plaques ===
Leeds Civic Trust started its blue plaque scheme in 1987 and by March 2020 2019 it had 180 plaques. They can be suggested by the public and sponsored by organisations. Before commemorating a person or building, it is given objective evaluation against specific criteria to ensure it is of high significance. The Blue Plaques record the impact of significant persons in the city's history. The first plaque, the Burley Bar Stone, was unveiled in November 1987 marking one of the medieval gates of Leeds, the stone itself surviving within the building of the Leeds Building Society on Albion Street. The West Bar and East Bar were also marked, and in 2017 the 164th plaque marked the North Bar. All plaques are monitored by members and those in very poor condition are returned to the manufacturer for repainting.

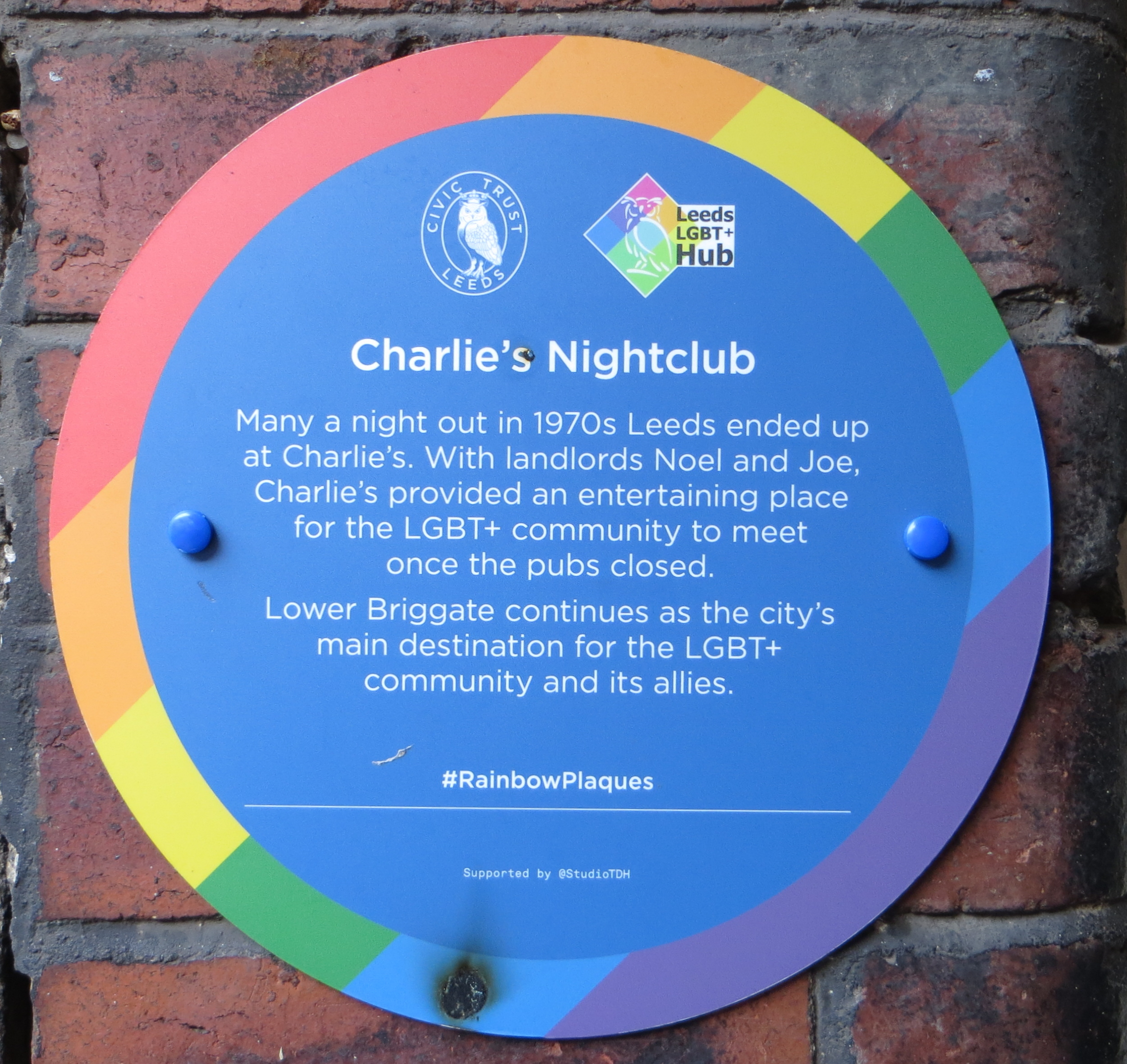
Rainbow plaque at Charlie's Nightclub, Briggate

In association with the 2018 Leeds Pride event, the Trust created a trail of Rainbow Plaques to commemorate individuals, significant places and events which have contributed to the LGBT+ history of Leeds.

Caryl Philips unveiling a Leeds Civic Trust Blue Plaque to David Oluwale

On 25 April 2022 Leeds Civic Trust and the David Oluwale Memorial Association organising the unveiling of a blue plaque by Caryl Phillips on Leeds Bridge, commemorating the death of David Oluwale. Hours later the plaque was stolen and West Yorkshire Police established a hate crime investigation. A temporary replacement plaque was damaged days later.

== See also ==
- List of Leeds Civic Trust plaques
- Listed buildings in Leeds
- Architecture of Leeds
- History of Leeds
