= Schouwburgplein =

== Belgium ==
- Schouwburgplein in Kortrijk

== The Netherlands ==
- Schouwburgplein in Rotterdam
