= 2nd White Cloth Hall =

Market building in Leeds, England

Coordinates: 53°47′33″N 1°32′32″W

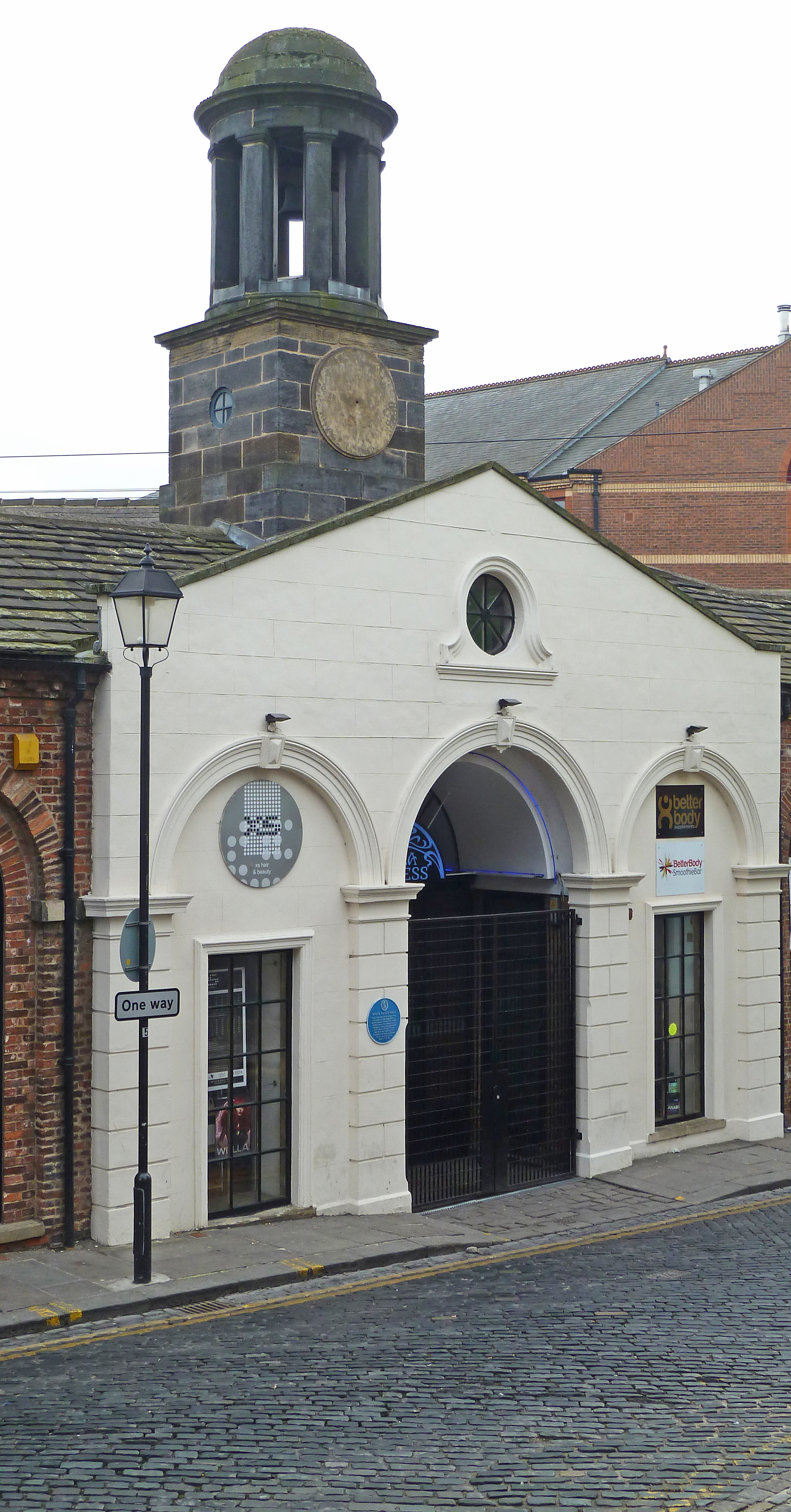
Cupola of the 2nd White Cloth Hall on the roof of its successor building

The 2nd White Cloth hall was a marketplace for the sale of undyed cloth in Holbeck, Leeds, West Yorkshire, England.

It was built south of the river, between Meadow Lane and Hunslet Lane in 1756 to replace the 1st White Cloth Hall of 1711. The 2nd cloth hall was much larger than its predecessor but it only served 20 years until the construction of the enormous 3rd White Cloth Hall.

The building was demolished in 1786, only 30 years after its construction. The only part of the building to survive was the cupola which was transferred to the 3rd White Cloth Hall.

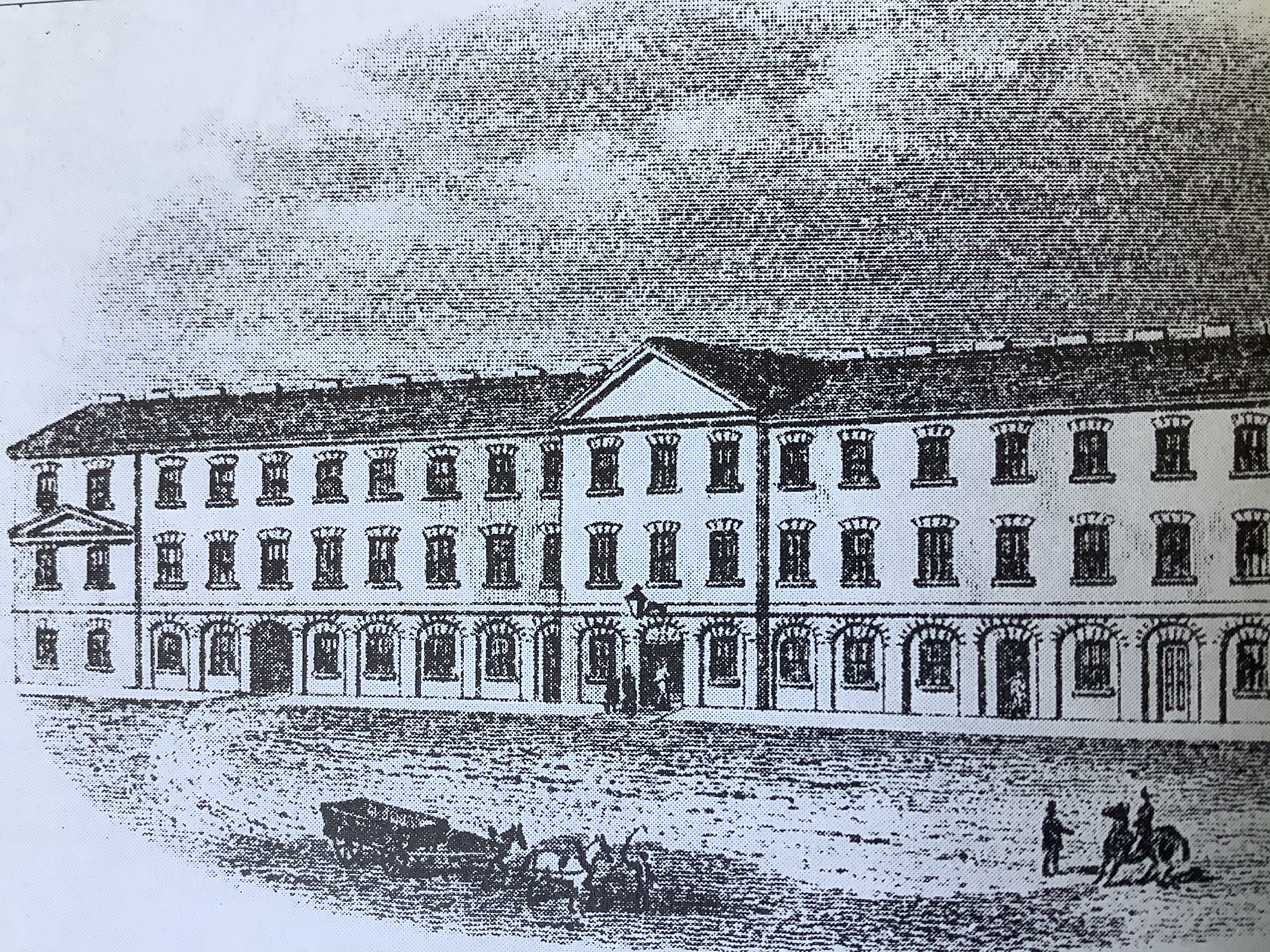
Illustration of 2nd Cloth Hall, location Hunslet Lane / Meadow Lane, built 1756.

== See also ==
- 1st White Cloth Hall
- 3rd White Cloth Hall
- 4th White Cloth Hall
