= 4th White Cloth Hall =

Market building in Leeds, England

Coordinates: 53°47′49.6″N 1°33′2.3″W

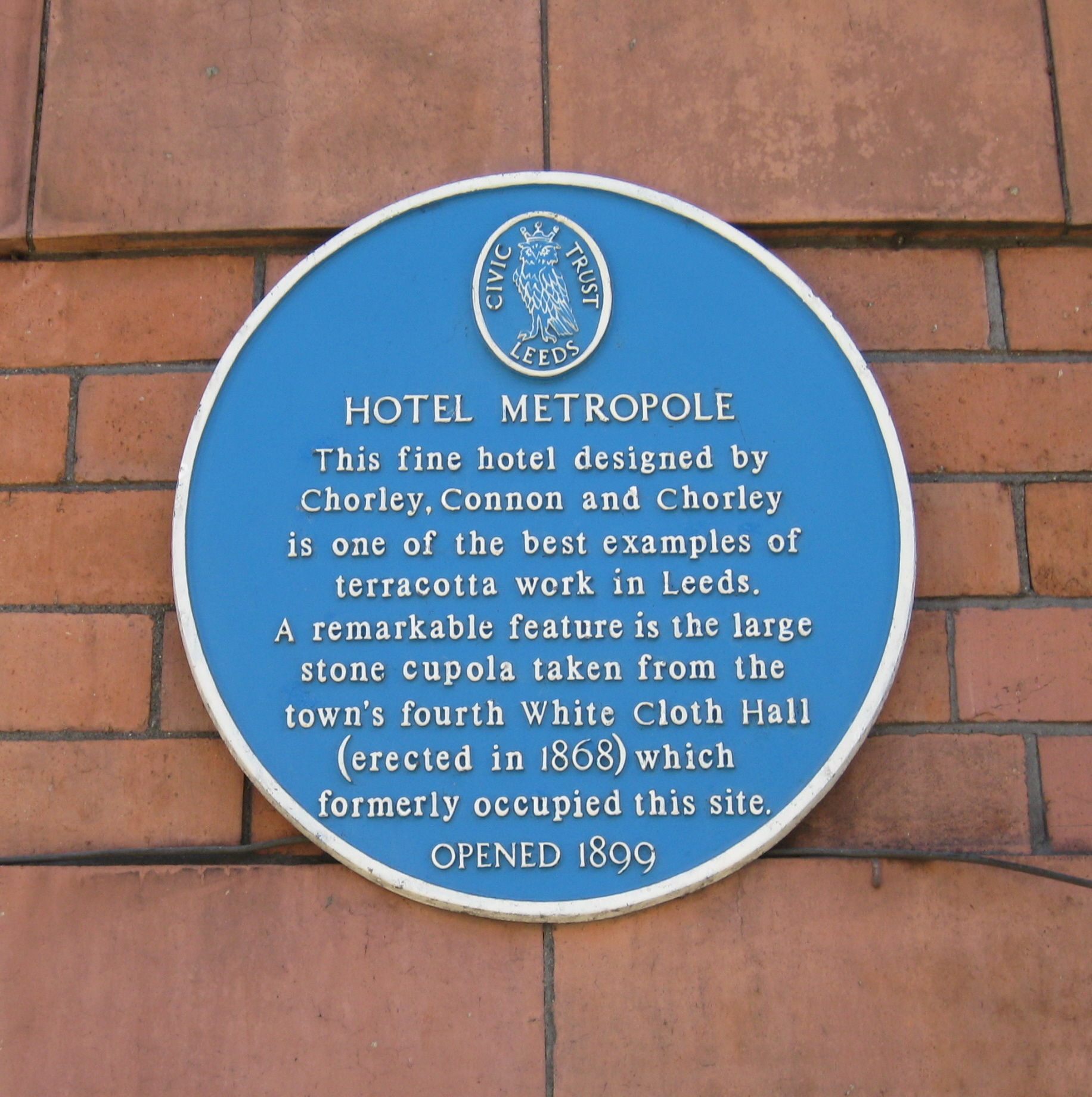
Blue plaque

The 4th White Cloth Hall was a market for the sale of undyed cloth on King Street in Leeds city centre in England. A blue plaque for the building can be found on the nearby Quebec Street.

The 4th White Cloth hall was built in 1868 by the North Eastern Railway company to replace the 3rd White Cloth Hall that they had had to partly demolish in 1865 to build the impressive North Eastern Viaduct to access the New Station.

The building did not last long, due to the decline in cloth manufacturing in Yorkshire. It was never fully used, and was demolished in 1895. Today the site is occupied by the Hotel Metropole. Like the 2nd White Cloth Hall, the building's cupola was retained, and was built into the Metropole's roof.

== See also ==
- 1st White Cloth Hall
- 2nd White Cloth Hall
- 3rd White Cloth Hall
