= The Met Hotel =

Grade II listed hotel in Leeds, West Yorkshire, England

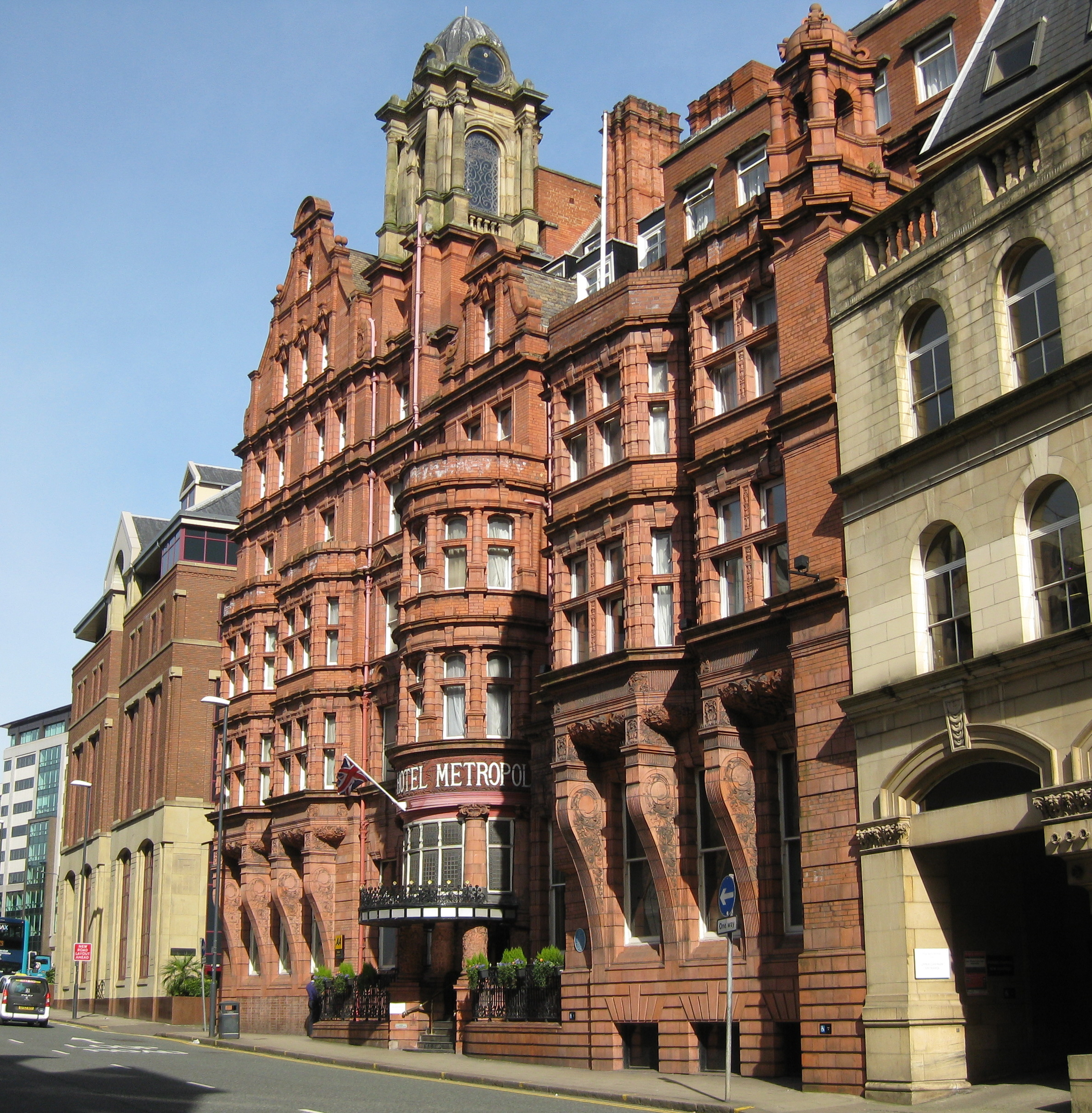
- Interactive map of the The Met Hotel area

General information
- Location: King Street, Leeds, West Yorkshire, England
- Coordinates: 53.796678°N 1.550327°W
- Opening: 1899
- Operator: Principal Hotel Company

Design and construction
- Architects: Chorley and Connon

Website
- https://www.phcompany.com/principal/leeds-met-hotel/

The Met Hotel is a Grade II listed building situated on King Street in Leeds, West Yorkshire, England. Designed by Leeds-based architects Harry Sutton Chorley and J.W. Connon, the hotel opened in 1899 as the Hotel Metropole. The Principal Hayley Group renovated the hotel in 2005, at a cost of £6 million, and changed the name to the trendier sounding 'The Met'. It has four stars and it has 120 rooms.

The Hotel Metropole is a listed building, principally because of its rare and remarkable Victorian terracotta facade. The cupola on the roof was taken from the demolished 4th White Cloth Hall, built in 1868 on the same site.

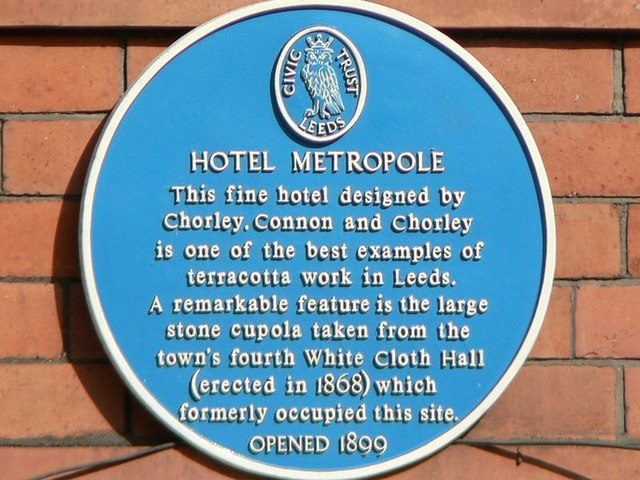
Blue Plaque, The Metropole, King Street, Leeds

== Television ==
- The hotel served as the fictional 'Marble Arch Hotel' in the hit 1991 miniseries The Darling Buds of May.
