= Schouwburgplein, Kortrijk =

Coordinates: 50°49′40″N 3°15′55″E

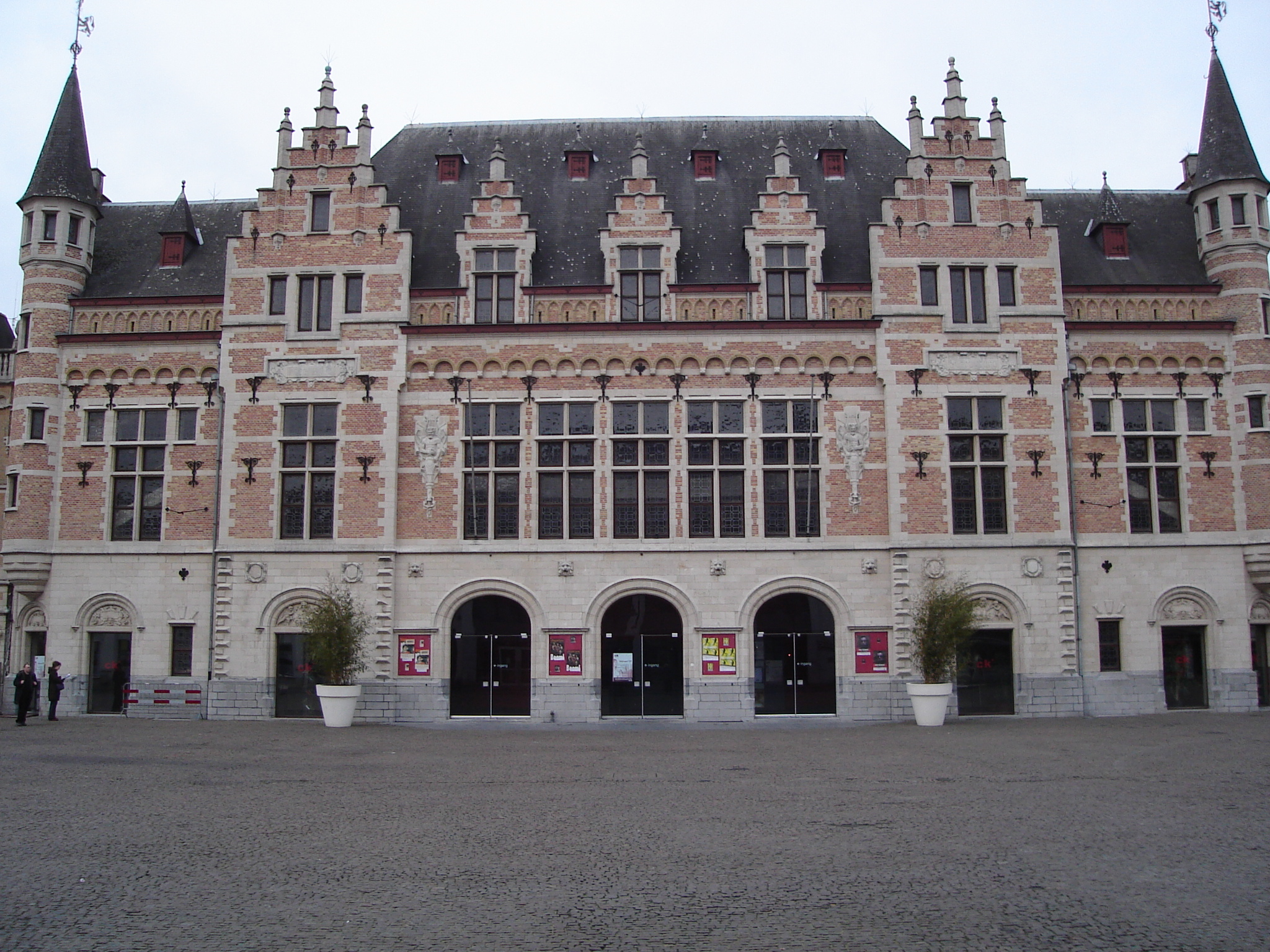
City Theatre (Stadsschouwburg) on the northern side of the Schouwburgplein.

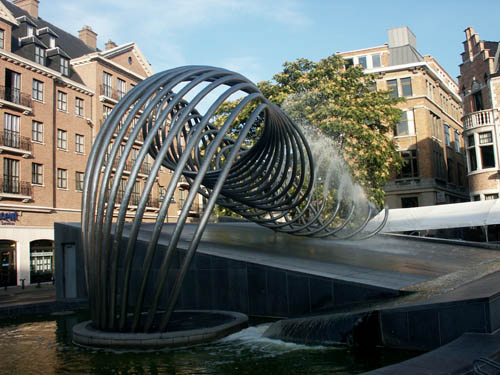
Fountain De Golf on top of the entrance to the underground car park.

The Schouwburgplein (Theatre Square) is situated in the heart of the city of Kortrijk, Belgium, and is flanked by the municipal theatre (Stadsschouwburg) and several historic buildings. The rectangular square was formed after the demolition of the old Lakenhalle (Clothes Hall) (built in 1411), which was severely damaged by friendly fire in 1944.

The square is situated between the Doorniksestraat and the Havermarkt and occupies an area of 5,060 square metres. Today, the square is a pedestrian area with several bars and outdoor cafés. Underneath the square there is a large parking garage, which was built in 1993.

On top of the entrance to this parking garage, there is a curved fountain, De Golf ("the Wave"), sculpted by the artist Olivier Strebelle.

== Literature ==
- Despriet, Philippe, Noodopgravingen aan het Kortrijkse Schouwburgplein, Groeninghe drukkerij, Kortrijk, 1994, 176pp.
- Van Hoonacker, Egied, Duizend Kortrijkse straten, N.V. Vonksteen, Langemark, 1986, 591pp.
