= 1st White Cloth Hall =

Cloth hall in Leeds, West Yorkshire, England

Coordinates: 53.79548°N 1.540446°W

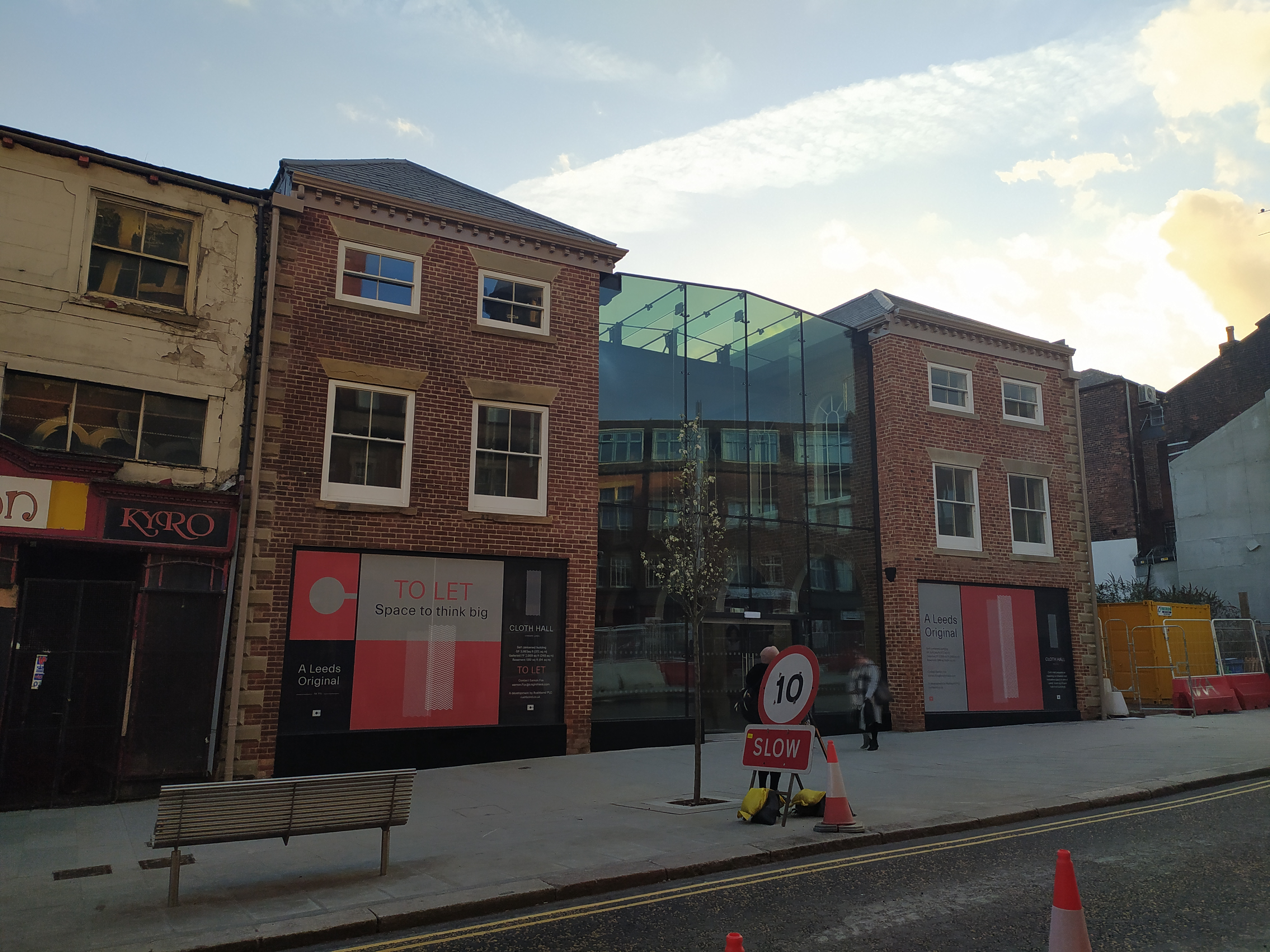
First White Cloth Hall in 2022

The 1st White Cloth Hall is a Grade II* listed building on Kirkgate, in the city centre of Leeds in West Yorkshire, England. It was built in 1711 for trading in undyed (white) cloth and now houses businesses including a restaurant, Moods.

== History ==
Originally named The White Cloth Hall, it was opened in 1711 as a response to the merchants of Wakefield building a covered cloth hall in 1710 in order to entice traders away from Leeds. It was built on Kirkgate on a site provided by Lord Irvine of Temple Newsam with £1,000 given by merchants and tradesmen. The building was described at the time as 'built upon Pillars and Arches in the form of an Exchange, with a Quadrangular Court within'.

The 1st White Cloth Hall was Grade II* listed on 16 June 1983.

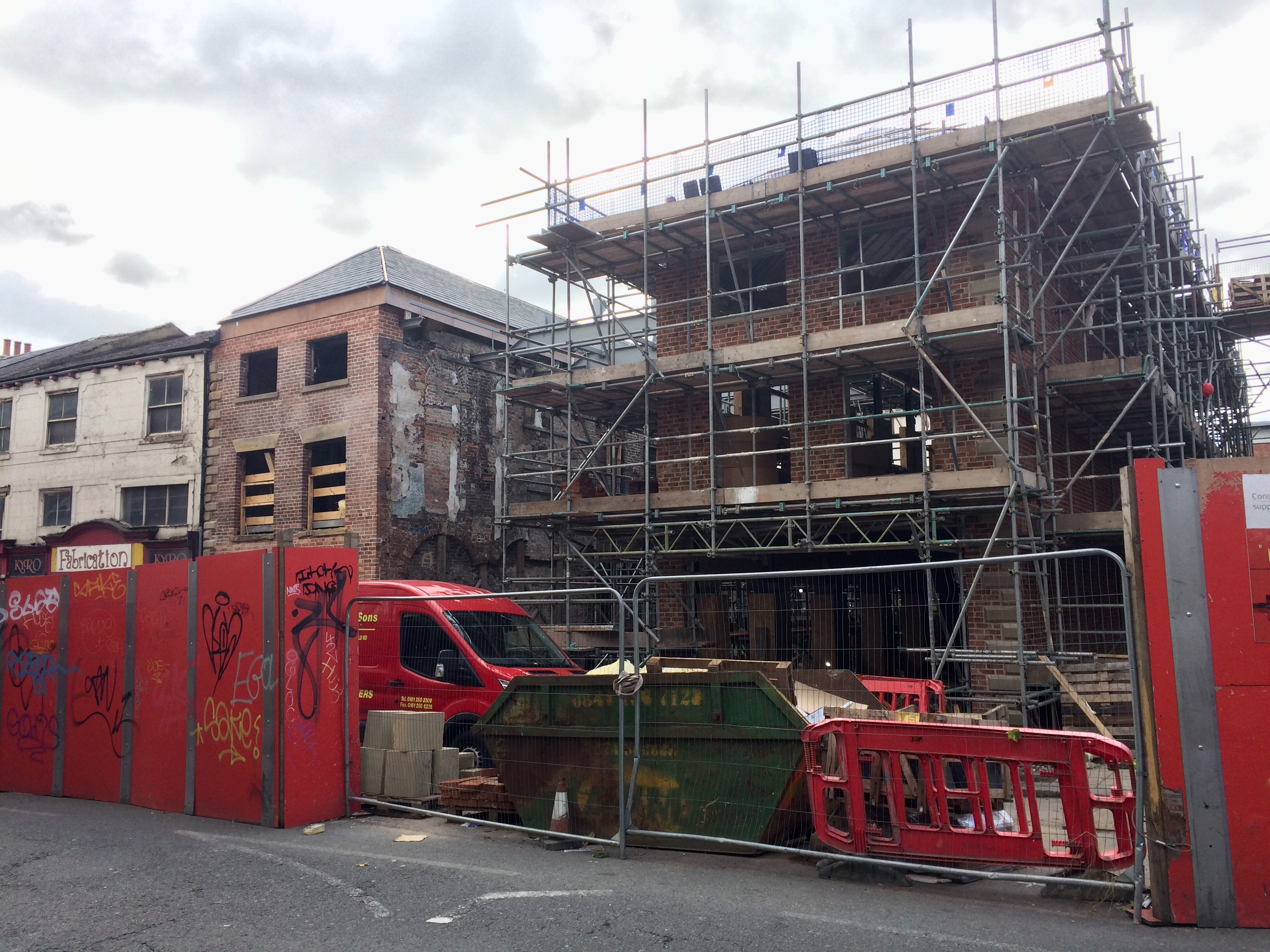
Reconstruction in progress, September 2020

At the end of the 20th century, the building was disused except for an amusement arcade in its eastern wing. Plans in the early 1990s to adapt it for specialty shops were not carried out, and it became derelict and a health and safety hazard. After consultations, the frontage and an adjacent building were demolished in 2010; the work was documented by an archaeologist and the materials were stored in case of a restoration. The building was on Historic England's Heritage at Risk Register for over 20 years.

In 2017, local developers Rushbond Group acquired the building, and on March 2018, Leeds City Council granted permission for a restoration, including replacement of the demolished west wing, as part of the Lower Kirkgate Townscape Heritage Initiative. Work started in March 2019 and was completed in late 2021.

In the course of the restoration, which was assisted by the National Lottery Heritage Fund and Leeds Civic Trust, Historic England commissioned dendrochronological analysis on ex situ samples from 19 oak and one conifer timbers from the former west range, which surprisingly indicated that the trees were felled not in the early 18th century but in summer 1476, and that the timber probably came from a single relatively local woodland source and was harvested at one time as part of a specific construction programme.

== Present use ==
As of 2026 the building houses three businesses operated by the same owners: a tattoo parlour and a hair and beauty salon on the first floor, and a restaurant, Moods, on the ground floor.

== See also ==
- 2nd White Cloth Hall
- 3rd White Cloth Hall
- 4th White Cloth Hall
