= 3rd White Cloth Hall =

Market hall in Leeds, England

Coordinates: 53°47′43.9″N 1°32′22.3″W

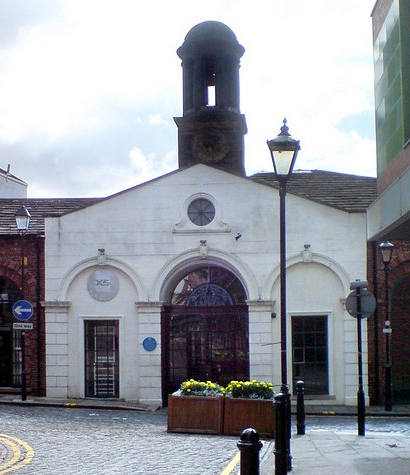
The 3rd White Cloth Hall from Cloth Hall Street

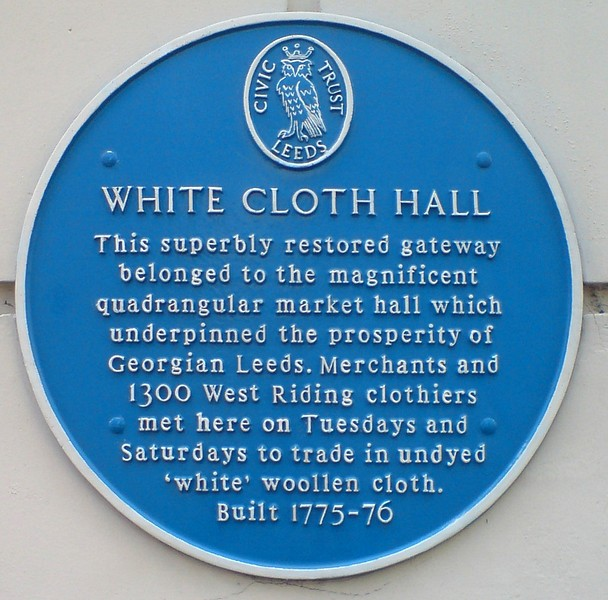
Blue plaque

The 3rd White Cloth Hall is an important historic building in Leeds city centre in England. Between its construction in 1775–6 and partial destruction in 1865, the hall was one of the most important market places in Northern England for the sale of undyed cloth.

== History ==
After construction of the two prior white cloth halls in 1711 and 1756, there was a meeting in 1774 to plan the building of yet another cloth hall in Leeds. Most of the money for the scheme came from the wealthy Leeds merchants, and a site was found on a piece of land called the Tenter Ground in the Calls. The hall was built around a large central courtyard. At the northern end of the courtyard, the hall was two storeys high, with assembly rooms on the upper storey. The Hall was built at a cost of £4,300, and opened in 1775. It held 1,210 merchant stalls. During the Victorian period, the White Cloth Hall Yard played host to various events, including the circus, as evidenced by an 1858 poster for Pablo Fanque's Grand Allied Circus.

The Cupola from the demolished 2nd White Cloth Hall was installed on the roof in 1786.

When the North Eastern Railway system was extended through the town centre in 1865, the building was literally sliced in half by the new North Eastern Viaduct. This necessitated the construction of the 4th White Cloth Hall, built at the expense of the North Eastern Railway company.

== Present ==
Only parts of the original cloth hall building remain. The facade is still present on Crown Street, just off Kirkgate and next to the Corn Exchange. The single storey wing directly behind the facade was restored in 1991–2 by John Lyall Architects and is now occupied by shops and a restaurant. Assembly Street separates the front of the hall from the original two-storey-tall northern wing. This northern wing was refurbished in 1990 by David Readman.

== See also ==
- 1st White Cloth Hall
- 2nd White Cloth Hall
- 4th White Cloth Hall
