= Choir of Leeds Parish Church =

The Choir of Leeds Minster is the choir of Leeds Minster, Leeds, England, which became a Minster in September 2012. The choir was founded by vicar, Richard Fawcett probably as early as 1815, and was certainly in existence by 1818 (from which year there is accounting evidence for choristers' laundry). The church's choir - boys and men - was, from its origins, a charge on the church rate; and, in what was then a largely non-conformist town, a none-too-popular one. By the 1830s, the choir's resourcing had been taken over by a list of voluntary subscribers. On arrival as Vicar of Leeds in 1837, Walter Farquhar Hook said he found "the surplices in rags and the books in tatters". Additional to its extensive commitment in the provision of choral services, the choir is known to a wide public through many recitals, recordings and broadcasts and by its regular choir tours - the first tour was held in July 1968 and the 40th anniversary tour, from 22 to 27 July 2008, included singing in Ely Cathedral, King's College, Cambridge, the National Musicians' Church St Sepulchre-without-Newgate in the City of London, All Saints Pastoral Centre London Colney and the Chapel of the Royal Hospital Chelsea.

== Daily choral services ==
Hook set to work to revitalise the parish and provide a church suitable for what he termed a "good" service; the choral provision was a part of this endeavour and, from the opening of the new church in 1841, choral worship has been maintained on weekdays as well as Sundays. Organists since 1842 include Samuel Sebastian Wesley (1842–1849), Dr (later Sir) Edward Bairstow (1906–1913) and two musicians trained at Gloucester Cathedral by Dr Herbert Sumsion - Dr (Alfred) Melville Cook (1937–1956) and Dr Donald Hunt OBE (1957–1975). The present organist and Master of the Music, Dr Simon Lindley, has served since 1975. Music written for the choir includes anthems by Samuel Sebastian Wesley - Cast me not away from Thy presence among them - and his visionary Service in E of 1848. Other repertoire from Edward Bairstow was composed specifically for the Leeds choir, including Let all mortal flesh keep silence (1906), If the Lord had not helped me (1910), Sing ye to the Lord (1911) and the large-scale Communion Service in D of 1913.

== Choral Foundation ==
Leeds has no choir school nor any large-scale endowments. An appeal for £500,000 was launched in 2002; by 2008, £406,000 had been raised, of which £22,000 has been sponsorship to cover specific expenditure and £28,000 has been paid in grants to the choral foundation. The administrative costs of the appeal from 2002 to 2008 are less than £2,000 leaving £352,000 invested towards the target of £500,000 endowment for the choir. The Church Urban Fund supported the work of Ashley Francis-Roy as the church's first choral outreach animateur during the academic year 2010/2011 and Helen Strange in this capacity for 2011/2012 with funding provided by the Hesco Bastion Foundation.

== Friends of the Music ==
The Friends of the Music of Leeds Minster (a support organisation founded in 1951) has saved the choir from oblivion. On its formation the Friends was the first such support group established at an English parochial foundation; there have since been many successors. The support of many parishioners and headteachers of the parochial school, St Peter's Church of England Primary School in Burmantofts, has also been vital to the choir's survival.

== Choristers ==
There are three categories of adults singing in the choir: choral scholars and lay clerks (many are students who sing in the daily choir and at weekend) and Sunday gentlemen, voluntary singers from all walks of life.

The boys' choir is made up of boys from schools in Leeds and further afield. A number of boys have become eminent in musical, educational, ecclesiastical and artistic fields and LPCC alumni including Paul Trepte (Director of Music at Ely Cathedral since 1990), Stephen Parham-Connolly of the King's Singers, Paul Dutton, a tenor singer and a music teacher who formerly at Leeds Grammar School, Gateways School, Harewood and, from September 2012, worked at Harrogate Grammar School, Andy Clarke, a lead guitarist of the Favorites in London in the 80s and Puce Wallpaper in Newcastle to the present day. Also the Very Reverend J Paul Kennington, Dean of Christ Church Cathedral (Montreal), Canada and Peter Simpson (formerly of Israeli Opera).

Girl choristers similarly attend schools in Leeds and further afield. The girl's choir founded in 1997 by Jonathan Lilley are directed by David Houlder. The girls attend most Saturday mornings during term time and sing a short choral service of morning worship at 11.45 am. Former choristers have achieved success in University Choral Scholarships, including Esther Chadwick and Sophie Wellings at Clare College, Cambridge.

== Weekly choir schedule and anthologies used ==
The parish church uses the New English Hymnal and its 2006 supplement "New English Praise" 2006; the Worcester Psalter edited by Sir Ivor Atkins provides the pointing of the psalms. Other collections include Anthems for Unison and Two-Part Singing, Volumes and 2 RSCM, Anthems for Men's Voices, the Favourite Anthem Book Volume 5, Sing Low Novello edited by Dr Barry Rose, Advent for Choirs edited by Malcolm Archer & Stephen Cleobury, Lent, Passiontide and Easter for Choirs edited by Lionel Dakers and John Scott, Hilariter [RSCM Ripon and Leeds] - a resource book for Eastertide edited by Simon Lindley, The University Carol Book - edited by Dr Erik Routley and Hymns for Choirs edited by Sir David Willcocks, and 100 Carols for Choirs edited by Sir David Willcocks and John Rutter.

- Monday 5.30 pm Choral Evensong (Boys)
- Wednesday 5.30 pm Choral Evensong (Full Choir)
- Thursday 5.30 pm Choral Evensong (Men's Voices)
- Friday 7.00 pm Choral Evensong (Full Choir)
- Saturday 11.45 am Morning Worship (Girls' Voices - sung by the Girls' Choir)

== Festivals ==
The Choir of Leeds Minster participates in two regional choral festivals. The Yorkshire Three Choirs was begun in Leeds in 1982 by David Young, Bishop of Ripon, and Canon Graham Foley, Vicar of Leeds. It comprises the choirs of Ripon Cathedral, Wakefield Cathedral and Leeds Minster and is part of the Leeds International Concert Season. The girls' choirs of Leeds Minster, York Minster and the Anglican cathedrals of Bradford, Ripon, Sheffield and Wakefield take part in the Yorkshire Cathedrals' Girls' Choirs' Festivals begun by Louise Marsh at Wakefield Cathedral in the 1990s.

== Choral collaborations ==
The choir combines regularly with Saint Peter's Singers of Leeds in special services and concerts at the church and elsewhere. The boys, choral scholars and lay clerks enjoy close associations with the choir of Leeds Cathedral and Ripon Cathedral. The Ripon/Leeds collaborations date back over thirty years to the Ripon organistship of Ronald Perrin; the cooperation with Leeds Cathedral is of more recent date.

== Royal School of Church Music ==
For more than three-quarters of a century, the choir has sustained links with the Royal School of Church Music whose founder Sir Sydney Nicholson was a friend of Leeds churchwarden Herbert Bacon Smith, the choir treasurer. The church organist Simon Lindley is an RSCM special commissioner. In Summer 2009, 2010 and 2011, Dr Lindley directed the Ripon and Leeds Area Diocesan Choirs' Festival on the occasion of the presentation of the dean's and bishops' choristers' awards within the diocese; the services in 2009, 2011 and 2012 were held at the Parish Church and that for 2010 at Ripon Cathedral.

== 200th anniversary celebrations for Samuel Sebastian Wesley ==
Special events held in celebration of the 200th anniversary of the birth of Samuel Sebastian Wesley on 14 August 1810 included a morning worship broadcast on BBC Radio Four on Sunday 15 August at 8.10 am. The Rector of Leeds, Canon Tony Bundock, officiated and the preacher was the lecturer, the Reverend Professor Simon Robinson. The boy choristers, choral scholars and lay clerks and members of St Peter's Singers with David Houlder at the organ provided the music. Later that same day, Simon Lindley gave a commemorative recital of the organ music of S S Wesley at the church. The SSW commemoration started at the beginning of July with a festal evensong on Sunday 4 July at 6.30 followed by a Gala Choral Recital of famous and greatly loved Anthems and organ music by Dr Wesley by Saint Peter's Singers of Leeds with organist David Houlder and conductor Dr Simon Lindley.
