= Meredith Davies =

British conductor (1922 - 2005)

Albert Meredith Davies CBE (30 July 1922 – 9 March 2005) was a British conductor, renowned for his advocacy of English music by composers such as Benjamin Britten, Frederick Delius and Ralph Vaughan Williams.

His co-conducting, with the composer, of the premiere of Britten's War Requiem, at the re-consecration of Coventry Cathedral on 30 May 1962, is generally regarded as one of the highlights of British 20th-century choral music.

== Biography ==
Meredith Davies was born in Birkenhead, Cheshire, the second son of a clergyman. At the age of seven he became a junior exhibitioner at the Royal College of Music in London, as a cellist. He went to the Stationers' Company's School, North London. He soon showed an interest in the organ, and was taken as a pupil by George Thalben-Ball.

At age 17 he served as organist at Hurstpierpoint College for a year, before being elected in 1940 as organ scholar of Keble College, Oxford. Studies for his Philosophy, Politics and Economics degree were interrupted by war service with the Royal Artillery, 1942–45. After demobilisation, in 1947 he took up the first of his two cathedral appointments, as organist and Master of the Choristers at St Albans.

He moved to Hereford Cathedral in 1949 as organist and choirmaster, in succession to Sir Percy Hull, staying there until 1956. This entailed being conductor of the Three Choirs Festival in 1952 and 1955. His performances at the festival included a memorable The Dream of Gerontius with an ailing Kathleen Ferrier. Having been encouraged by Sir Adrian Boult to become a full-time conductor, he went to the Accademia di Santa Cecilia in Rome in 1954 and 1956 to study conducting with Fernando Previtali. He returned to Oxford in 1956, to spend three years as organist and supernumerary fellow of New College, Oxford.

He then became conductor of the City of Birmingham Choir. In 1957 he was appointed assistant conductor to Andrzej Panufnik at the City of Birmingham Symphony Orchestra and was being groomed to be his successor. In 1960, when Panufnik resigned because of ill-health, Davies was offered the post, but declined, feeling he was not yet ready for the responsibility. Nevertheless, he became deputy musical director.

He cut his operatic teeth with Colin Davis's Chelsea Opera Group, and conducted Berlioz's La damnation de Faust in 1958, Mozart's Idomeneo in 1962 and Rossini's Il barbiere di Siviglia in 1963.

During the 1959–60 Birmingham season, Davies took over the conducting of Britten's Spring Symphony from the composer, who was unwell. Britten was so impressed that he invited him to conduct The Rape of Lucretia and The Turn of the Screw at the 1960 and 1961 Aldeburgh Festivals. Davies resigned from the deputy musical directorship in Birmingham in 1960, and made a very successful Covent Garden debut in November, conducting Peter Grimes. His handling of the big choral ensembles received particular praise. Early in 1961 he conducted more performances of Peter Grimes before going to Vancouver in July for the North American premiere of A Midsummer Night's Dream. He conducted the Covent Garden production of that opera at the Edinburgh Festival, taking over from Georg Solti, and in December conducted it in London. The following year Davies conducted Delius's A Village Romeo and Juliet for Sadler's Wells Opera (now English National Opera) and travelled to Buenos Aires for the South American premiere of A Midsummer Night's Dream.

In 1963 Davies became music director of Britten's English Opera Group (EOG) for two years. He conducted Britten's The Rape of Lucretia, A Midsummer Night's Dream, Albert Herring, The Turn of the Screw, Let's Make an Opera and Britten's version of The Beggar's Opera, either on tour, at Aldeburgh, or at Sadler's Wells Theatre when the EOG visited London. He had also conducted new works by Richard Rodney Bennett, Kenneth Leighton, Humphrey Searle and R. W. Wood while at Birmingham and at the Cheltenham Festivals.

=== Premiere of Britten's War Requiem, May 1962 ===
Davies had by now had a significant association with Benjamin Britten. Britten's original intention was to conduct the War Requiem himself. Davies was engaged to prepare the large chorus, drawn from all over the diocese. When Britten, following a minor operation, arrived in Coventry for final rehearsals, he found the acoustics unsatisfactory, cathedral staff unco-operative, and the chorus on the verge of walking out when an attempt was made to reduce their numbers because of lack of space. Meanwhile, the Soviet government refused, on political grounds, to allow the intended soprano soloist Galina Vishnevskaya to take part, and her part had to be learned at ten days' notice by Heather Harper. As the premiere neared, it became evident that Britten was uncomfortable about directing the performance himself. Alternative conductors such as Georg Solti and Carlo Maria Giulini were suggested, but Britten proposed that Meredith Davies would conduct the orchestra, chorus and Heather Harper, and Britten himself would conduct the chamber orchestra accompanying the two male soloists (Peter Pears, Dietrich Fischer-Dieskau) and the Melos Ensemble. The performance was a triumph and is still considered a landmark in British 20th-century music. Britten and Davies also shared the conducting at the first London performance in Westminster Abbey, but thereafter Davies often conducted the work by himself.

Late in 1963 Davies conducted Francis Poulenc's Dialogues des Carmélites at Covent Garden. In September 1964, he led the EOG on an historic tour of the Soviet Union, visiting Leningrad, Riga and Moscow. That year he was appointed musical director of the Vancouver Symphony Orchestra and stayed in that post until 1971, broadening its repertory considerably. He conducted several concerts by the Hallé during its 1976 visit to the Hong Kong Festival.

He was also chief conductor of the BBC Training Orchestra, musical director of the Royal Choral Society and conductor of the Leeds Philharmonic Society.

He was Principal of Trinity College of Music 1979–88, President of the Incorporated Society of Musicians 1985–86, and Chairman of the Delius Trust 1991–97.

== Other premieres ==
Davies conducted a number of other important, mainly British, premieres:

- Anthony Milner's cantata St Francis, with the City of Birmingham Chorus and Symphony Orchestra (1959)
- Leoš Janáček's 1914 cantata The Eternal Gospel, with his Birmingham forces (1960)
- Malcolm Williamson's English Eccentrics, a setting of the book by Edith Sitwell (1964 Aldeburgh Festival)
- Alan Bush's Variations, Nocturne and Finale on an English Sea Song, revised version (1965 Cheltenham Festival)
- Lennox Berkeley's one-act opera Castaway, with the EOG (1967)
- Jonathan Harvey's Benedictus (1970)
- Puccini's operetta La rondine, with June Bronhill in the title role, at Covent Garden (1974)
- Alexander Goehr's Arden Must Die, with the New Opera Company at Sadler's Wells (1974)
- Anthony Milner's Symphony No 2, with the Royal Liverpool Philharmonic Orchestra (late 1970s)
- the revival of Thea Musgrave's Mary, Queen of Scots for Scottish Opera (1980)
- Thea Musgrave's Chaucer settings, Triptych, with the London Symphony Orchestra at the Proms
- David Matthews' Oboe Concerto (1992), with Nicholas Daniel and London Schools Symphony Orchestra.

== Recordings ==
Meredith Davies made the premiere recordings of Ralph Vaughan Williams's Riders to the Sea and Sir John in Love.

Frederick Delius was another speciality: he made the premiere recording of the Requiem (in 1968, 52 years after the work was written and 46 years after it was first performed), and he also recorded A Village Romeo and Juliet, Fennimore and Gerda, the Idyll, and the Violin Concerto (with Yehudi Menuhin).

== Personal ==
In 1949 he married Betty Hazel Bates and they had three sons (one deceased) and a daughter. A further daughter, from a longstanding relationship with Cara Lancaster, also survives him. He died in New Alresford, England on 9 March 2005.

== Honours ==
In 1982 he was appointed Commander of the Order of the British Empire CBE.

Cultural offices
Preceded by Albert Tysoe	Organist and Master of the Choristers of St Albans Cathedral; 1947–1950	Succeeded by Claude Burton
Preceded by Percy Hull	Organist and Master of the Choristers of Hereford Cathedral; 1950–1956	Succeeded by Melville Cook
Preceded by Herbert Andrews	Organist and Master of the Choristers of New College, Oxford; 1956–1959	Succeeded by David Lumsden
