= Penny Pocket Park =

Public park in Leeds

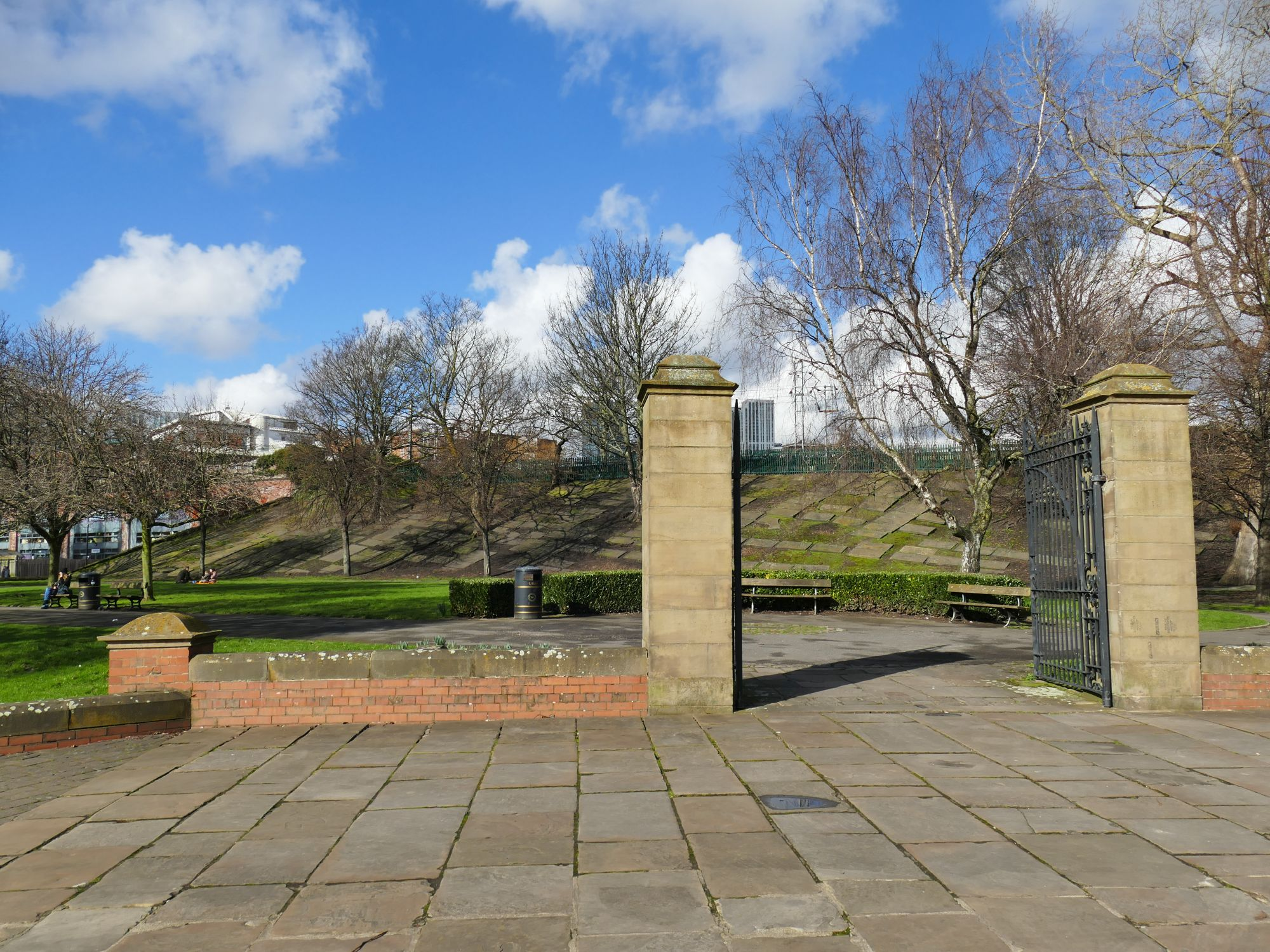
- Interactive map of Penny Pocket Park
- Location: Leeds, West Yorkshire
- OS grid: SE 30732 33369
- Coordinates: 53.79573°N 1.53494°W
- Operator: Leeds City Council

Penny Pocket Park is a pocket park in the Kirkgate area of Leeds, England.

Originally the land was part of the church yard and graveyard of Leeds Minster. As the population of Leeds grew, the grounds and graveyard were split from the church and divided up by roads and railway lines. Although it has been converted into a public park, the gravestones have been kept to adorn the slopes of the railway lines that bisect the land.

In 1912 part of Penny Pocket Park became the responsibility of Wade's Charity (formally Thomas Wade Trust), who retain ownership, though it is leased to and maintained by Leeds City Council.
