= St Mary the Virgin, Acocks Green =

St. Mary The Virgin, Acocks Green
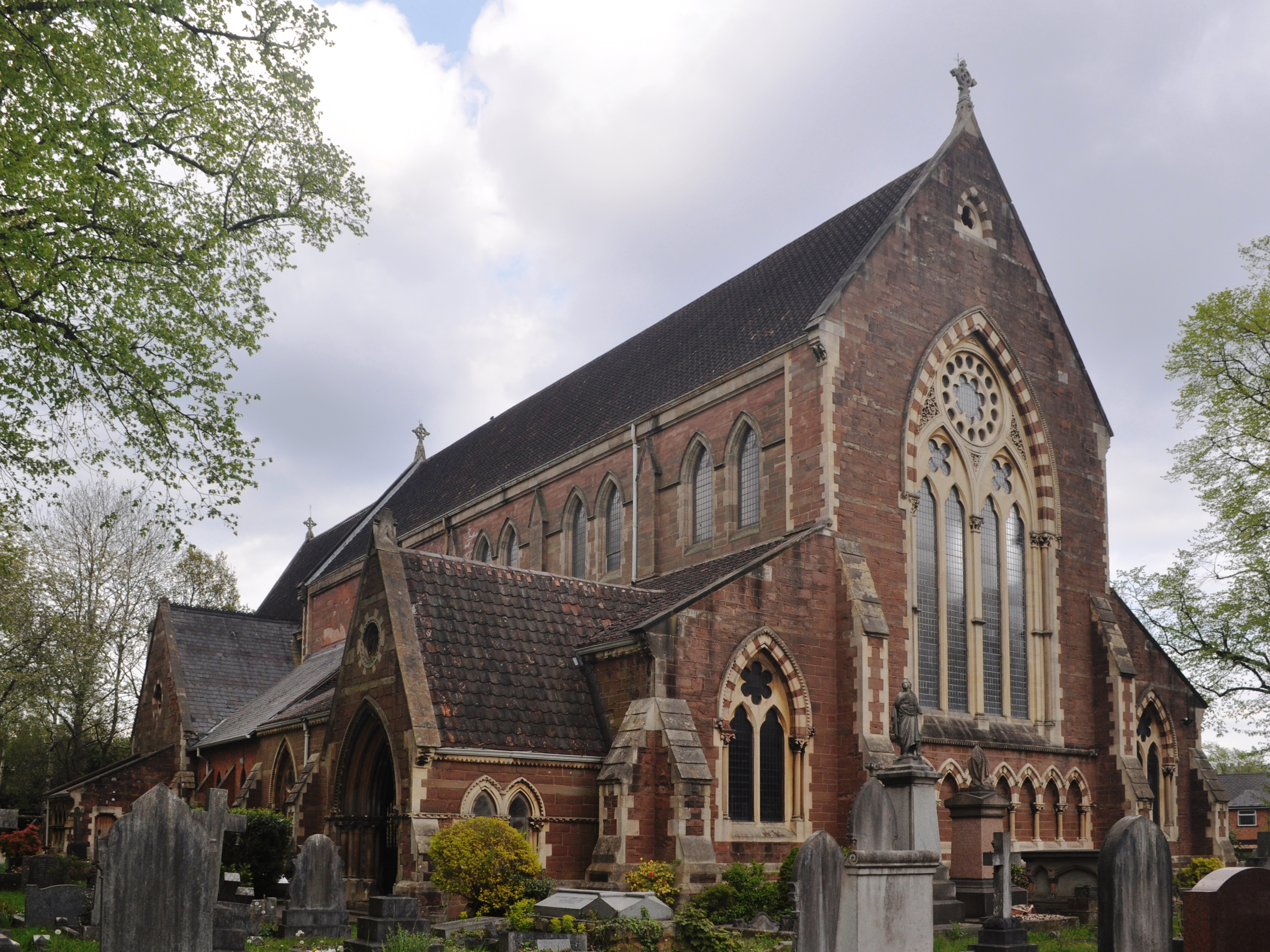
- St. Mary The Virgin, Acocks Green, in April 2025
- St. Mary The Virgin, Acocks Green
- 52.4477°N 1.8250°W
- Denomination: Church of England
- Churchmanship: High Church
- Website: http://www.stmarysacocksgreen.org/

History
- Dedication: St. Mary the Virgin

Administration
- Province: Canterbury
- Diocese: Birmingham
- Archdeaconry: Aston
- Deanery: Yardley and Solihull
- Parish: Acocks Green

Clergy
- Vicar: The Rev'd Philip Bowden

St Mary the Virgin, Acocks Green is a Grade II listed Church of England parish church in Acocks Green, Birmingham, England.

== History ==
For centuries, Acocks Green was part of the Parish of Yardley, however the population had expanded throughout the 19th century, with the middle classes moving out of the town, and demand came for a separate parish church. The church was the outcome of meetings of local people in 1864. The site was given by Yardley Charity Trustees, and John Field Swinburn gave an endowment of £1,000, equivalent to £51,500 today. The foundation stone was laid on 13 October 1864 and, on 17 October 1866, a portion of the nave and two aisles were consecrated. The church was a chapel-of-ease to St. Edburgha's, Yardley until 1867, when a parish was created.

The church, designed in 1864 by J. G. Bland, was originally intended to have a tower and spire at the southwest corner.

In 1894, a chancel, designed by J. A. Chatwin, was added. However, the church still lacked the north and south transepts, Lady chapel, choir vestry and tower of the original design, as it still does today.

Photographs of the church in its original state show that it had a much steeper roof pitch than today and roundel windows above the aisles.

== Plan of the church ==
St Mary's Church has a typical three-cell arrangement of aisled nave, chancel and sanctuary. It is conventionally orientated, with the altar towards the east. It is built in a Gothic Revival style, imitating that of the Early English period with buttresses in a 13th-century pattern. There is a vestry, and entrance to the church is by way of the porch on the north wall. The doors have wrought iron work resembling a 13th-century design.

=== Nave ===
Beneath the rose window on the west wall, there is a memorial to John Field Swinburn, the church benefactor.

The nave is separated from the aisles by five arches with contrasting red and yellow stonework supported by columns ending in Corinthian capitals decorated with acanthus leaves of 13th century design. Bomb damage inflicted in December 1940 still remains. In old photographs, contrasting geometric patterns can be seen on the brickwork between the arches, but these are now painted white. Separating the nave from the chancel is the arch again constructed from contrasting red and yellow stonework. The roof trusses are wooden.

The aisles contain windows based on 13th-century geometric designs. These developed from earlier narrow lancet windows.

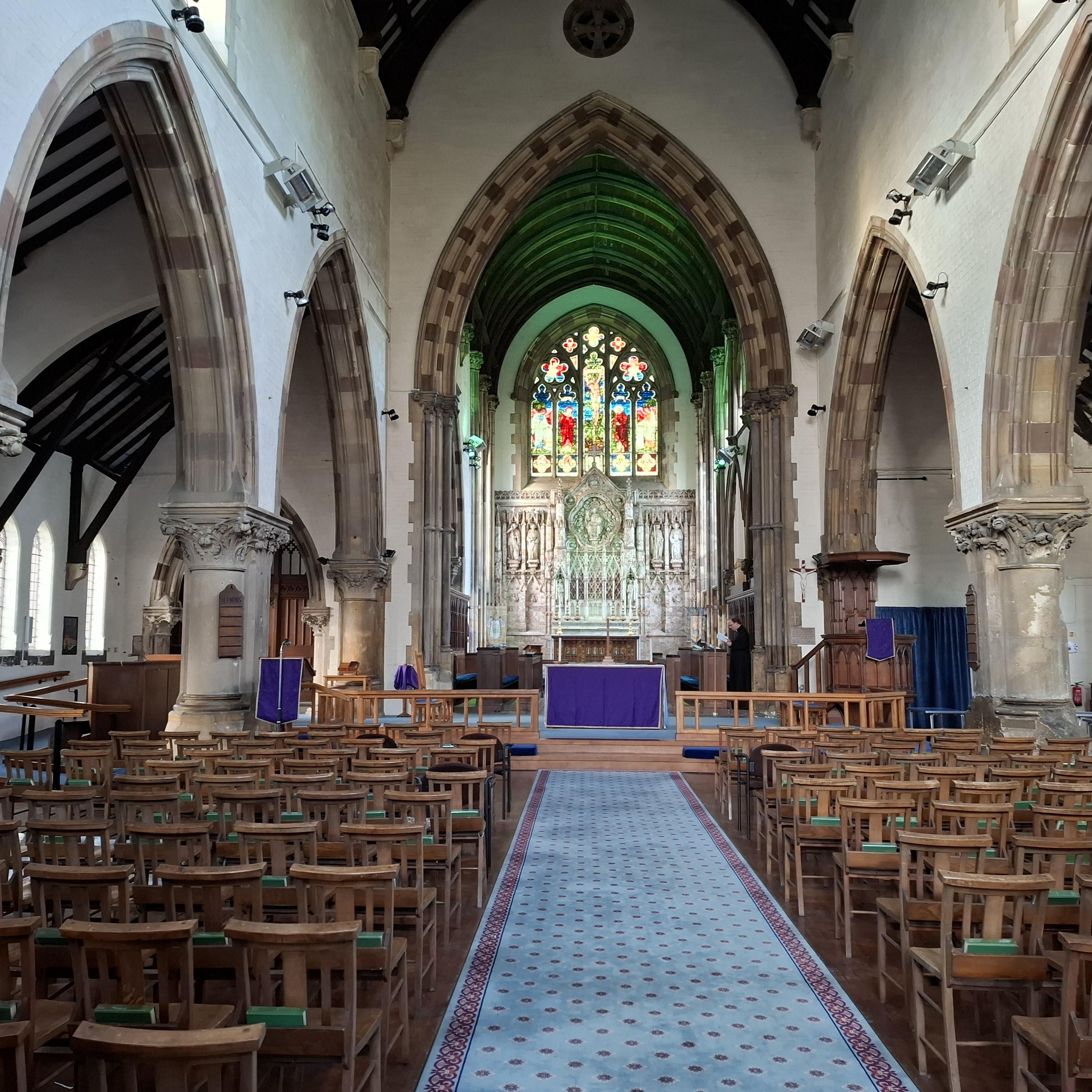
View of the nave.

The south aisle contains the war memorial to the pupils of Wellesbourne House School killed in the two world wars. Wellesbourne House School was situated to the rear and left of Holy Souls R.C. Church on Warwick Road.

The pulpit is on the right, but was originally on the opposite side. At 8.20 pm on 10 December 1940, a bomb landed in the nave, in front of the lectern, destroying the east window and all the other stained glass in the church. A confirmation class had recently gone to the cellar of the vicarage, then situated in what is now St Mary's Close. Revd. Philip Kelly collected the pieces and gave them to the art gallery for safekeeping. The incendiary bomb destroyed the roof and many internal features, although the structure was unaffected. The walls of the nave were raised to reduce the pitch of the roof, which had made repairs difficult and larger clerestory windows replaced the original roundels. The new glass was not stained but clear, so the church is now lighter inside.

=== Chancel ===
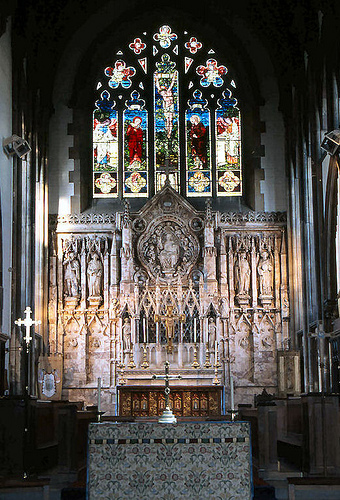
East Window by Edward Burne Jones and reredos.

The chancel has a wooden barrel vaulted ceiling, the trusses supported by corbels bearing stiff leaf decoration.

The altar is on steps of Devonshire marble installed in 1898. The reredos, the carved screen behind the altar, is of alabaster and was installed in 1903. The north wing of which was given by Revd. James Balleine and the south wing by Dr. and Mrs. Cordley Bradford. The stained glass in the east window is from a design by Sir Edward Burne-Jones. It was erected in memory of Revd. Frederick Swinburn, first vicar of St Mary's, in 1895 by his wife and son.

=== Services ===
The church holds weekly Holy Communion services on Thursdays and Sundays, both starting at 10am.

There's also Morning Prayers every Monday, Tuesday, Wednesday, and Friday, at 9am.

== Vicars ==
Name	Years active
Frederick Thomas Swinburn, D.D.	1867–1890
James Alexander Balleine, M.A.	1890–1907
Llewellyn Theodore Dodd, M.A.	1907–1913
Percy Edward Lord, M.A.	1913–1919
Reginald William Dawson Stephenson, M.A.	1919–1925
George Herbert Harris, M.A.	1925–1931
Philip James Kelly, M.A.	1931–1953
Charles Herbert Iball, B.A.	1953–1970
Bert Tabraham	1970–1979
Joe Evans	1980–1986
Rev. Canon Richard Postill	1986–2002
Rev. Andrew Bullock	2003–2022
Rev. Philip Bowden	2024–present

== Churchyard memorials ==
The churchyard is entered from the Warwick Road by way of a lychgate or Corpse gate. Historically, at the lychgate, the coffin was rested on a wooden or stone table while the priest said part of the burial service. It bears the carved legend: Enter into his altar with thanksgiving.

The graveyard contains some interesting memorials to the Victorian parish population, particularly those on the west side of the graveyard, which faces Warwick Road. A list of names of Monumental Inscriptions is published here by kind permission of the Birmingham and Midland Society for Genealogy and Heraldry.

One of the tombs here is that of Charles Rabone who lived at Stockfield House, a large house which occupied the site just above where Douglas Road joins Stockfield Road, now occupied by a Bingo Hall. The 1881 census records him as a farmer and maltster, farming 133 acres (0.54 km^{2}) and employing six men. Here also is the grave of Dr. Cordley Bradford, churchwarden for 25 years who died on 8 December 1931, aged 82, and that of Thomas Kiss, a grocer on the Warwick Road.

The large granite column surmounted by an urn with funereal draperies is to Emily Palmer, wife of Thomas Palmer, who died in 1885 aged 35. Thomas died three years later aged 42.

There are also four Commonwealth War Graves Commission graves; each marked by the distinctive, simple and dignified headstone, to casualties of World War II in the cemetery.

=== Sydney Basil Barber ===
In the north part of the cemetery is the grave of Sydney Basil Barber, Sergeant (Flt. Engr.) Royal Air Force Volunteer Reserve serving with 460 (R.A.A.F.) Sqdn. He was the 35-year-old son of Annie Barber; husband of Gladys May Barber, of Acock's Green, Birmingham, who died on 09/04/1944.

=== Gordon Grant Helm ===
On the south side, there is the grave of Staff Sgt. Gordon Grant Helm, Royal Army Pay Corps. He was the 26-year-old son of William Frederick and Ethel Victoria Helm, of Acocks Green, and husband of Betsy May Helm, of Elmdon Heath

=== Vernon Leslie Priest ===
On the north side, is the grave of Aircraftman 1st Class, Vernon Leslie Priest, Royal Air Force Volunteer Reserve. He was the 20-year-old son of Frederick and Elsie Gwendola Priest, of Acocks Green. His elder brother Alfred Lewis Priest, had also died on service the previous year.

=== Albert Thomas Rew ===
In the west side is the grave of Lance Corporal Albert Thomas Rew of D Coy. 4th Bn, Royal Sussex Regiment. He was the 24-year-old son of David and L. Rew, of 266, Wharfdale Rd., Tyseley, Birmingham. He died on 24 February 1919.

=== Wilfred Eric Wright ===
Also on the west side of the churchyard is the grave of Captain Wilfred Eric Wright, 5th Btn South Staffordshire Regt. who, though listed on the Commonwealth War Graves Commission site, lies beneath a private memorial with a stone cross bearing the Regimental badge of South Staffordshire Regiment.

He was born in 1894 and died of wounds on 3 November 1918. He was the sixth son of Frank Wright, a button maker, and Alice Wright. He originally arrived in France on 2 March 1915 as a lieutenant and was made captain on 1 June 1916. He was wounded at Vermelles on 13 October 1915 during the attacks made by the Territorial Battalions of the North and South Staffordshire Regt. as part of the Battle of Loos.

A medical report shows that he was wounded in three places:

1. A superficial wound to the left front of his head and ear
2. A flesh wound of the left forearm
3. A wound of the left leg the bullet passing through the calf.

These wounds were classed as 'Severe' but did not attract a gratuity.

He attended various medical boards whilst recuperating at home, and, although the head and arm wounds healed quickly, his leg did not, and was always weak. On 30 June 1917, a medical board declared him to be unfit for general service, as he could not march for long. He was, however, considered to be fit for duties behind the lines and was appointed as a Railway Transport Officer on 19 July 1917, before being returned to France.

During the early morning of 11 August 1918, he was on duty at Heilly Station near Amiens supervising the loading of mules onto a train when one escaped, and in attempting to avoid it he fell into a 6-foot-deep (1.8 m) disused gun-pit. He suffered a contusion of his right thigh with haemorrhage of lissures. He returned to England on the St Patrick travelling from Rouen to Southampton and returned home.

He subsequently died of pneumonia at Scarborough on 3 November 1918, widowing Mrs. Marjorie Claire Wright of Westleigh, Acocks Green. She was sent a gratuity and backdated pay of £333.5s.0d. and, on 20 February 1920 received the memorial scroll and plaque for those who died.

== Organ ==
The original organ by Nicholson in 1905 was damaged in the Second World War; its specifications can be found here on the National Pipe Organ Register.

It was replaced in 1950 by a Compton whose specification can be found here on the National Pipe Organ Register.

=== List of organists ===
Name	Years active	Notes
Thomas John Grainge	1892–1894	afterwards organist of All Saints' Church, Cheltenham
Arthur Elmore	1906–1932	formerly organist of St. Philip's Cathedral, Birmingham

== Sources ==
- 'Religious History: Churches built since 1800', A History of the County of Warwick: Volume 7: The City of Birmingham (1964), para 93. St, Mary the Virgin, Acock's Green pp. 379–396.
- Acocks Green, the archive photographs series, Compiled by Michael Byrne. Chalford Publishing 1997 ISBN 0-7524-1039-3
- Acocks Green, "Yesterdays Warwickshire Series No 8", John Marks ISBN 0-946245-63-0
- How to Study an Old Church, A. Needham, FRSA, AMC, Batsford 1944
- National Archive WO/374 Service Record of Capt. Wilfred Eric Wright
