= Grainge =

Grainge is a surname. Notable people with the surname include:

- Leslie Grainge (1910–1983), British professional rugby league footballer
- Lucian Grainge (born 1960), British music industry executive
- Nigel Grainge (1946–2017), British music industry executive
- Thomas John Grainge (1865-1944), British organist and composer
- William Grainge (1818–1895), British antiquarian, poet and local historian
