= Simon Lindley =

English organist, choirmaster and conductor (1948–2025)

- Lindley in the 1990s
- Born: 10 October 1948; London, England
- Died: 25 February 2025 (aged 76)
- Occupations: Organist; Choirmaster; Conductor; Composer; Academic teacher
- Organizations: Leeds Minster; Leeds Polytechnic; Royal College of Organists

Simon Lindley (10 October 1948 – 25 February 2025) was an English organist, choirmaster, conductor and composer. He was Organist and Master of the Music at Leeds Minster from 1975 until his retirement in 2016, and Leeds City Organist from 1976 to 2017. He also played organ recitals and recorded with orchestras including the BBC Philharmonic. He was Senior Lecturer in Music at Leeds Polytechnic and president of the Royal College of Organists, and served as master of music for several choirs and as editor of church music.

== Life and career ==
Lindley was born in London on 10 October 1948. His father Geoffrey Lindley was vicar at St Margaret's Church, Oxford, from 1956 until 1972, and his mother Jeanne, the daughter of Belgian poet and art historian Emile Cammaerts, was a writer and teacher and between 1943 and 1945 a log reader at Bletchley Park. After early education at Magdalen College School, Oxford, and graduation from the Royal College of Music in London, Lindley began an organ career in 1969, playing at various London churches and recording organ music.

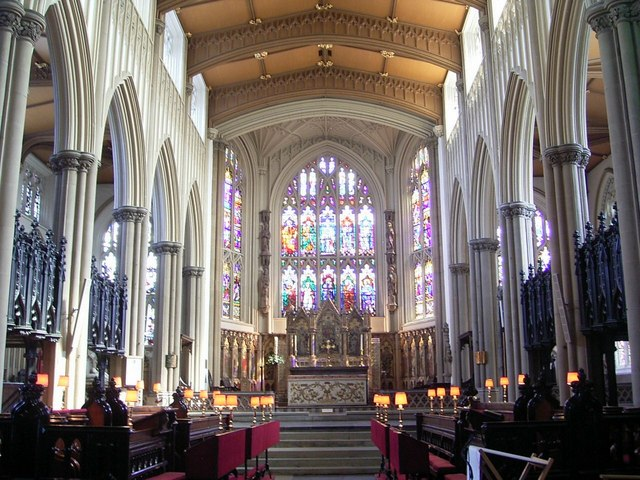
Interior of Leeds Minster

Lindley served as an organ tutor at the Royal School of Church Music and later as assistant master of music at St Albans Cathedral to Peter Hurford and director of music at St Albans School. In 1975 he became organist and master of the music at Leeds Minster (then called Leeds Parish Church), and directed the Choir of Leeds Parish Church until his retirement in 2016. He held daily Evensongs with the choir, some of them broadcast by the BBC and Yorkshire Television. He conducted a wide repertoire, commissioning new works from Francis Jackson and Philip Moore, among others, and performing neglected pieces such as William Lloyd Webber’s cantata The Saviour. As organist, he played Elgar's Organ Sonata at the Proms and tackled Julius Reubke's Sonata on the 94th Psalm. Many of his organ assistants went on to cathedral posts.

Lindley was city organist of Leeds from 1976 to 2017. From 1977 to 2020, he served as music director of Saint Peter's Singers of Leeds, a mixed adult chamber choir that he founded with his friend Harry Fearnley. The group performed major works such as Bach's Passions and Mass in B minor, and Handel's Messiah and other oratorios in the church. He also programmed works such as Jackson's A Time of Fire.

He was senior lecturer in music at Leeds Polytechnic (now Leeds Beckett University) from 1976 to 1987 and held the post of senior assistant music officer for Leeds City Council from 1987 to 2011. During the 1970s and 80s he was chorus master to Halifax Choral Society and Leeds Philharmonic Society. After 1991 he served as secretary of the Church Music Society. From 2009 and 2010 respectively, Lindley held posts as conductor of Sheffield Bach Society and Doncaster Choral Society until stepping down in 2023. From 1997 until 2022 he served as music director of Overgate Hospice Choir, Halifax.

Lindley died on 25 February 2025, at the age of 76.

== Awards and honorary posts ==
Lindley was president of the Royal College of Organists from 2000 to 2003, having first served on its council in 1977; he was then its vice-president until his death. He was president of the Incorporated Association of Organists from 2003 to 2005. He was Secretary of the Church Music Society from 2001 to 2024, working for the research and publication of critical editions of Renaissance and Restoration music. He served on the editorial panel for New English Praise (2006), a supplement to The New English Hymnal, and he worked extensively on compilation of the supplement. He was chairman of the Ecclesiastical Music Trust from 2004 and was Chairman of the Yorkshire College of Music and Drama from 2006 to 2013. He was in office as Grand Organist to the United Grand Lodge of England from 2010 to 2012 and from 2010 in the Masonic Province of Yorkshire West Riding as Provincial Grand Organist. Lindley received an honorary doctorate from Leeds Polytechnic in 2001, and a similar distinction from the University of Huddersfield in 2012. He was the recipient of the "Spirit of Leeds" award from Leeds Civic Trust presented in 2006 and a Leeds Award from Leeds City Council in 2016.

== Composition and recording ==
Lindley composed several anthems and organ works, edited choral music and arranged carols. He recorded as organ soloist with orchestras including the BBC Philharmonic and Northern Sinfonia (the Handel Organ Concertos), with Huddersfield Choral Society, and as accompanist to such musicians as violinists David Greed and Marat Bisengaliev and cornett virtuoso Phillip McCann. His disc of English organ music contains rarely-heard works by Basil Harwood, Percy Whitlock and Norman Cocker.
