= Sheffield Bach Choir =

Sheffield Bach Society was founded in 1950 to commemorate the 200th anniversary of the death of J S Bach in Leipzig, and to bring the music of Bach to Sheffield audiences. Its current conductor is Philip Collin, who has been the conductor since September 2023.

== Origins ==
The choir's origins date back to early 1950, when a series of lectures was given by members of staff of the University of Sheffield's department of music. Those staff members included Professor Stewart Deas, Emeritus Professor F H Shera and a lecturer, Roger F T Bullivant, together with invited speakers of note from outside the university.

The lectures were a great success and the Sheffield Bach Society was subsequently founded at a meeting called on 1 May 1950 by Professor Deas. The founding officers were the Bishop of Sheffield – chairman, Professor Deas – honorary director, and Mrs Eileen M Denman (a member of the university registrar's staff) – honorary secretary and treasurer. Mr Norman Barnes, music master at King Edward VII School in Sheffield, was tasked with forming and conducting a choir. Mr – later Dr – Roger Bullivant was appointed as the choir's first rehearsal accompanist until becoming Conductor of the Choir in 1962, a post which he held until 2000. Mrs Denman acted as chairman from 1979 until 1988, then as choir secretary and finally archivist until retiring in 1999.

The Sheffield Bach Society organised their first public programme in the Victoria Hall, Sheffield on 28 November 1950, with a concert by the Stuttgart Chamber Orchestra. The choir has performed a great number of works through the years, and their first programme was in February 1951. In 1964, Dr Bullivant formed the society's own orchestra of professional musicians, the Sheffield Bach Players. Concerts in the present day are accompanied by the National Festival Orchestra under the inspirational leadership of Sally Robinson with occasional use of organ accompaniment and a number of valued collaborations with Fine Arts Brass Ensemble.

The Sheffield Bach Society is an independent Registered Charity (No 511146), while retaining strong links to the University of Sheffield. The choir continues to make a significant contribution to the musical life of Sheffield and typically performs at venues such as Sheffield Cathedral, Sheffield City Hall, the Victoria Hall, the university's Mappin Hall and Firth Hall, St John's Church, Ranmoor, Ecclesall Parish Church, St Mark's Church, Broomhill and St James Church Norton. However, the choir also performs farther afield, participating in the Sixth Churchill Memorial Concert at Blenheim Palace in May 1971, performing in York Minster in June 1972 and at the Leeds Music Festival in 1981. In 1985, the society organised a six-week Bach Festival in Sheffield to commemorate the 300th anniversary of the births of both J.S. Bach and Handel, during which event the Stadtkantorei from Sheffield's twin city of Bochum in Germany, performed Bach's Mass in B minor. In May 1987, the visit was reciprocated when the Sheffield Bach Choir and Players performed in Bochum.

In 1991, the choir visited Leeds again for a special performance of Bach's Mass in B minor at Leeds Town Hall in celebration of the 150th anniversary of the consecration of Leeds Parish Church on 2 September 1841. The conductor at that occasion, Dr Simon Lindley, was appointed Conductor of Sheffield Bach Choir towards the end of 2008, and took up duties at the outset of the 2009 season. Dr Lindley was Music Director of Saint Peter's Singers of Leeds and was in 2010 appointed Conductor of Doncaster Choral Society, along with his other Yorkshire posts in Leeds and Halifax.

In addition to the concert programme, there have been private events such as members´ meetings, receptions, talks, visits to musical events elsewhere and Society dinners. Concerts by invited orchestras have also taken place, such as the performance by the London Harpsichord Ensemble in October 1954.

Despite the "Bach" of the choir's title, their repertoire has never been restricted, and through the years a wide variety of works has been undertaken. For example:

- 1959 – Handel's Israel in Egypt
- 1961 – Handel's Messiah (to become an annual feature)
- 1963 – Handel's Judas Maccabaeus
- 1968 and 2017 – Haydn's Creation
- 1970 – Mendelssohn's Elijah
- 1972 – Christopher Steel's Jerusalem
- 1986 – Geoffrey Burgon's Revelations
- 1986 – Christopher Steel's Sinfonia Sacra Symphony No 6
- 2012 - Handel's Solomon
- 2013 - Britten's St Nicholas
- 2014 - Rutter Requiem
- 2015 - Handel's Samson, Mozart's Requiem
- 2017 - Haydn Creation
- 2018 - Durufle Requiem
- 2018 - Jenkins The Armed Man
- 2019 - Brahms German Requiem
- 2021 - Rutter Requiem

Works by a large number of other composers have also been performed, composers such as Brahms, Mozart, Dvorak, Schubert, Monteverdi, Stravinsky, Bruckner, Vivaldi, Elgar, Britten, Vaughan Williams and Tippett. A particular feature of the society's work has been the performance of less familiar contemporary works, early examples being John Joubert's The Martyrdom of St Alban and Anthony Hedges' Epithalamion. Recent years have witnessed performances of major works by Mendelssohn besides, of course, Elijah; the rarely heard St Paul was given in Autumn of 2009 and the Hymn of Praise and Lauda Sion in November, 2011.

Both Roger Bullivant and Eileen Denman were awarded MBEs in recognition of their services to music, the former in 1984 and the latter in 1999. Following the death of Eileen Denman in December 2001 a Service of Thanksgiving for her life was held in February of the following year at Sheffield Cathedral. A similar service was held in February 2005 for Dr Bullivant, who had died in November 2004; addresses at this service were given by the University of Sheffield's Peter Hill and by Dr Simon Lindley who was to become the choir's conductor in 2009. Peter Collis had been appointed conductor on Dr Bullivant's retirement in 2000 and served for almost a decade in that capacity.

== Diamond Jubilee Celebrations ==
In 2010 the choir celebrated its Diamond Jubilee, with critically acclaimed performances of Mendelssohn's St Paul and Messiah in November and December 2010 respectively in Sheffield Cathedral. Returning to the society's roots in February 2010, Bach cantatas 30 (Freue dich) and 147 (Herz und Mund, with the famous "Jesu, joy of man's desiring") – together with the composer's concerto for oboe and violin were presented at St Mark's Church Broomhill and a special Diamond Jubilee event took place, also at St Mark's, on Saturday 26 June at 7.30 when Christopher Steel's Sinfonia Sacra was given alongside two works of Mozart the Solemn Vespers and Exultate jubilate.

== Previous Conductors ==
- Norman Barnes: 1950 to 1961
- Dr. Roger Bullivant: 1962 to 2000
- Peter Collis: 2000 to 2008
- Dr. Simon Lindley: 2009 to 2022
- Professor George Nicholson: 2022 to 2023

== Funding sources ==
With the high costs of mounting choral performances, over the years additional financial support proved necessary for the society. During the 1970s, South Yorkshire County Council recognised the contribution being made by the society to the cultural life of South Yorkshire, and provided funding for performances in numerous venues throughout the county. Arts Council Revenue funding was received through Yorkshire Arts Association, via the National Federation of Music Societies (Making Music), Sheffield City Council, and Arts Council England.

== See also ==
- Yorkshire Bach Choir
