= Commercial Street, Leeds =

Street in Leeds, England

Coordinates: 53°47′51″N 1°32′36″W

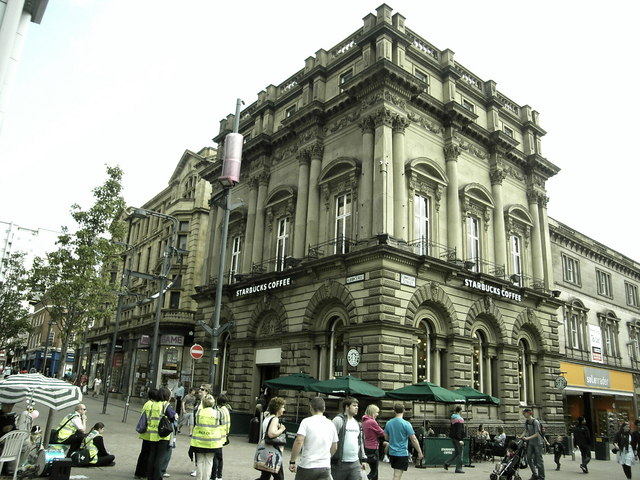
Commercial Street

Commercial Street is a pedestrianised shopping street in Leeds, West Yorkshire, England. It is 0.2 miles (0.32 km) long.

== History ==
The street was first developed by William Hey II around 1802-3. Leeds Library, the oldest surviving subscription library in the UK, is located on this street. The Greek Revival style building was constructed in 1808 and is Grade II* listed and was built by Thomas Johnson with major 1880-81 extension to the rear by Thomas Ambler.

The street runs west from Briggate to Albion Street, continuing to the east as Kirkgate, and to the west as Bond Street. It has junctions on its north side with Lands Lane, and on the south side with Bank Street and Marcelo Bielsa Way.
