= Melville Cook =

British musician

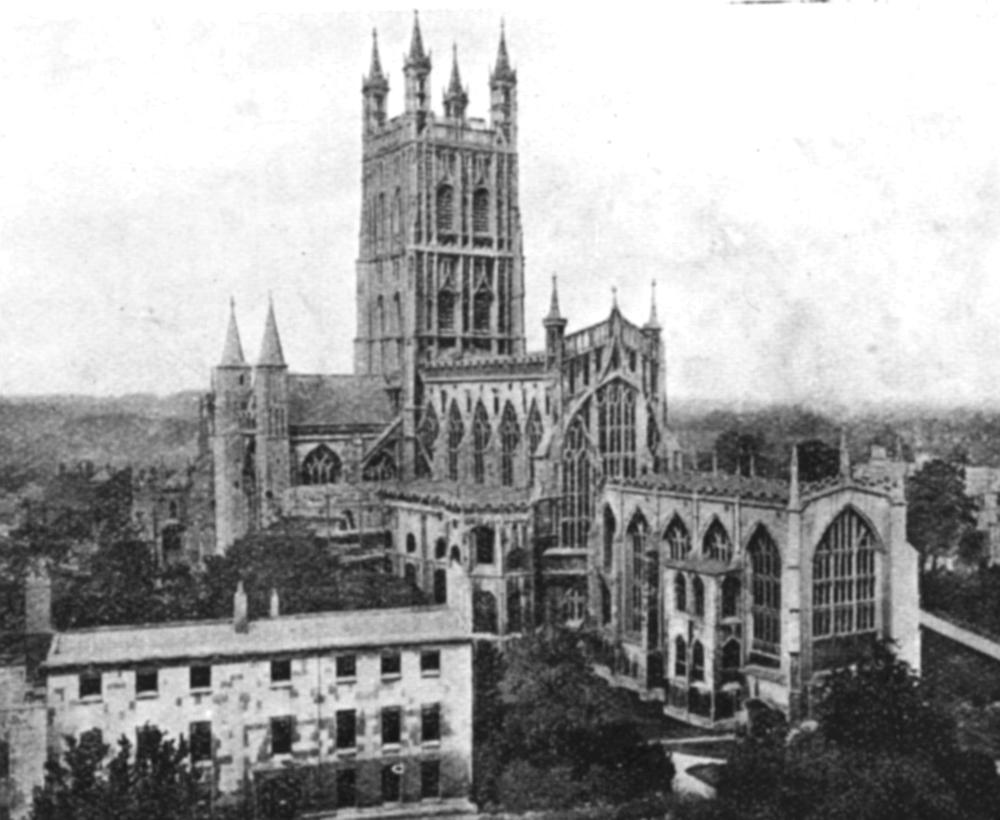
Gloucester Cathedral in 1920, a city where Melville Cook was born, sang as a chorister and was assistant organist.

Alfred Melville Cook (18 June 1912 – 22 May 1993) was a British organist, conductor, composer and teacher.

== Early life and education ==
Cook was born in Gloucester. He was a chorister at Gloucester Cathedral (1923–1928) and articled pupil there under Herbert Sumsion (1929–1932). He also studied with Herbert Brewer and Edward Bairstow. He held the ARCO (1931) and the FRCO with the Harding Prize (1931). He studied at Durham University, receiving the B.Mus. in 1934 and D.Mus. in 1940.

== Career ==
Cook was assistant organist of Gloucester Cathedral (1932–1937) and was also organist of All Saints' Church, Cheltenham (1935–1937). In 1937 or 1938, aged 25, he was appointed choirmaster and organist at Leeds Parish Church. (See also Choir of Leeds Parish Church). During the war he served with the Royal Artillery in the Orkney Islands, East Africa, India and the Far East, and it was during this period that he met his wife Marion in Scotland.

By 1946 he had returned to Leeds, during which time he performed on national radio both as a solo organist and choirmaster. He worked as director of the Parish Church Choir where he broadened the musical repertoire of Leeds Parish Church, introducing more unaccompanied music. He was also organist at the Leeds Triennial Festivals in the late 1940s and early to mid-1950s. He became conductor of the Halifax Choral Society in 1948, and founded the Leeds Guild of Singers in the same year. In December 1956 he took up the post of Organist and Master of the Choristers at Hereford Cathedral, where he was principal conductor at the Hereford Three Choirs Festival in 1958, 1961 and 1964.

In 1966 he emigrated to Canada to become director of the Winnipeg Philharmonic Choir and organist and choirmaster at All Saints' Anglican Church, Winnipeg. He was the organist and choirmaster (1967–1986) at the Metropolitan United Church, Toronto, where he organized organ recitals, chamber concerts, choral performances, and presented a number of oratorios with the Metropolitan Festival Choir and Orchestra. He taught organ (1974–1977) at McMaster University in Hamilton.

== Retirement and death ==
Melville Cook retired to Cheltenham in 1986 and remained there until his death in 1993. A memorial service for Dr Cook was held at Leeds Parish Church in the autumn of 1993.

== Compositions ==
- I Love All Beauteous Things (Stainer & Bell 1935)
- West Sussex Drinking Song (TTBB chorus a cappella, Curwen 1956)
- Antiphon of Darkness and Light (Novello 1973)
- The Character of a Happy Life (Leslie 1990)

== Arrangements ==
- The Secret Flower. Harmonized by Martin Shaw, Accompaniment and Descant by Melville Cook

== Recordings ==
- Leeds Parish Church (RCA VICS 1624)
- Hereford Cathedral (RCA LVLI 5019, RCA VPS 1065)
- Great Cathedral Organ Series. Record Number 11: Hereford Cathedral. Melville Cook, Organist. His Master's Voice: Q CLP3565 0 CSD3565. Recorded 1968. John Bull (Ed. Glyn): Pavana Sinfoniae. S. S. Wesley: Larghetto in F sharp minor. Joseph Jongen: Sonata Eroica, Op. 94. Jean Langlais: Incantation pour un jour saint. Flor Peeters: Aria, Op. 51. Maurice Duruflé: Prélude et Fugue sur le nom d'Alain, Op. 7.
- Selections from EMI Great Cathedral Organ Series, Volume Two. Hereford Cathedral. Melville Cook, Organist. PHI CD 161. Maurice Duruflé: Prélude et Fugue sur le nom d'Alain, Opus 7. S. S. Wesley: Larghetto in F sharp minor. Joseph Jongen: Sonata Eroica, Op. 94.
- Selections from EMI Great Cathedral Organ Series, Volume Four. Hereford Cathedral. Melville Cook, Organist. PHI CD 163. Melville Cook (Hereford Cathedral). Flor Peeters: Aria.
- Toronto: Metropolitan Silver Band and the Danforth Citadel Band (Cathedral Brass, 1973, Metropolitan Silver Band STM-0473)
- Stabat Mater by Joseph Haydn. Metropolitan Festival Choir and Orchestra, Janet Stubbs, mezzo-soprano, tenor Ronald Murdock (1988?, Stereodyne/Audio Ideas) (The performance was on October 28, 1978)

== Literature ==
- The Organists and Organs of Hereford Cathedral: Watkins Shaw and Roy Massey. Hereford: Hereford Cathedral Organ Committee, 2005. First published in 1976.

Cultural offices
Preceded by Meredith Davies	Master of the Choristers and Organist Hereford Cathedral; 1950–1956	Succeeded by Richard Hey Lloyd
