= Saint Peter's Singers of Leeds =

- Choir
- Origin: Leeds Minster
- Founded: 1977
- Genre: Chamber choir
- Members: 40
- Music director: Alexander Woodrow
- Website: http://www.stpeters-singers.org.uk/

Saint Peter's Singers (SPS) is a chamber choir associated with Leeds Minster, Leeds, West Yorkshire, England that celebrated during the Season 2017/2018 the fortieth anniversary of the choir's formation by Harry Fearnley in 1977. An anniversary concert took place at Leeds Minster on Sunday 25 June 2017 with the National Festival Orchestra and soloists Kristina James, Joanna Gamble, Paul Dutton and Quentin Brown. Further anniversary year events included Bach Cantatas and Music for Christmas at Fulneck Church in August and December respectively, Handel Coronation Anthems at Holy Trinity, Boar Lane as part of the Leeds Handel Festival in September and a tour of East Anglia in October. In November at Leeds Town Hall, the Singers participated in Herbert Howells's masterpiece Hymnus Paradisi with Leeds Philharmonic Chorus and Leeds College of Music Chorale under the direction of Dr David Hill with the Orchestra of Opera North. 2018 began with a concert of Sacred Choral Masterworks at Leeds Town Hall in February and Bach's Mass in B minor at Leeds Minster on Good Friday 2018 in memory of long-serving member Jan Holdstock. The final concert of the current season takes place at Leeds Minster on Sunday 24 June at Leeds Minster at 5.30. At this event will be presented the first performance of a new work from composer Philip Moore commissioned for the Singers' 40th anniversary – the motet Tu es Petrus – along with music by E W Naylor, Arvo Part, Sir Hubert Parry, Judith Bingham and Maurice Durufle.

== Background ==
Saint Peter's Singers (SPS) is a choir of approximately 40 mixed voices. It forms a key component of the choral foundation of Leeds Minster, Saint Peter-at-Leeds, achieving recognition as one of the North of England's finest chamber choirs. Saint Peter's Singers is a Registered Charity – No 507174 – and a member of Making Music, formerly the National Federation of Music Societies. SPS receives much appreciated annual support from the Friends of the Music of Leeds Minster, Leeds City Council, the rector and churchwardens of the parish of Leeds City, the Charles and Elsie Sykes Trust and other charitable bodies and private individuals.

Founded in summer 1977, by Harry Fearnley, then senior alto Lay Clerk in the Choir of Leeds Minster, SPS was directed from its formation by organist and conductor Dr Simon Lindley (1948–2025), FRCO, FRSCM, the Minster's Master of the Music from 1975 to 2016 and later Minster Organist Emeritus – whose colleagues at the Minster have contributed to the development of the singers as did Sybil Chambers (1938–1998), the choir's first principal soprano soloist who taught singing in the first 20 years of the choir's history. Additionally, Leeds mezzo Kathryn Woodruff (1954–2016) gave unstintingly of her talents as soloist in so many SPS Concerts as well as sustaining membership of very long standing – her service to music in and around Leeds, especially choral singing and music in education, was incalculable. Most recently, in May 2017, the Singers suffered the loss of Jan Holdstock, an alto of very long standing within the choir and for the past 18 months a full-time member of Leeds Minster Choir. Organists especially associated with St Peter's Singers include Dr Francis Jackson CBE Organist Emeritus of York Minster, Dr Donald Hunt OBE Director of Music at Leeds Parish Church 1957–1975 and Master of the Choristers and Organist of Worcester Cathedral 1975–1996, Carleton Etherington Organist of Tewkesbury Abbey, Jonathan Lilley Organist of Waltham Abbey Alan Horsey and David Houlder, Sub Organist at Leeds Minster since 2003.

The majority of SPS concert performances and recitals are given in the Leeds area, including appearances at the Leeds International Concert Season Monday lunchtime recital series held at Leeds Town Hall under the auspices of Leeds City Council, and other Yorkshire venues including Fulneck Moravian Church, Denton Hall near Ilkley, the Parish Church of All Saints in Cawthorne near Barnsley and the Friends' Meeting House at Ackworth near Pontefract. During spring and summer of 2011, the Singers presented recitals at Dewsbury Minster and Doncaster Minster – returning to Dewsbury again by popular demand in 2012 with other 'away' fixtures during 2012 to Leicester Cathedral and the Parish Church of Saint Cuthbert, Pateley Bridge.

St Peter's Singers is distinctive in that most of the principal vocal soloists are drawn from present or former members or members of the Minster's Choral Foundation – these have included Kristina James, Sarah Potter, Claire Strafford, Anita Wiencelewski, Helen Strange, Lucy Appleyard, Claire White-McKay, Joanna Gamble, Paul Dutton, Stephen Newlove, Christopher Trenholme, Toby Ward, Peter Condry, David Brown and Quentin Brown. A number of choir members, including some of the solo team, are present or former alumni of the University of Leeds and Leeds College of Music. David Houlder is principal organist and SPS accompanist/repetiteur for St Peter's Singers. The choir's chairman is Timothy Burleigh; its secretary Patricia Rose; concerts secretary and acting choir librarian is Quentin Brown; treasurer Jonathan Morrish; and the publicity and publishing director is David Hawkin.

The choir has undertaken visits to venues including St Paul's Cathedral, London, Worcester Cathedral, York Minster, Derby Cathedral and Ely Cathedral. In November 2007, by special request, SPS gave its first overseas concert tour in Romania, with recitals in Sibiu (the joint 2007 European Capital of Culture) and Bucharest. In autumn 2009, SPS visited Mallorca by invitation of former Leeds citizens now living there. Concert venues included the Basilica of San Francesc and the cathedral in Palma de Mallorca. The Singers returned to Mallorca in October 2013 for a second tour to under the direction of Alan Horsey with Organist David Houlder. Brittany was the venue for the choir's tour in May 2011 – with visits to Vannes, Quimper and Josselin. Evensong was sung at Guildford Cathedral en route for Portsmouth.

St Peter's Singers is committed to presentations at Leeds Minster and at the Venue, Leeds College of Music. Rare complete performances of Handel's Messiah, J S Bach's Christmas Oratorio and Advent Cantatas were performed in December 2008, 2009 & 2010. The Good Friday Concert in 2011 at the Minster comprised music by Dvořák – the Stabat Mater and Parry Blest pair of sirens and, in 2012, a special performance of Messiah in commemoration of the late Watkins Shaw, whose edition of Handel's masterpiece was published in 1958. Good Friday 2013 featured Sacred Music by Brahms culminating in Ein Deutsches Requiem. Bach's Mass in B minor – a work first sung by the Singers in 1985 as a tercentenary tribute to JSB – was sung on Good Friday 18 April 2014 at Leeds Minster. The 2015 Good Friday repertoire for 3 April was by Haydn – his Theresa Mass (Haydn) and Stabat Mater (Haydn). Again, the Singers were joined by the acclaimed National Festival Orchestra and organist David Houlder. For 2016, the Brahms German Requiem and Motets were repeated and on Friday 14 April 2017, almost to the day the 275th anniversary of its first performance in Dublin in 1741, Handel's Messiah was once again the work of choice. On Good Friday of 2018, 30 March, the Mass in B minor of Johann Sebastian Bach was our choice for another "Music for Good Friday" presentation at 7.00 pm. Bach's St John Passion is the work selected for Good Friday 19 April 2019.

== Repertoire ==
SPS has an extensive repertoire of sacred and secular choral music spanning five centuries from 16th-century English and Continental polyphony to works by contemporary composers. New works were composed by Michael Hurd in honour of the choir's tenth anniversary in 1987 – Genesis & A Secular Anthem – and a setting of the Stabat Mater was commissioned from Dr. Francis Jackson, organist emeritus of York Minster, for the singers' 20th anniversary in 1997. The choir has established a reputation for performances of the music of Bach and Handel in conjunction with Saint Peter's Chamber Orchestra. In recent years SPS has pioneered performances of the two monodramas with music by Francis Jackson – Daniel in Babylon and A Time of Fire. Both works have been recorded by Amphion. Recent performances by St Peter's Singers have involved Messiah (Handel) at Leeds College of Music in December 2008 with soloists led by treble William Dutton, now a pupil at the Yehudi Menuhin School and The Dream of Gerontius at Leeds Parish Church on Good Friday, 2009 when the choir welcomed former members as friends as guests and were accompanied by the National Festival Orchestra.

The singers are concerned with the annual Fulneck Baroque Weekend in August each season in the 18-century Moravian Church at Fulneck, Pudsey, and have performed major works by Bach and Handel each year since 2007. Summer 2012 at the Fulneck Baroque weekend involved the presentation of Church Music Classics by Haydn and Mozart including Haydn's Nelson Mass and motets by Mozart on August Bank Holiday Monday. Handel's Israel in Egypt was the work of choice for August Bank Holiday Monday 2013 and a presentation of Samson, arguably Handel's best-known oratorio after Messiah was presented in August 2014 to a substantial audience. More music by Handel was sung in 2015 – the Ode on the Birthday of Queen Anne and the Foundling Hospital Anthem. For the 2016 Fulneck Baroque event, we gave more Handel: Nisi Dominus, O praise the Lord with one consent, I will magnify Thee, O God, my King and the Anthem on the Peace. In November 2016, our seasonal concert concluded with Part One and the Hallelujah Chorus from Messiah and included in the first half of the evening Bach's Sleepers wake and the Gloria and Magnificat by Vivaldi. Fulneck Baroque on Bank Holiday Monday 28 August 2017, featured two Bach Cantatas 78 and 147 Jesu, Joy of Man's Desiring and the Foundling Hospital Anthem by Handel. Plans for the 2018 event include Bach Cantatas 68 and 106 and Mozart Sparrow Mass.

The choir visited Birmingham Town Hall in March 2010 to perform a programme of 'Sacred Choral Classics' as guests of city organist Thomas Trotter in his Monday Lunchtime Concert Series. Israel in Egypt by Handel with St Peter's Chamber Orchestra and soloists was presented at Leeds Town Hall in February 2011. On Bank Holiday 2011, the Singers presented Mass in B minor by J S Bach with soloists including Kristina James, Lucy Appleyard, Toby Ward and Quentin Brown. Instrumental soloists included violinist Mary Huby, flautist Michael Short and horn Robert Ashworth from Opera North. In 2012, the Town Hall Lunchtime Concert by the Singers on Monday 13 February featured music by Yorkshire born composers George Oldroyd and George Dyson alongside works by Sir Edward Bairstow. 2013 at the Town Hall saw a complete performance in English of Bach's St John Passion with audience participation in the greatly loved chorale hymns. On Monday 17 February 2014, the recital at the Town Hall by the Singers "We will remember them" featuring famous classics from the English Edwardian period up to and including the Second World War received acclaim in an extended Church Times review.

A notable centenary revival of Sir Arthur Somervell's "The Passion of Christ", composed and published in 1914, was the subject of a further Church Times review some weeks later.

Leeds Town Hall concerts in the season 2014/15 included unaccompanied polyphony on Monday 27 October 2014 featuring the Missa Bel Amfitrit Altera by Lassus, Motets by William Byrd and a movement from the Requiem for six voices by Tomas Luis de Victoria followed by Sacred Choral Classics, a programme sub-titled "Jesu, Joy" and all that Jazz" on Monday 16 February 2015 and the equivalent Concert in February 2016 featured Bach Cantatas Nos 118, 159, 68 – with My heart, ever faithful and 4. In October 2016, two major unaccompanied settings of the Mass were given by composers Frank Martin – his 1922 Mass for Double Choir and Ralph Vaughan Williams, whose Mass in G minor was the second work in a memorable choral recital. The Singers' fortieth anniversary year included another Town Hall visit, on Monday 13 February 2017, with a well-received programme featuring Favourite Choral Classics along with English and Belgian Organ Music played by David Houlder; the programme featured the Benedicite in G by Dr Francis Jackson CBE, Organist Emeritus of York Minster in his 100th year and other works by William Mathias, Antonio Lotti, Claudio Montervedi, Sir Charles Villiers Stanford, Wolfgang Amadeus Mozart, Felice Anerio, Serge Rachmaninov and Orlando Gibbons.

A special lunchtime concert at Leeds Town Hall at 1.05 pm on Monday 12 February February 2017 included glorious English music from exactly a century earlier in commemoration of the centenary year of the ending of the First World War and the subsequent Armistice. The 2018 event featured Sacred Choral Masterworks by English composers.

== Collaborations ==
SPS has engaged in collaborations with other chamber choirs and orchestras other than St Peter's Chamber Orchestra. The Singers regularly invite the National Festival Orchestra, led by Sally Robinson to join them for concerts and performances of The Dream of Gerontius, Dvořák's Stabat Mater and Blest Pair of Sirens, John Milton's Ode at a Solemn Musick by Parry as well as Bach's Mass in B minor.

Choral collaborations early on in the history of the choir included regular concerts with the Chamber Choir of Leeds College of Music under Timothy Gray and John Coates. More recent events have included concerts with the Chapter House Choir of York conducted by Stephen Williams in 2006 in honour of its 40th anniversary, and collaborations with the Elgar Chorale of Worcester under its conductor Donald Hunt. St Peter's Singers were invited to participate in the Elgar 150th Birthday Concert in June 2007 in Worcester Cathedral. The Singers and the Elgar Chorale collaborated in an Elgar Concert The Music Makers at Worcester Cathedral on the 75th anniversary of the composer's death in February 1934. A further visit to Worcester Cathedral on 8 May 2010 when Donald Hunt conducted Elgar's Dream of Gerontius and his own edition of Elgar's With Proud Thanksgiving as part of the Bromsgrove Festival in which St Peter's Singers participated with the Elgar Chorale and the Chamber Choir of Bromsgrove School.

In October 2008, the Singers presented a concert in York Minster in celebration of the 60th birthday of their conductor, Simon Lindley with music by Donald Hunt, Francis Jackson, Philip Moore and Lindley himself.

The Singers sustain close relationships other cultural groups including Leeds Philharmonic Society, Leeds Festival Chorus, Doncaster Choral Society, Sheffield Bach Choir. Recent collaborations with Sheffield Bach Choir included Handel's oratorio Solomon in Autumn 2012 as well two Baroque Festival concerts in the 2013–2014 season at Sheffield's Victoria Hall and the fine Victorian Church of Holy Trinity Wentworth South Yorkshire.

The members were privileged to have been invited in February 2014 by Leeds Philharmonic Society to provide the semi-chorus for the "Phil's" performance of Elgar's The Dream of Gerontius at Leeds Town Hall. Also participating was the Bournemouth Symphony Orchestra and Sheffield Philharmonic Chorus under the direction of Leeds Phil Music Director Dr David Hill. The organist was Darius Battiwalla and the vocal soloists Jennifer Johnston, Andrew Kennedy and Keith Brynmor John.

A major 2014 project – One Equal Music – involved magnificent sacred choral music for unaccompanied voices sung within the magnificent setting of Leeds’ Victoria Quarter. A Sunday evening Promenade Concert on 6 July was preceded by various "Flashmob" appearances the day previous and followed by recording sessions in July and September. The resulting CD was issued in December and has already been the subject of much acclaim. Composers represented included a number with Yorkshire connections – Sir Edward Bairstow, Dr Francis Jackson and Mr Philip Moore. Music in Latin, Slavonic and English covered a considerable spectrum of styles. The eponymous work was Sir William Harris's motet for double choir to a text by John Donne – Bring us, O Lord God.

In March 2016 the Singers collaborated with the City of Leeds Youth Orchestra and Leeds Philharmonic Chorus in a Sunday concert featuring the magnificent score for Henry V by Sir William Walton.

There were other collaborations with Sheffield Bach Choir recently, notably Israel in Egypt by Handel in November 2016 within the magnificently refurbished setting of Sheffield Cathedral. On 25 November 2017 the Singers joined Leeds Philharmonic Chorus and the Orchestra of Opera North under the direction of Leeds Phil Music Director Dr David Hill at Leeds Town Hall in Hymnus Paradisi, Herbert Howells's gloriously elegiac masterpiece, with star soloists Sarah Fox and Ben Hulett. Into the new Year, 2018, on Saturday 14 April 2018 the Singers sang for a second time in Sheffield in Bach's St Matthew Passion with Sheffield Bach Choir and the National Festival Orchestra at Sheffield Cathedral.
