= All Saints' Church, Cheltenham =

All Saints Church, Cheltenham
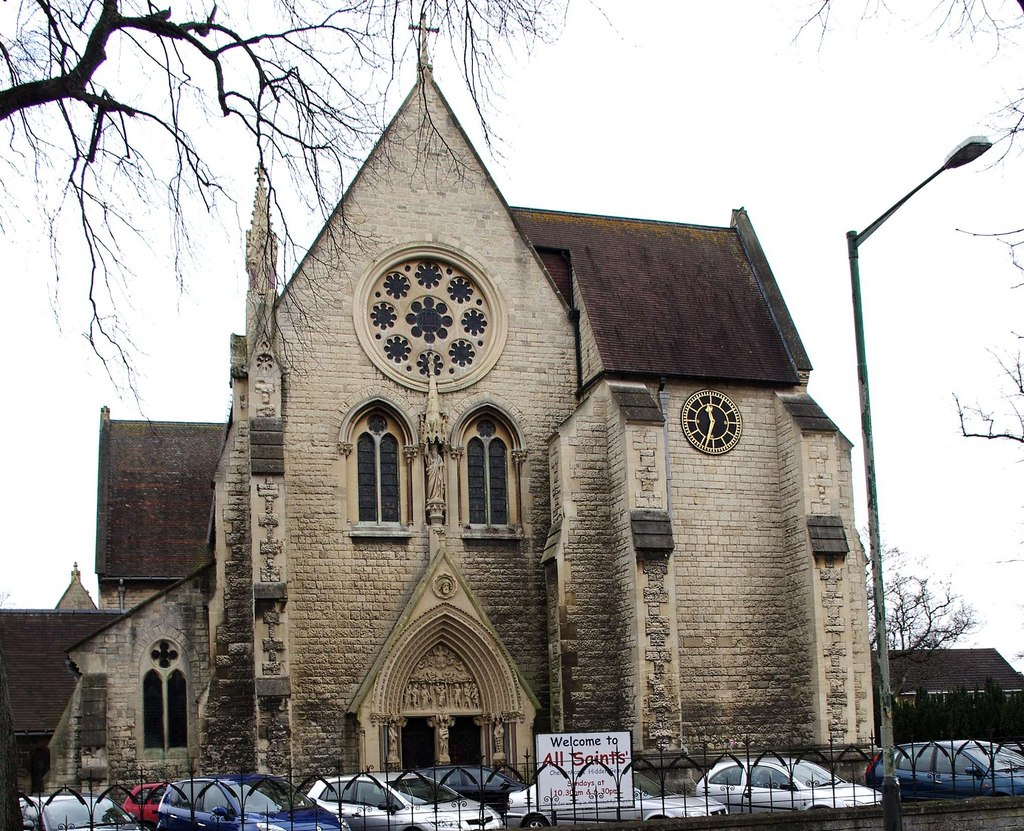
- All Saints Church Cheltenham
- All Saints Church, Cheltenham
- 51°54′8″N 2°3′50″W
- OS grid reference: SO 95703 22631
- Location: Cheltenham
- Country: England
- Denomination: Church of England
- Churchmanship: Anglo-Catholic
- Website: allsaintspittville.co.uk

History
- Dedication: All Saints

Architecture
- Heritage designation: Grade I listed
- Groundbreaking: 1865
- Completed: 1868

Administration
- Province: Canterbury
- Diocese: Gloucester
- Archdeaconry: Cheltenham
- Deanery: Cheltenham
- Parish: Pittville All Saints

Clergy
- Bishop: The Right Revd Paul Thomas (AEO)
- Rector: The Revd Canon Nick Bromfield
- Vicar: The Revd David Lawrence-March

All Saints Church, Cheltenham, is a Grade I listed parish church in the Church of England in Cheltenham.

All Saints stands in the Traditional Catholic tradition of the Church of England. As a parish that rejects the ordination of women as priests and bishops, it receives alternative episcopal oversight from the Bishop of Oswestry.

== History ==
The church was built between 1865 and 1868 by the architect John Middleton. It was refurbished by Temple Lushington Moore in 1907.

== Interior ==
The interior is described by Harry Stuart Goodhart-Rendel as "a splendid example of ... complete Gothic self-assurance with Victorian Punch". The stone font by Middleton has a canopy designed by H. A. Prothero (made 1896 by William Letheren). Letheren also made the wrought-iron chancel screen. The south transept rose window follows an Edward Burne-Jones design (made 1901 by Morris & Co.).

The church was the location of two music videos of Libera ("Still, Still, Still" and "How Shall I Sing that Majesty").

== Vicars ==
- George L. Gardiner : 1888 – 1911

== Organ ==
The Organ of All Saints’ was built in 1887 by the respected firm of William Hill & Son. The specification, consisting of 46 speaking stops, 50 ranks and seven couplers, was drawn up by the Vicar, George Gardiner, and the organist, Adolph von Holst in consultation with the builder Arthur Hill of Hill & Son.

By 1896 it had been noted that the Great Organ, speaking directly into the north aisle could not be heard by the choir in the chancel, and in the nave it drowned out their singing. The vicar therefore ordered the addition of a Chancel Great department, to be placed in a new case, designed by H. A. Prothero, above the console.

The Open and Stopped Diapason stops were sourced from the Hill transept organ in Worcester Cathedral, which had not long since been rebuilt by Robert Hope-Jones. A Trumpet (placed on the Harmonic Flute slide on the Great, but subsequently removed) and wooden Trombone also found their way from Worcester to Cheltenham. The Harmonic Flute was moved from the Nave Great to the Chancel Great.

Hill & Son returned in 1899, replacing the note and stop actions with up-to-date tubular-pneumatic machinery, increased the wind pressure to the 16ft Open Diapason on the Pedal Organ to 5 inches, added a 32ft extension as far as FFFF, and added a Euphonium stop, subsequently revoiced as a Tromba. The Swell Clarion was also added at this time, having been prepared for in 1887.

The hydraulic blowing engine, installed in 1887 with the organ itself, was replaced by a 5hp electric unit in 1912 by A J Price. The two stage blower (one main blower, providing low pressure, and a secondary, smaller blower to increase the pressure further) is a vast machine, still operating using the original motor, over a century later. A 4ft open wooden flute was added to the Swell Organ at this time, and the Solo box extended to also enclose the Choir Organ.

Price carried out further work in 1927, fitting tuning slides to the fluework, harmonic trebles to the Tuba and increasing its wind pressure to 10 inches.

In 1952-3 the Worcester firm of Nicholson & Co. rebuilt the organ, electrified the actions, fitted a four-manual console and made modest tonal changes, primarily to the choir organ. Further changes were made to the Choir and Solo organs in 1968, 1994, and 2007

A specification of the organ can be found on the National Pipe Organ Register. Adolph von Holst, the father of Gustav Holst, was the organist between 1864 and 1894.

=== Organists ===
- Adolph von Holst 1866 – 1894
- Thomas John Grainge 1894 – 1935
- Melville Cook 1935 – 1937 (then organist of Leeds Parish Church)
- Herbert Byard 1937 – 1945 (afterwards organist of Cirencester Parish Church)
- John Wright
- Cameron Luke
- Alex Fishburn 2019-2022
- James MacDowall-Scott 2022 - present
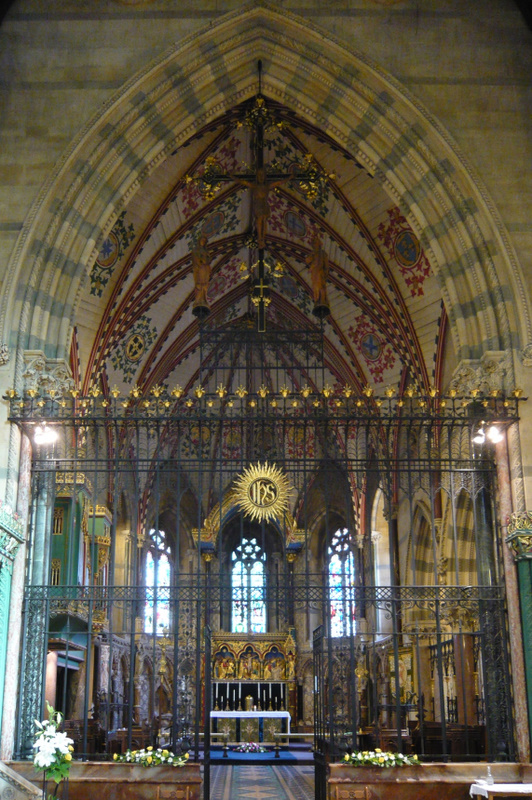
Altar and Chancel Screen

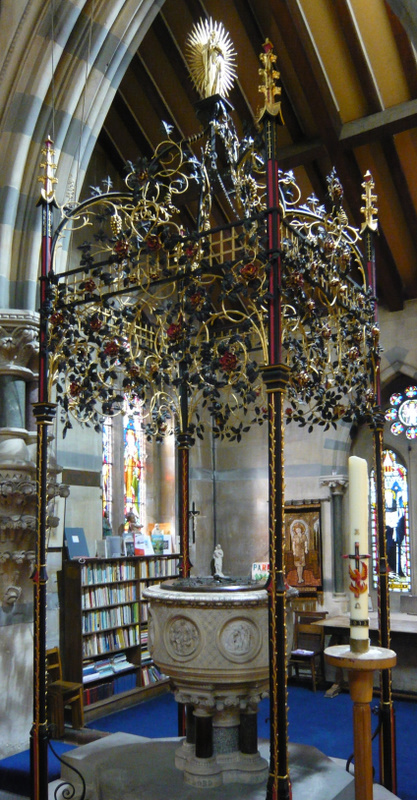
Font
