= Thomas John Grainge =

Thomas John Grainge (1865 – 4 January 1944) was an organist and composer based in England.

== Life ==
He was born in 1865, the son of James Grainge and Mary Couling of Abingdon. He was baptised in St. Ebbe's Church on 15 January 1865.

He studied music at Queen's College, Oxford.

He married Katharine Lillingston.

== Appointments ==
- Organist of St. Mary's Church, Woodstock 1884–1892
- Organist of St Mary the Virgin, Acocks Green, Birmingham 1892–1894
- Organist of All Saints' Church, Cheltenham 1894–1935

== Compositions ==
His compositions include music for choir and organ.
