= Leeds Minster =

Church in Leeds, West Yorkshire, England

- Minster and Parish Church of St Peter-at-Leeds
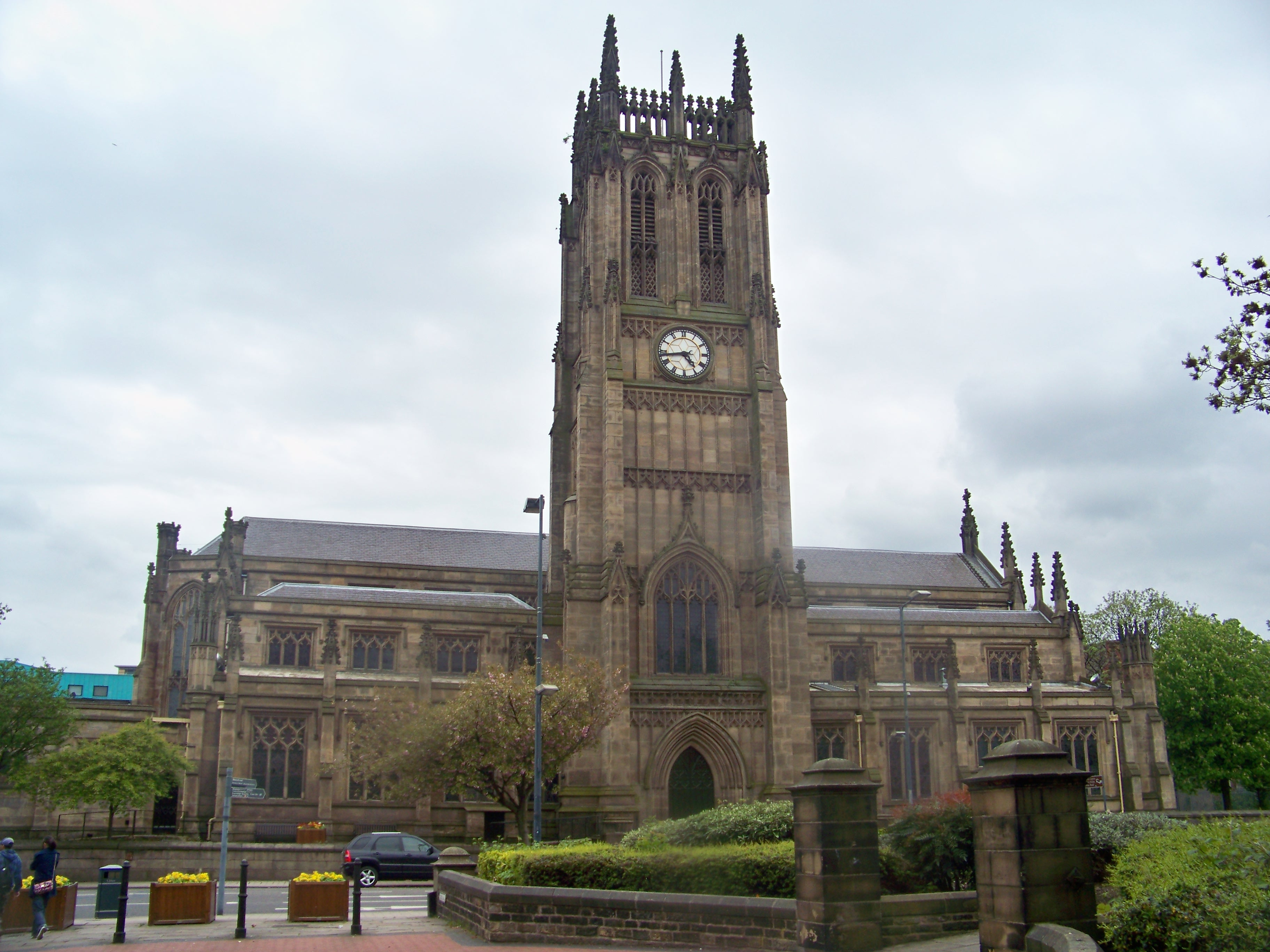
- The Minster and Parish Church of Saint Peter-at-Leeds
- Leeds Minster
- 53°47′42″N 1°32′10″W
- OS grid reference: SE 30658 33301
- Country: England
- Denomination: Church of England
- Churchmanship: Broad church
- Website: www.leedsminster.org

History
- Dedication: St Peter

Architecture
- Architect: Robert Chantrell

Specifications
- Length: 55 metres (180 feet)

Administration
- Province: York
- Diocese: Leeds
- Archdeaconry: Leeds
- Deanery: North-west Leeds
- Parish: Leeds City

Clergy
- Bishop: Nick Baines
- Rector: Paul Maybury

Leeds Minster, also known as the Minster and Parish Church of Saint Peter-at-Leeds (formerly Leeds Parish Church), is the minster church of Leeds, West Yorkshire, England. It stands on the site of the oldest church in the city and is of architectural and liturgical significance. A church is recorded on the site as early as the 7th century, although the present structure is a Gothic Revival one, designed by Robert Dennis Chantrell and completed in 1841. It is dedicated to Saint Peter and was the Parish Church of Leeds before receiving the honorific title of "Minster" in 2012. It has been designated a Grade I listed building by Historic England.

== History ==
=== The building ===
A church at Ledes is mentioned in the Domesday Book of 1086, although it is likely that there had been a church on the same site for much longer, as evidenced by the fragments of Anglo-Scandinavian stone crosses (known as the Leeds Cross) found on the site during the construction of the current church. The church was rebuilt twice, after a fire in the 14th century, and again in the 19th century. Walter Farquhar Hook, Vicar of Leeds from 1837 until preferment as Dean of Chichester in 1859 was responsible for the construction of the present building, and of the revitalisation of the Anglican church throughout Leeds as a whole. The architect was Robert Dennis Chantrell.

It was originally intended only to remodel the church in order to provide space for a larger congregation. In November 1837 a scheme was approved under which the tower would have been moved from the crossing to the north side, the chancel widened to the same breadth as the nave, and the north aisle roof raised. When work began, however, it was discovered that much of the structure was in a perilous condition, and it was decided to replace the church completely. The new building was the largest new church in England built since Sir Christopher Wren's St Paul's Cathedral erected after the Great Fire of London and consecrated in 1707. The new parish church was rebuilt by voluntary contributions from the townspeople at a cost of over £29,000 and consecrated on 2 September 1841. Florence Nightingale and Dr Edward Bouverie Pusey were among the congregation and Dr Samuel Sebastian Wesley played the organ.

The east end was altered between 1870 and 1880.

The parish church became Leeds Minster in a ceremony on Sunday 2 September 2012, on the 171st anniversary of the consecration of the building. Leeds is one of three minster churches in the county of West Yorkshire, the other two being Dewsbury Minster and Halifax Minster; there are two cathedrals in the county, Bradford Cathedral and Wakefield Cathedral, and Ripon Cathedral, in North Yorkshire, is in the Anglican Diocese of Leeds.

=== The parish ===
The rambling parish of Leeds covered an area of 21,000 acres. It included in it the out-townships of Allerton, Armley, Beeston, Bramley, Farnley, Gipton, Headingley, Holbeck, Hunslet and Wortley; Adel and Whitkirk were separate parishes. On founding the Benedictine Priory of the Holy Trinity, York in 1089 Ralph Paynel granted it the right to appoint the priest and collect the tithes from the parish of Leeds. Over years, many out-townships established local chapels of ease to save parishioners the trek to the parish church: Bramley's, founded by monks at Kirkstall Abbey, may have been first, followed by Farnley's from about 1240, Beeston's from 1597, Headingley's from 1616, and Armley and Wortley's from 1649. In the town itself, the parish church was supplemented by St John's Church on New Briggate in 1634 and Holy Trinity Church on Boar Lane in 1727 (both of which remained in the Parish of Leeds). The nineteenth century saw a large number of new Commissioners' Churches built throughout the parish.

Following the English Reformation, the right to appoint the parish's priest passed between different owners until 1588, when a group of parishioners bought it, putting it in the hands of Leeds's people.

A proposal in 1650 to divide the parish came to nothing, but in 1826 St Mark's Church in Woodhouse gained its own parish district and in 1829 St Stephen's Church in Kirkstall followed suit. However, in the 1840s two acts of Parliament provided for the creation of a wave of parishes: the Spiritual Care of Populous Parishes Act 1843 (6 & 7 Vict. c. 37) and Walter Hook's Leeds Vicarage Act 1844 (7 & 8 Vict. c. cviii). Under the former act were created the parishes of St Andrew's (1845); St Philip's (1847); Holy Trinity, Meanwood (1849); All Saints (1850); St John's, Little Holbeck (1850); St Matthew's, Little London (1851); St Jude's, Hunslet (1853); St John's, Wortley; St Michael's, Buslingthorpe; St Matthias's, Burley; St Barnabas, Little Holbeck (1854). Under the latter act were created the parishes of St John's Church, Briggate (1845); St Saviour's (1846); St Mary's, Hunslet (1847); and St Michael's, Farnley (1851).

== Architecture ==
Cruciform in plan, the minster is built in ashlar stone with slate roofs, in an imitation of the English Gothic style of the late 14th century, a period of transition from the Decorated to the Perpendicular. The church is 180 feet (55 m) long and 86 feet (26 m) wide, its tower rising to 139 feet (42 m). The chancel and nave each have four bays of equal length with clerestories and tall aisles. The tower is situated at the centre of north aisle. Below the tower on the north side is the main entrance. The tower has four unequal stages with panelled sides and corner buttresses terminating in crocketed turrets with openwork battlements and crocketted pinnacles. The clock was made by Potts of Leeds.

== Furnishings, fittings, glass and treasures ==
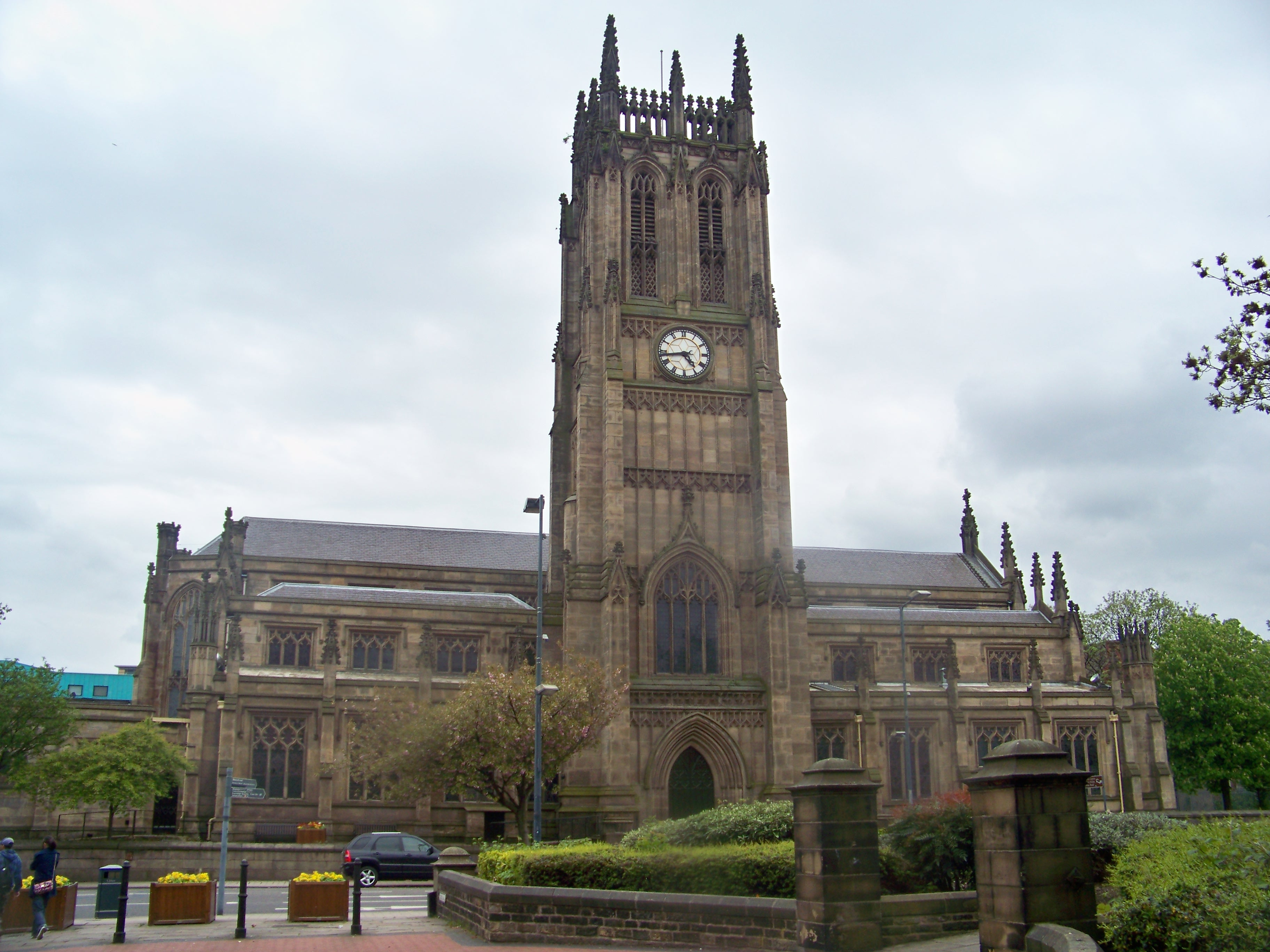
The north face of the church

The windows exhibit Perpendicular tracery and there is a five-light east window from 1846 containing glass collected on the continent. At the east end the sanctuary has a marble arcade with mosaics by Salviati of Venice, and the reredos is made of coloured marble and alabaster by George Edmund Street.

A peal of 13 bells was cast by Mears in 1842. These bells were then recast into the current peal by John Taylor of Loughborough in 1932. The tenor bell weighs 40 long cwt 1 qr 27 lb (4,535 lb or 2,057 kg).

The organ, parts of which date from 1841 and earlier, is essentially a Harrison and Harrison of 1914 vintage, but incorporating significant amounts of pipework by Edmund Schulze. It was restored in 1927 and 1949 by Harrison and Harrison; in 1965 by Wood, Wordsworth and in 1997 by Andrew Carter. The restoration of the blowing plant and refurbishment of the blower house were undertaken in 1997 by Allfab Engineering of Methley.

Among many artefacts and memorials in the Minster are the Anglo-Saxon Leeds Cross (an Anglian cross to the south of the marble pavement known as the altar flat) the pieces of which were discovered in 1838 when the medieval church was demolished. There is also a brass commemorating Captain Oates of Scott's Antarctic expedition, who had Leeds connections. Flemish stained glass enhances the apse of Chantrell's interior – he designed the windows to fit the glass – and of more recent date (1997) is Sally Scott's Angel Screen at the north tower porch entrance, an example of contemporary glass engraving and a gift from the family of Lord Marshall of Leeds. The Christopher Beckett memorial and most of the architectural sculpture is by Robert Mawer.

Outside in the churchyard, facing out onto Kirkgate, is the Leeds Rifles War Memorial, which was designed by Sir Edwin Lutyens and unveiled on 13 November 1921. It is separately a grade II listed building.

== Minster ==
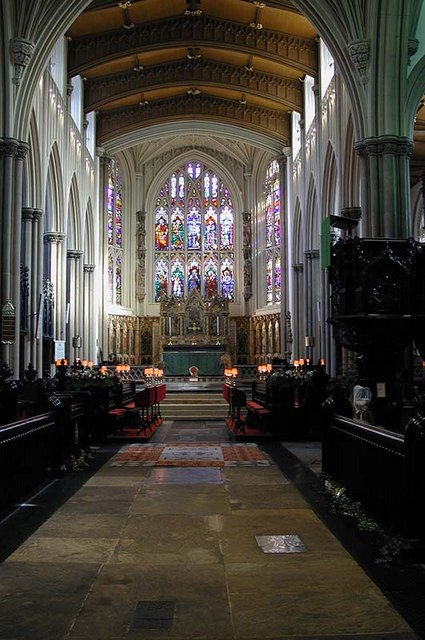
Interior of the Minster

The Minster and Parish Church of Saint Peter-at-Leeds is in the Diocese of Leeds (which has its cathedrals at Ripon, Wakefield and Bradford), in the Parish of Leeds City along with the Georgian Church of Holy Trinity, Boar Lane and the congregation of St Mary's Lincoln Green worshipping weekly in the Hall of St Peter's Church of England Primary School, Cromwell Street, Burmantofts. The minster is at the easternmost extremity of the city centre, within a precinct bordering two of the city's oldest thoroughfares – Kirkgate (now part of the Inner City Loop Road) to the north, and The Calls to the south. Another ancient pathway, High Court Ings, connects the western precinct with High Court.

The Reverend Canon Paul Maybury is the Incumbent, licensed in December 2022.

Work with young people undertaken by the parish includes The Market Place drop-in centre.

During choir terms there are at least three choral services each week sung by an adult chamber choir of skilled volunteers and choral scholars drawn from Leeds and York Universities as well as Leeds Conservatoire. There is a weekly organ recital from September to July inclusive on Fridays at 1 pm, featuring the resident organists and guest recitalists.

Leeds Minster is a member of the Greater Churches Group. Sir John Betjeman in a BBC Broadcast remarked that: "There's High Church, Low Church and Leeds Parish Church".

The church is illuminated at night by floodlights donated by Tetley's brewery.

The building is open to visitors, Tuesday to Saturday 11 am to 2 pm and during worship on Sunday.

The Minster archives are held at the Leeds office of West Yorkshire Archive Service. The church has memorials to families who were prominent in the parish, including the Kitchingman, Fenton, Lodge, Milner, Cookson, and Ibbetsons.

== Present ==
On 2 September 2012 Leeds Parish Church became a minster; it may be designated the pro-cathedral of the new Diocese of Leeds if the diocesan bishop so decides.

== Vicars of Leeds from 1220 and Rectors of Leeds from 1991 ==
This list is incomplete

Vicars

- Hugo 1220
- Alanus de Shirburn 1242
- Johannes de Feversham 1250
- Galfridus de Sponden 1281
- Gilbertus Gaudibus 1316
- Alanus de Berewick 1320
- William Brunby
- William Mirfield 1392
- Johannes Snagtall 1391
- Robert Presselew 1408
- Robert Newton
- William Saxton 1418
- Johannes Herbert 1424
- Jacobus Baguley
- Thomas Clarell, 1430
- William Evre B.D. 1470
- Johannes Frazer (Bishop of Ross) 1482
- Matrinus Collins 1499
- Robert Wranwash B.A. 1500
- William Evre 1508
- Johannes Thompson
- Johannes Thornton
- Christopher Bradley 1556
- Alexander Fawvett 1559
- Robert Cooke B.D. 1590
- Alexander Cooke B.D. 1615
- Henry Robinson B.C. 1632
- Peter Saxton M.A. 1646
- William Styles M.A. 1652
- Johannes Lake D.D. 1661
- Marmaduke Cooke D.D. 1663
- Johannes Milner B.D. 1677
- Johan. Killingbeck B. D. 1690
- Josephus Cookson M.A. 1715
- Samuel Kirshaw D.D. 1746
- Peter Haddon M.A. 1786
- Richard Fawcett M.A. 1815 – founder of The Choir of Leeds Parish Church
- Walter Farquhar Hook D.D. 1837 (formerly vicar of Holy Trinity Church, Coventry, later Dean of Chichester Cathedral)
- James Atlay D. D. 1859 (later Bishop of Hereford)
- Canon James Russell Woodford D.D. 1868–1873 (later Bishop of Ely)
- John Gott 1873–1885 (later Chaplain to the Bishop of Ripon; Dean of Worcester Cathedral from 1885; afterwards Bishop of Truro)
- Francis John Jayne 1886–1888; afterwards Bishop of Chester
- Edward Stuart Talbot 1888–1895 (later Bishop of Rochester then Bishop of Southwark and, finally Bishop of Winchester
- Edgar Charles Sumner Gibson 1895–1905 (later Bishop of Gloucester)
- Samuel Bickersteth 1905–1916 then Canon and later Librarian of Canterbury Cathedral
- Bernard Oliver Francis Heywood 1916–1926 (subsequently Bishop of Southwell, later Bishop of Hull and finally Bishop of Ely)
- Canon William Thompson Elliott 1926–1938 (later Canon of Westminster)
- Canon Wilfred Marcus Askwith 1938–1942 (later Bishop of Blackburn, then Bishop of Gloucester
- Canon Arthur Stretton Reeve MA 1943–1953 (later Bishop of Lichfield)
- Canon C B Sampson 1953–1961 (formerly vicar of Maidstone, later Canon Residentiary of Ripon Cathedral)
- Canon William Fenton Morley 1961–1971 (later Dean of Salisbury)
- Canon Ronald Graham Gregory Foley 1972–1982 (later Bishop of Reading and Assistant Bishop in the Diocese of York)
- Canon James John Richardson OBE 1982–1988 (subsequently Secretary of the Council of Christians and Jews, Rector of St Peter's Bournemouth and – in retirement – Canon Pastor of Sherborne Abbey.

Edward David Murfet, later Minor Canon at Ripon Cathedral was Priest-in-Charge prior to the establishment of the Parish of Leeds City in 1990

Rectors of Leeds from 1991

- Canon Stephen John Oliver (born 1947) 1991–1997 (later Precentor of St Paul's Cathedral, then Bishop of Stepney until 2010)
- Canon Graham Charles Morell Smith 1997–2005 (later Dean of Norwich)
- Canon Anthony Francis Bundock 2005–2014. (later House for Duty Priest at Lacey Green, St John the Evangelist in the Princes Risborough Team Parish, Diocese of Oxford.
- The Reverend Canon Charles Dobbin MBE Rector of the Moor Allerton Team Ministry took office as Interim Priest at Leeds Minster in November 2014 and undertook that work until September 2015.
- The Reverend Canon Sam Corley was licensed as Rector-designate and Priest in Charge of the Parish of Leeds City on Tuesday 6 October 2015 at 7.30 pm. Canon Corley was installed as an Honorary Canon of Ripon Cathedral at Evensong in Ripon on Sunday 11 October.
- The Reverend Canon Paul Maybury was licensed as Incumbent in December 2022.

== Music ==
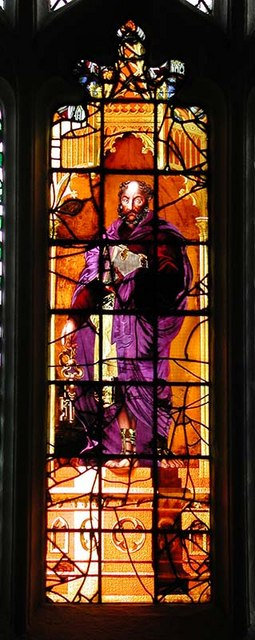
Stained glass window depicting St Peter.

Leeds Minster has a long choral history. The Boys' and Men's Choir sang services on an almost daily basis until 2015, with a separate Girls' Choir founded by Jonathan Lilley in 1997.

Organists from 1842 include Samuel Sebastian Wesley 1842–1849, Dr Edward Bairstow 1906–1913, Dr Alfred Melville Cook 1937–1956, Dr Donald Hunt OBE 1957–1975, and Dr Simon Lindley who came to Leeds after service at St Albans Cathedral and churches in the City of London. Organist and Master of the Music 1975–2016 and only the ninth musical incumbent since Wesley's day, Lindley remained organist at Leeds Town Hall until Summer 2017 when his place there as City Organist, Host of the Organ series and Organ Curator, has been taken by Darius Battiwalla. Paul Dewhurst, previously Organist of Pontefract Parish Church (St Giles), succeeded as Director of Music at Leeds Minster from November 2016. Dewhurst is also conductor of Hull Choral Union and Wakefield Festival Chorus and moved to Bridlington Priory as Director of Music in January 2020. He was succeeded at Leeds by Alexander Woodrow, with David Houlder remaining in post as Sub-Organist, a position he has held since moving to Leeds from Liverpool Cathedral in 2003.

Following the suspension of boy and girl choristers in 2015, the present Choir of Leeds Minster is an adult chamber choir of approximately two dozen voices, consisting of skilled volunteer singers alongside a complement of choral scholars (undergraduates from the Universities of Leeds and York and Leeds College of Music) and supernumerary singers. During term time, Evensong is sung by the full choir on Thursday evenings as well as the two fully choral services each Sunday. A semi-professional adult chamber choir, Saint Peter's Singers of Leeds founded in 1977 meets for rehearsals on Sunday evening during term time and presents regular concerts as well as singing at a number of choral services each season both with the Minster Choir and on their own as a separate unit.

The Minster Choir has been associated with the Royal School of Church Music since the early 1930s through links with RSCM's founder Sir Sydney Nicholson and with churchwarden Herbert Bacon Smith. Previous Organist Simon Lindley was one of the RSCM's longest-serving special commissioners and has directed RSCM courses on four continents.

=== Organ concerts ===
Friday lunchtime organ recitals are held weekly between September and July, featuring both the Minster's professional organists and a wide array of guest recitalists. Sunday evening concerts have taken place weekly in August since the restoration of the instrument was completed.

=== Organists ===
- 1842 Dr Samuel Sebastian Wesley (afterwards organist at Winchester Cathedral and Gloucester Cathedral)
- 1849 Robert Senior Burton (afterwards organist at St Peter's Church, Harrogate)
- 1880 Dr William Creser (afterwards organist of Her Majesty's Chapel Royal St James's Palace
- 1891 Alfred Benton (afterwards organist of Covington Roman Catholic Cathedral, Kentucky USA)
- 1906 Dr Edward Bairstow (from Wigan Parish Church, afterwards organist and master of the choristers of York Minster)
- 1913 Willoughby Williams (afterwards organist of St Peter's Episcopal Church, Oakland, California, USA)
- 1920 Dr Albert Charles Tysoe (afterwards organist of St Albans Cathedral)
- 1937 Dr (Alfred) Melville Cook (afterwards organist and master of the choristers of Hereford Cathedral and conductor of the Three Choirs Festival)
- 1957 Dr Donald Frederick Hunt OBE (afterwards master of the choristers and organist of Worcester Cathedral and conductor of the Three Choirs Festival)
- 1975 Dr Simon Geoffrey Lindley (from St Albans Cathedral) – President of the Royal College of Organists, 2000–2002 – Vice-President, from 2003; President of the Incorporated Association of Organists, 2003–2005.
- 2016 Paul Dewhurst from St Giles' Church Pontefract: from 1 November 2016
- 2020 Alexander Woodrow (from Solihull School and St Alphege's Parish Church, Solihull, formerly Organist and Director of Music at Bradford Cathedral)

=== Samuel Sebastian Wesley 200th Anniversary Celebrations ===
The 200th-anniversary celebrations for Samuel Sebastian Wesley, born 14 August 1810, began with Festal Evensong on Sunday 4 July 2010 followed by a Gala Choral Recital. Worship on Sunday 15 August was broadcast on BBC Radio Four. Dr Lindley gave a commemorative recital of Wesley's organ music in the evening and a commemorative recital of music by Wesley at Leeds Town Hall on 13 September.

== Graveyard ==
The church had a graveyard and grounds on the opposite side of the Kirkgate road. The graveyard was closed to burials in the 1830s and that land eventually became Penny Pocket Park.

== Rugby league ==
A rugby league team from Leeds Parish Church joined the Northern Rugby Football Union (now Rugby Football League) in 1896. Leeds Parish Church played for five seasons from 1896–97 to 1900–01 after which it withdrew.

== See also ==
- Grade I listed churches in West Yorkshire
- Listed buildings in Leeds (City and Hunslet Ward - southern area)
