= Kirkgate, Leeds =

Street in Leeds, England

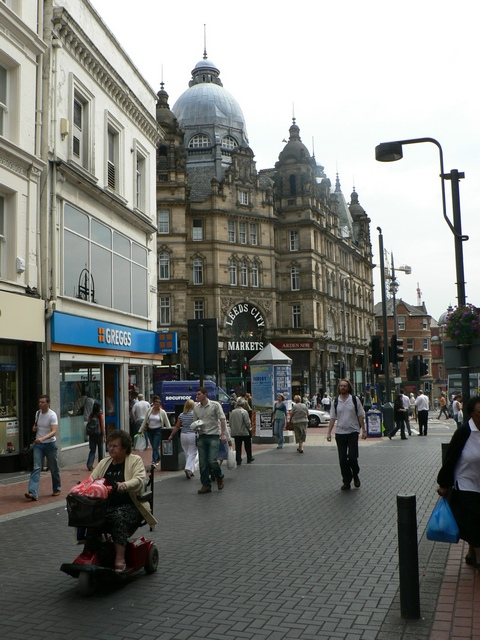
View down Kirkgate, towards the markets

Kirkgate (/ˈkɜːrɡət/) is a street in the city centre of Leeds, in England.

== History ==
Building number 85 collapsed in April 2024

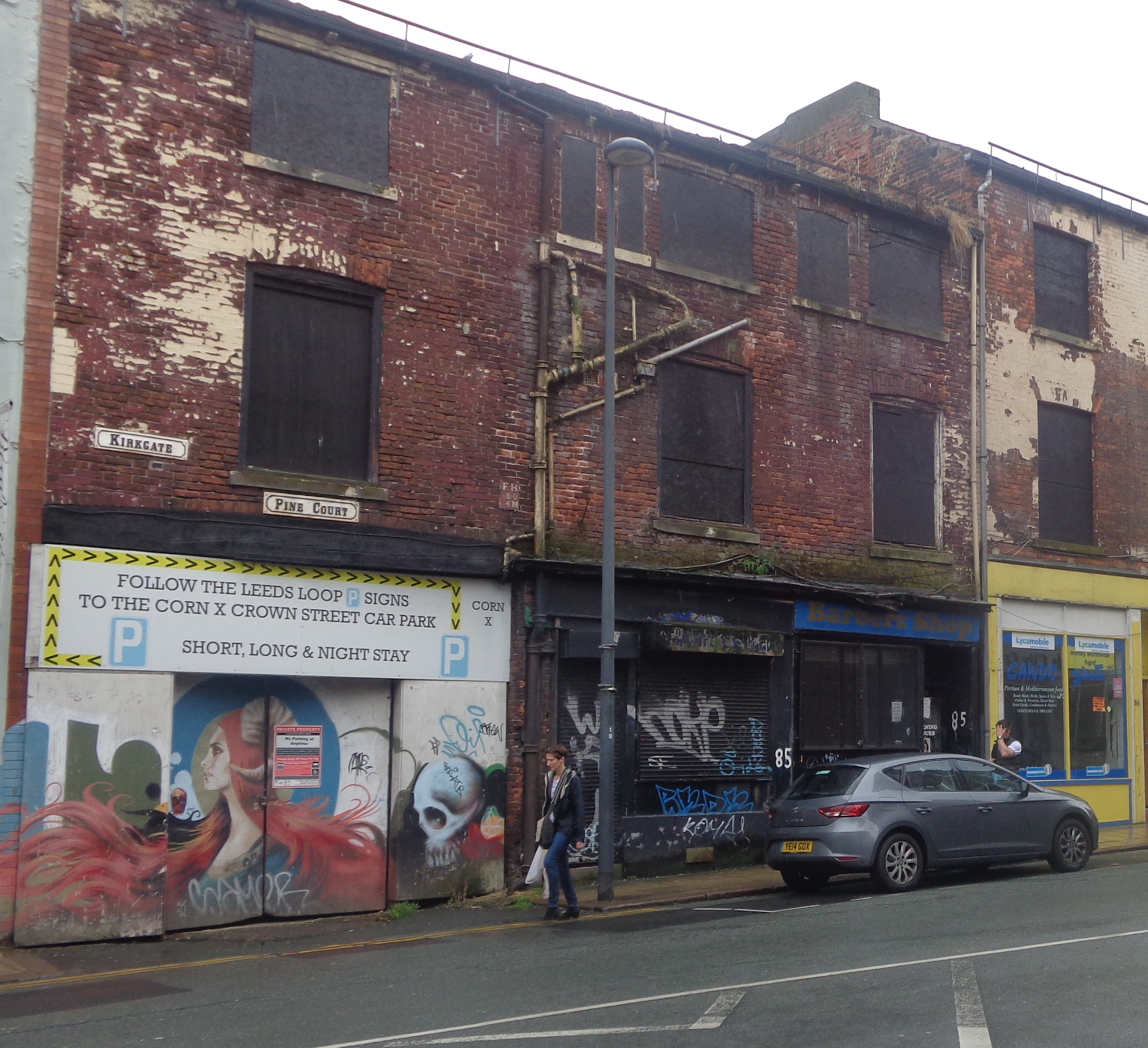
Pre-collapse, July 2014

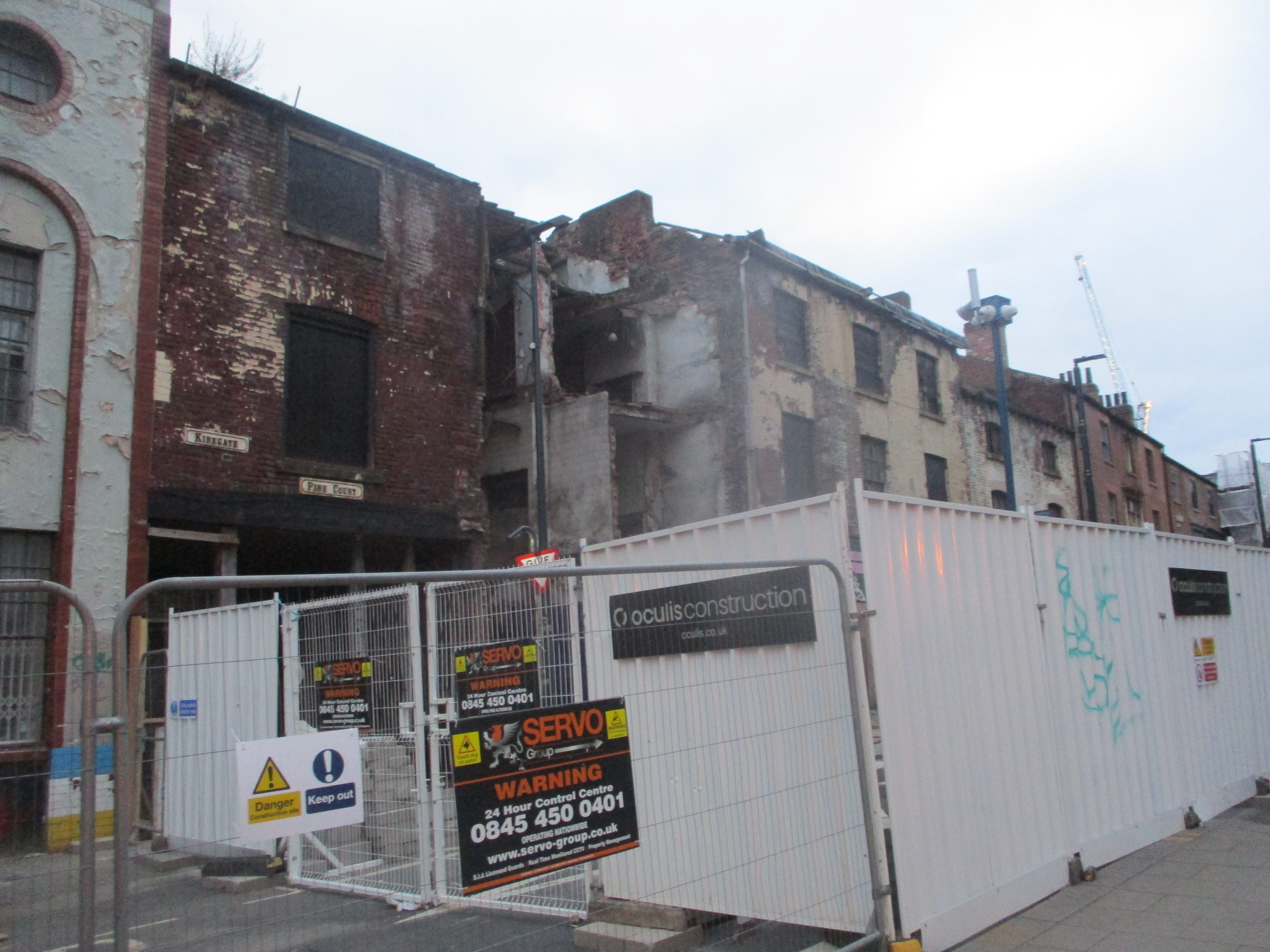
Post-collapse, May 2024

The street originated in the Mediaeval period, leading from the centre of the settlement to the parish church. The Anglo-Saxon Leeds Cross was found when the church was replaced by the current Leeds Minster, in the 19th century. By the time of the Domesday Book, Leeds also had a manor house, which lay on the street. The street became associated with cloth manufacturing, and in 1711, the First White Cloth Hall was constructed on the street. Other early buildings included a chantry, built in 1430, later replaced by a vicarage, the town's bakehouse, and a prison, built in 1655.

The city's first hospital was established in a house on the street in 1767. In 1790, the Ancient Order of Foresters was founded at the Crown Inn on the street, although the building was demolished in 1935. In the 19th century, the Kirkgate Market was constructed at the city centre end of the street, while a railway line was built, spanning the middle of the street.

In 1984, a police officer, John Speed, was shot and killed on the street, and there is a memorial in his memory.

Leeds City Council announced a regeneration programme in April 2016, named the Lower Kirkgate Townscape Heritage Initiative, with an aim to improve vacant buildings in the southern end of Kirkgate. This included the restoration of 1st White Cloth Hall, which was announced in March 2018.

On 12 April 2024, a dilapidated property collapsed onto the road on the southern end of Kirkgate. The collapse took out the telephone lines of neighbouring businesses but resulted in no injuries. The council had previously approached the building's owner about receiving a grant as part of the council's regeneration scheme, but terms couldn't be agreed upon. On 14 August 2024, the council proposed issuing an urgent works notice for other buildings most at risk of collapse on Kirkgate; they also proposed an acquisition of seven properties owned by the same company. The urgent works notice was approved by the government four months later, and was served on 18 December 2024. The southern part of Kirkgate remains closed to motor vehicle traffic as a result of the collapse.

The Welcome to Leeds website notes that the street became run-down, but by the 2020s became "a more calm street which has recently been reinvigorated by exciting local businesses".

== Layout and architecture ==
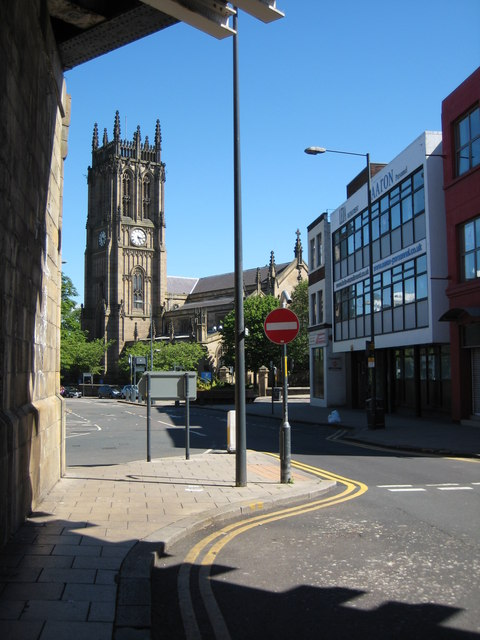
View under the railway bridge, to Leeds Minster

The street runs south-east from the junction of Briggate and Commercial Street, to a junction with East Street and Duke Street. Fish Street, Vicar Lane, New York Street, Harper Street, Cross York Street, and Church Lane lead off its north-east side, while Central Road, New Market Street, Call Lane, Wharf Street, High Court, and Maude Street lead off its south-west side.

Notable buildings on the north-east side of Kirkgate include the grade I listed Kirkgate Market. On the south-west side of the street lie the former bank at 110 Kirkgate, designed by William Bakewell; the grade II* listed First White Cloth Hall; and the grade I listed Leeds Minster.
