= Leeds City Centre Loop Road =

The Leeds city centre Loop Road was a one-way traffic route of approximately two miles within the city centre of Leeds, which encircled a large section of the shopping and retail district. It comprised the following eighteen junctions. It stopped functioning as a complete loop after Leeds City Council closed access to City Square in September 2022.

== Junctions ==
City Loop

1. City Square
2. Bank of England
3. Town Hall
4. Civic Hall
5. Cathedral
6. St. Johns
7. Merrion
8. Grand Theatre
9. North Street
10. Regent Street
11. Eastgate
12. Quarry Hill
13. Crown Point
14. Parish Church
15. The Calls
16. Bridge End
17. Sovereign
18. Bishopgate
