= Leeds Philharmonic Society =

Leeds Philharmonic Chorus is a leading choir in Europe, regularly performing to professional standards with internationally renowned soloists, orchestras and conductors.

As well as traditional concerts in Leeds Town Hall, the Chorus has toured and performed in many other prestigious venues including the Royal Albert Hall (London), Bridgewater Hall (Manchester), Symphony Hall, Birmingham, The Sage Gateshead, Franz Liszt Academy of Music (Budapest) and St. Stephen's Cathedral, Vienna.

Easter 2009 saw the Chorus touring Poland with a varied programme including the Polish première of Karl Jenkins' The Armed Man.

== History ==
"The Leeds Philharmonic Society is the senior choir in the city by date of foundation and by virtue of its continued and very distinguished programme sustained annually since 1870". Simon Lindley

Leeds Philharmonic Society has over 130 singing members regularly performing concerts at Leeds Town Hall. Performances are often jointly promoted with Leeds International Concert Season and the BBC. Repertoire is extensive, combining both tradition and innovation.

In recent years the Chorus has recorded Stanford's Stabat Mater and Te Deum for Chandos, Walton's Gloria and Belshazzar's Feast for Naxos and Handel's Messiah for CMI Records.

Early in its history the Chorus gave performances of new works conducted by composers such as Sir Edward Elgar, Sir Hubert Parry and Sir Arthur Sullivan. More recently, the Society gave the first broadcast performance of Geoffrey Burgon's Requiem and has commissioned works from James Brown, Donald Hunt, and Philip Wilby.

Unfamiliar and demanding works have been a frequent feature of programmes. Recent examples include Franz Schmidt's The Book with Seven Seals, Rachmaninov's The Bells (with the St. Petersburg Symphony Orchestra), John Adams' Harmonium, Wilby's Bronte Mass (World Premiere) and Frederick Delius's Mass of Life.

Dr David Hill is Leeds Philharmonic Society's Musical Director and Conductor. Hill was appointed to the post of Chief Conductor of the BBC Singers in 2007 to which he then added Associate Guest Conductor of The Bournemouth Symphony Orchestra. The Society's Chorus Master is Joe Judge, who is also Artistic Director of the Exon Festival and of the Leeds Guild of Singers.

Easter 2009 saw the chorus touring Poland (supported by Yorkshire Forward) including the Polish premiere of Karl Jenkins' Armed Man with the Capella Cracoviensis Chamber Orchestra.
