= Tourism in Leeds =

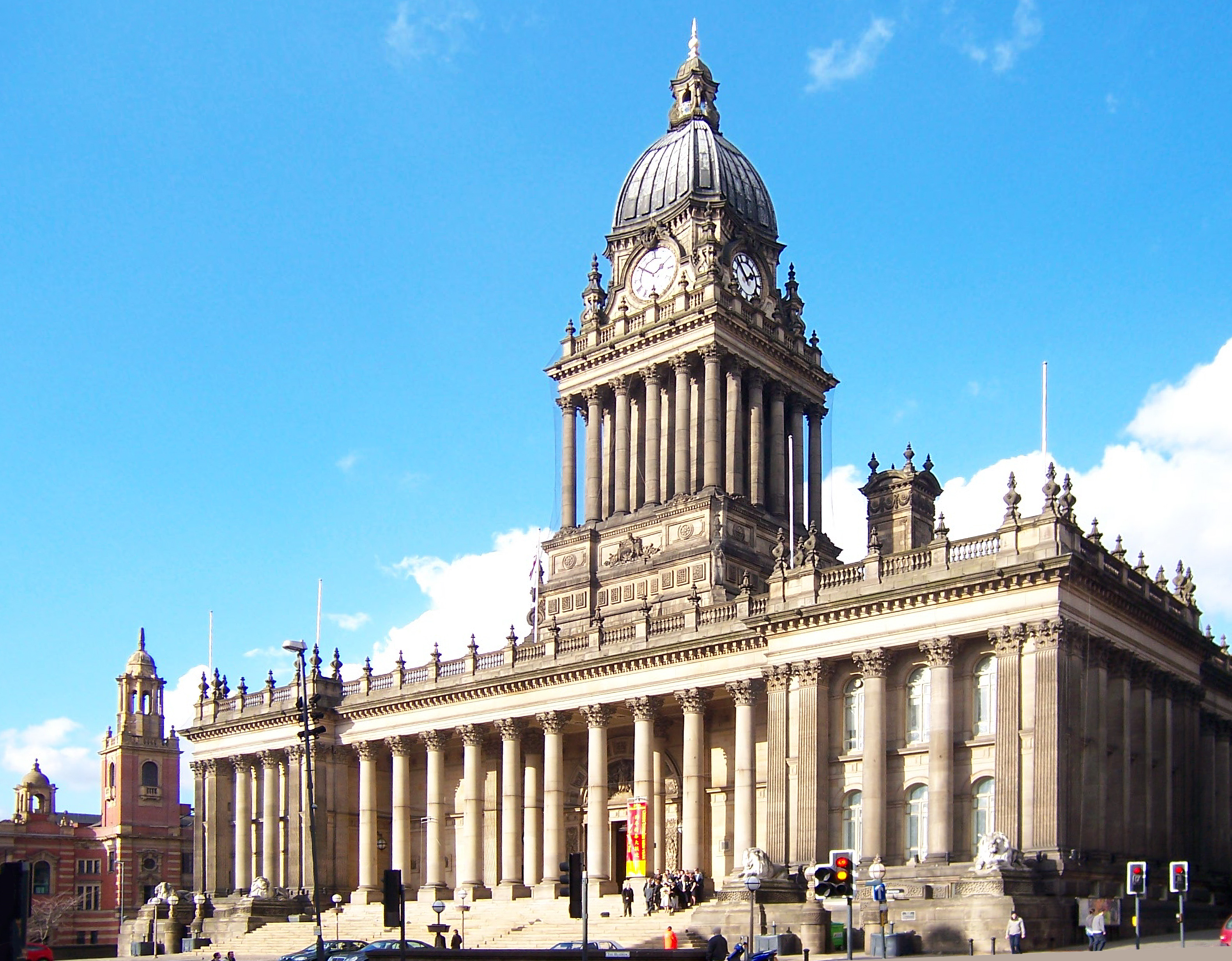
Leeds Town Hall - one of the city's main landmarks

Leeds in West Yorkshire, England, is a tourist destination.

In the 2017 Condé Nast Traveler survey of readers, Leeds rated 6th among The 15 Best Cities in the UK for visitors. Lonely Planet named Leeds as one of the top 10 cities to visit in 2017.

== Arrival ==
Leeds has many transport links by which tourists can arrive. The city is served by Leeds Bradford Airport, which has direct links to most major British and European airports as well as several direct links further afield. Leeds railway station is one of the UK's principal railway stations and links to regional towns and cities, as well as many major cities. The cities main tourist information office is situated at the railway station. The nearest port is the Port of Hull, with passenger connections to Zeebrugge and Rotterdam. Leeds is linked by motorways in all directions by the M1 (South), M62 (East and West) and the A1(M) (North and South). The city is linked by National Express coaches all major UK cities.

== Visitor data ==
Tourism in Leeds in 2017 was estimated to support over 20,000 full-time equivalent jobs.

In 2017 Leeds had 26.6 million day visitors, contributing £1.19bn to the economy, and received 29.01 million day and night visitors, bringing £1.75bn to the local economy. Between 2013 - 2017 the economic impact of tourism to the economy increased by 16.6%, with staying visitors increasing by 22.6%. Overall visitor numbers also increased by 6.3% between 2015 and 2016.

== Attractions ==
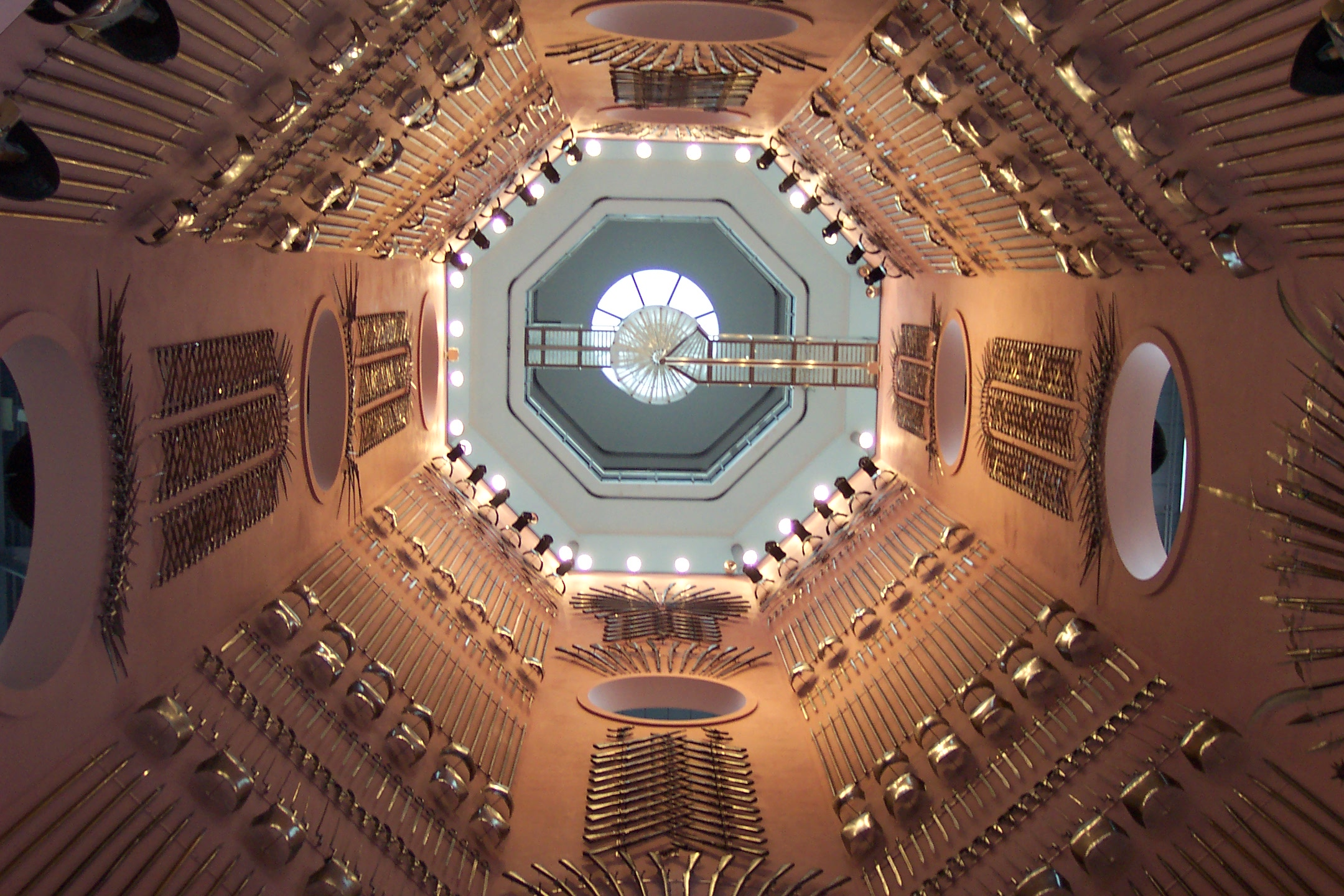
Royal Armouries Museum, Leeds: Looking up the main stairwell

Major national and regional attractions include the Royal Armouries, the Henry Moore Sculpture Centre, West Yorkshire Playhouse and Harewood House, which was voted one of the best large visitor attractions in the Excellence in England Awards for Tourism 2003. Leeds is also the only city outside London to have both its own opera and ballet companies – the Opera North and Northern Ballet Theatre. Leeds Civic Trust offers walking tours of the city.

Readers of TripAdvisor rated the following as the top four things to do in Leeds: Roundhay Park, Royal Armouries Museum, City Varieties Music Hall, Abbey House Museum. Favourite architectural buildings were Leeds Minster, Harewood House, Thornton's Arcade and Leeds Civic Hall.

=== List of Leeds attractions ===
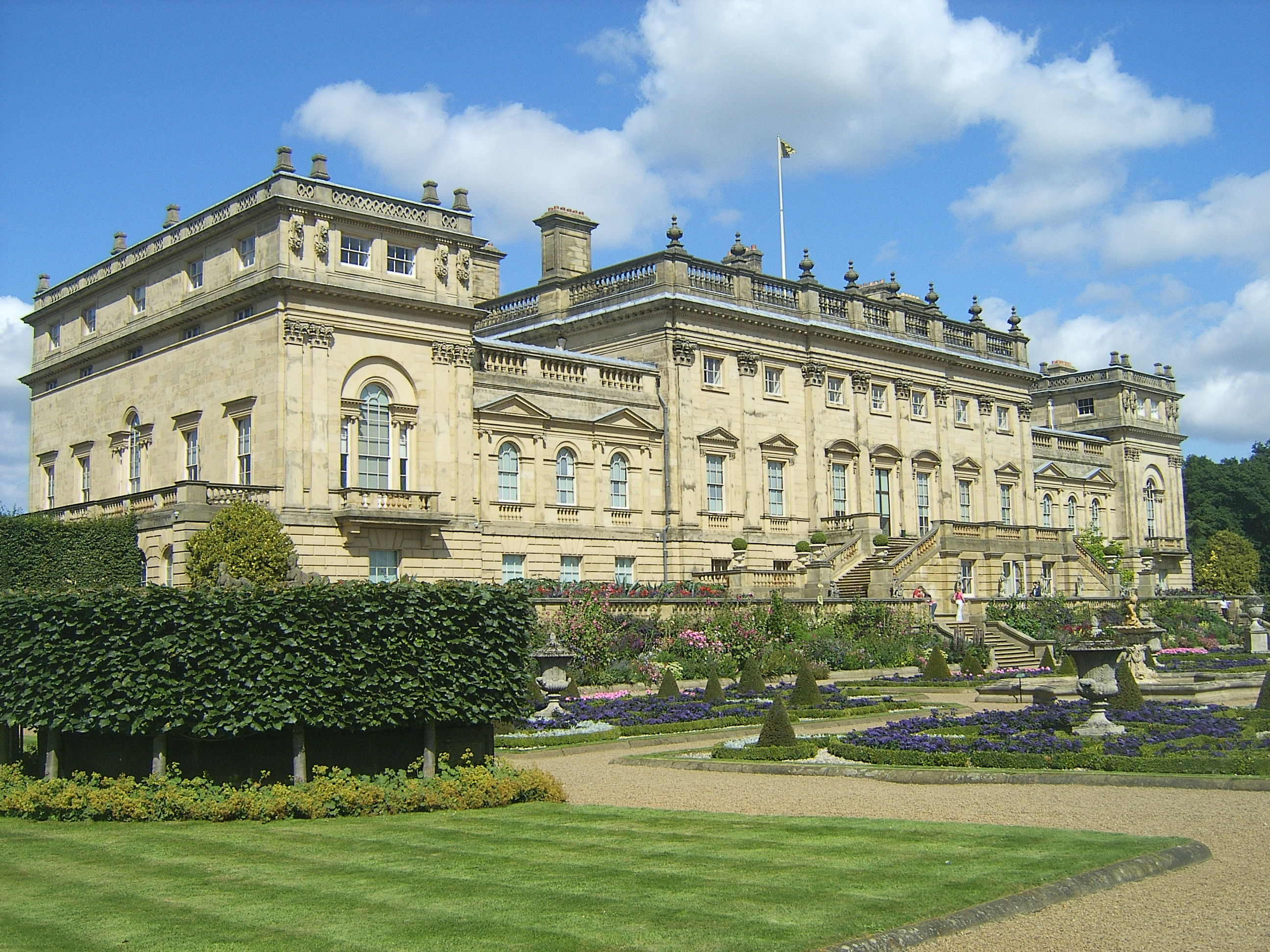
Harewood House in 2005, seen from the garden

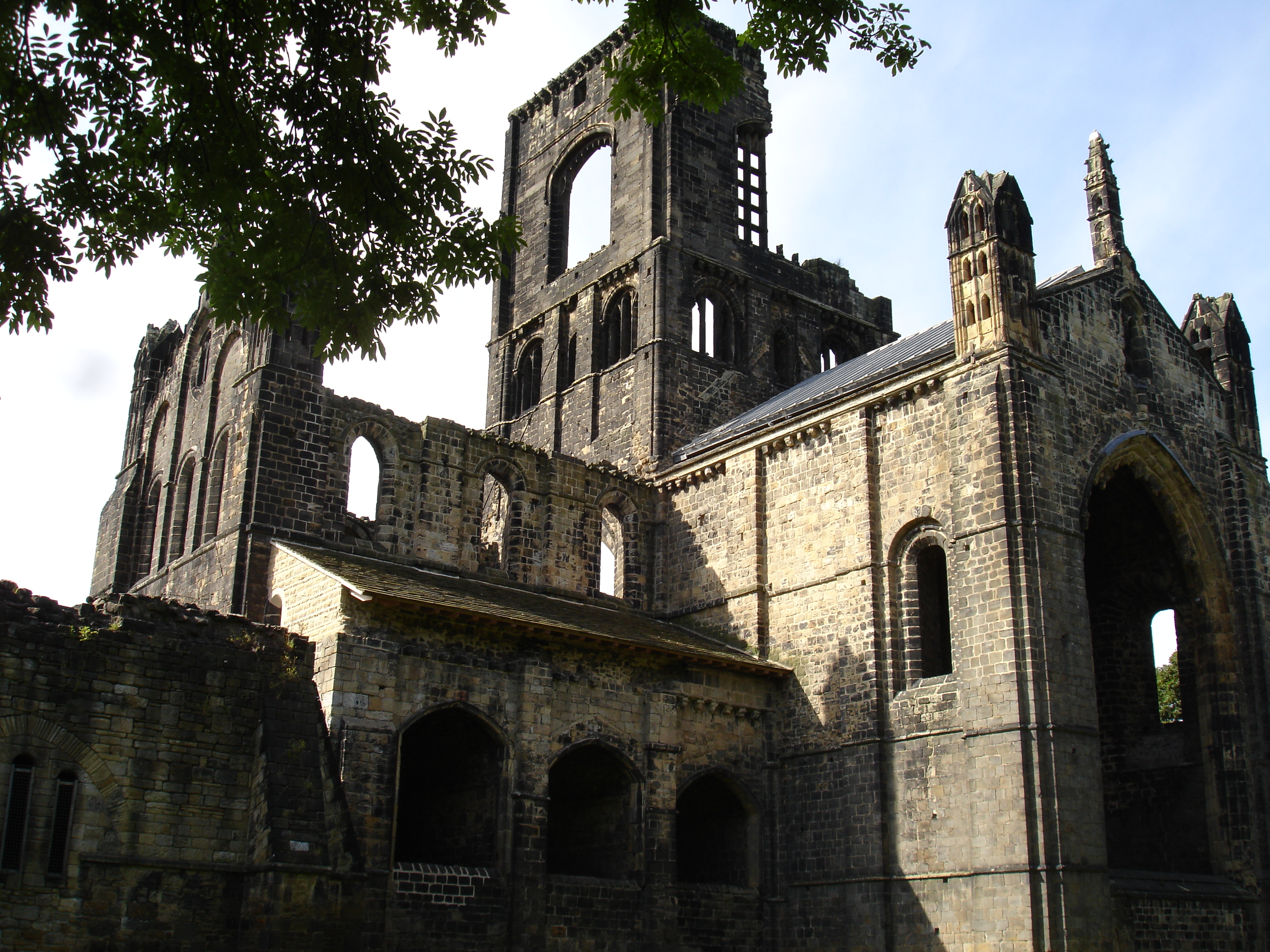
Kirkstall Abbey

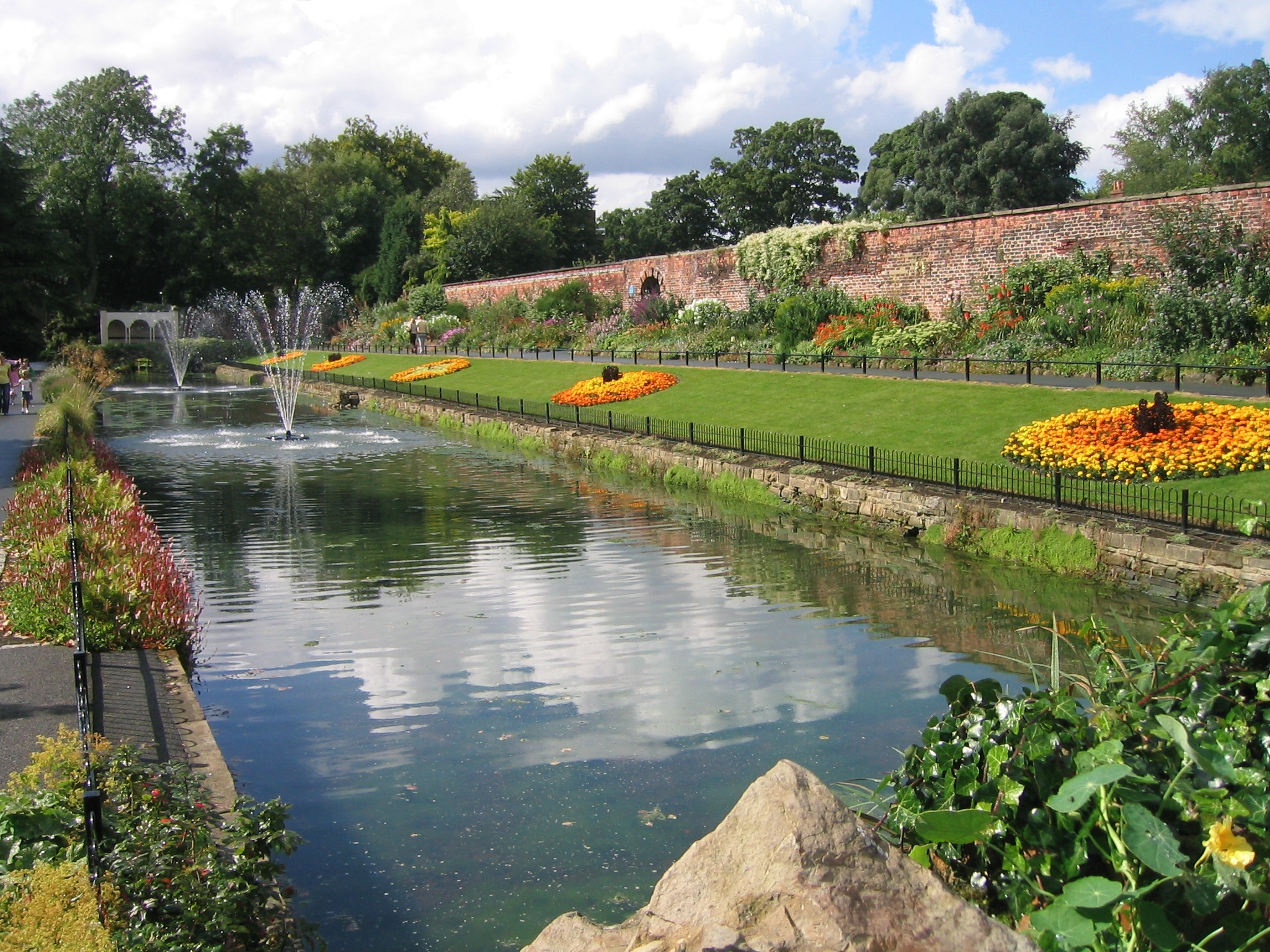
Part of Canal Gardens at Roundhay Park

- Harewood House (Out of the City on A61 towards Harrogate)
- Temple Newsam
- Lotherton Hall
- Roundhay Park
- Tropical World
- Bramham Park (South of Wetherby)
- Golden Acre Park
- The Hollies Arboretum
- Royal Armouries Museum
- Leeds City Art Gallery
- Thackray Medical Museum
- Kirkstall Abbey
- Abbey House Museum
- Armley Mills Industrial Museum
- Thwaite Mills Museum
- Middleton Railway
- Leeds City Museum
- Leeds Theatres (West Yorkshire Playhouse, Civic Theatre, Grand Theatre, City Varieties, Carriageworks Theatre)

== Sport venues ==
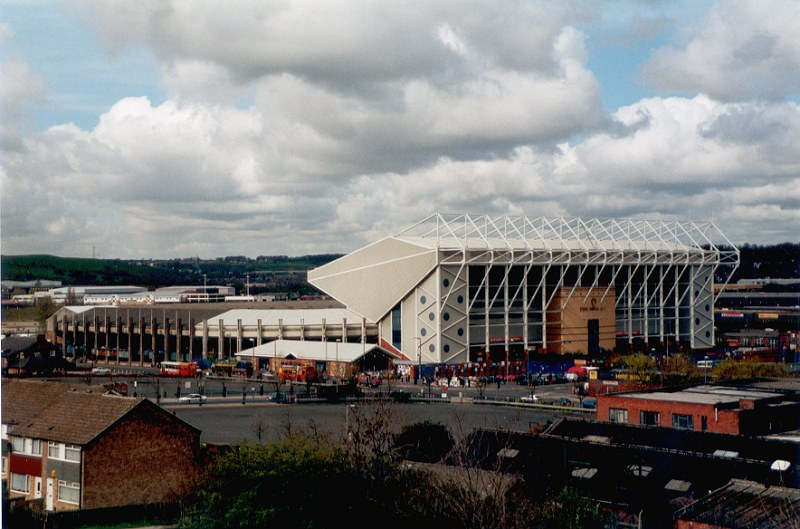
Elland Road from the East

Leeds is known for hosting sporting events, with international competitions being held in the city, including the Grand Départ of the Tour de France in 2014, Rugby World Cup 2015 and the ITU World Triathlon Series Leeds in 2016, 2017, 2018.

In 2019 Leeds is hosting several major international sporting events: The Cricket World Cup, the UCI World Championships, the ITU World Triathlon Series, Tour de Yorkshire, Third Specsavers Ashes Test Match and 2019 IFAF Women's European Championship.

Only ten minutes from the city centre, the Emerald Headingley Stadium is one of the biggest sporting stadiums in Leeds with a 22,000 capacity. It is the home of Yorkshire County Cricket Club, Leeds Rhinos and Yorkshire Carnegie and is currently undergoing a £40 million development of the North-South Stand, a facility that adjoins both the cricket and rugby grounds. Another sports stadium is Elland Road Football Stadium, the 40,000 capacity home of Leeds United.

== Events ==
Light Night is a fixture on the calendar, turning the city into an art installation.

Other festivals include Leeds International Film Festival, Leeds International Piano Competition, Leeds West Indian Carnival and Leeds Festival.

== Hotels ==
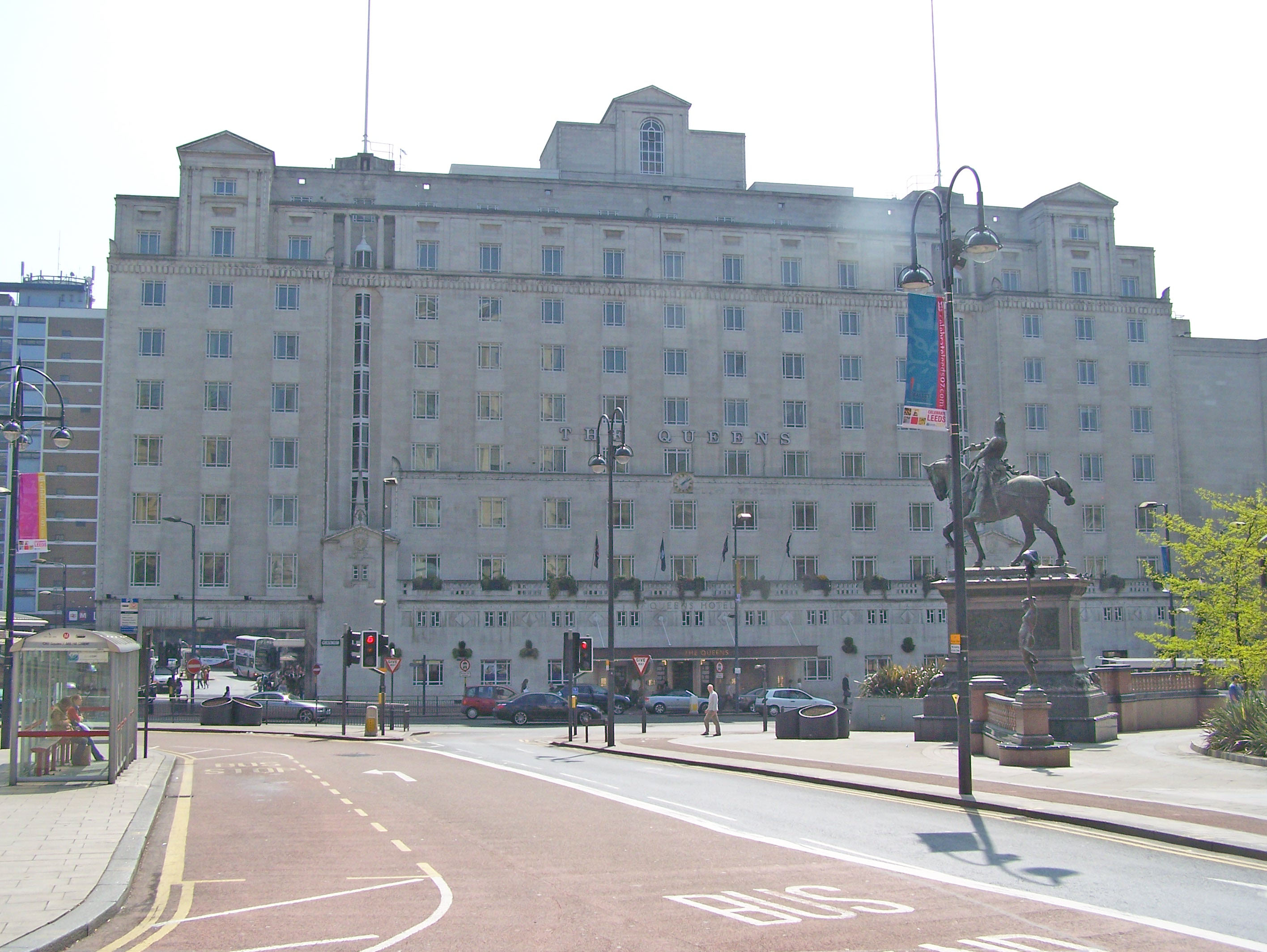
The Queens Hotel

Hotels in Leeds city centre include Malmaison, DoubleTree by Hilton, Radisson Blu, 42 The Calls, Quebecs Hotel, Leeds, The Queens, Novotel and The Marriott.

== Eating and drinking ==
Leeds has many popular pubs, bars and restaurants in the city centre. The historic Whitelock's Ale House on Briggate and the Adelphi public house on Hunslet Lane (adjacent to the Tetley's Brewery) are notable public houses. The range of restaurants and bars in Leeds covers all budget ranges and includes a diverse street food offer.

== Popular areas ==
Besides the city centre, many people visit Hyde Park and Headingley for the student sub culture and the interesting mix of pubs, cafés and bars. Chapel Allerton, Roundhay and Horsforth are popular due to the upmarket bars and restaurants in these areas. The market towns of Wetherby and Otley come under the City of Leeds and are also both popular with day tourists, Wetherby being particularly busy after a meeting at Wetherby Racecourse.
