= The Calls =

Street and area of Leeds, West Yorkshire, England

Coordinates: 53.794°N 1.538°W

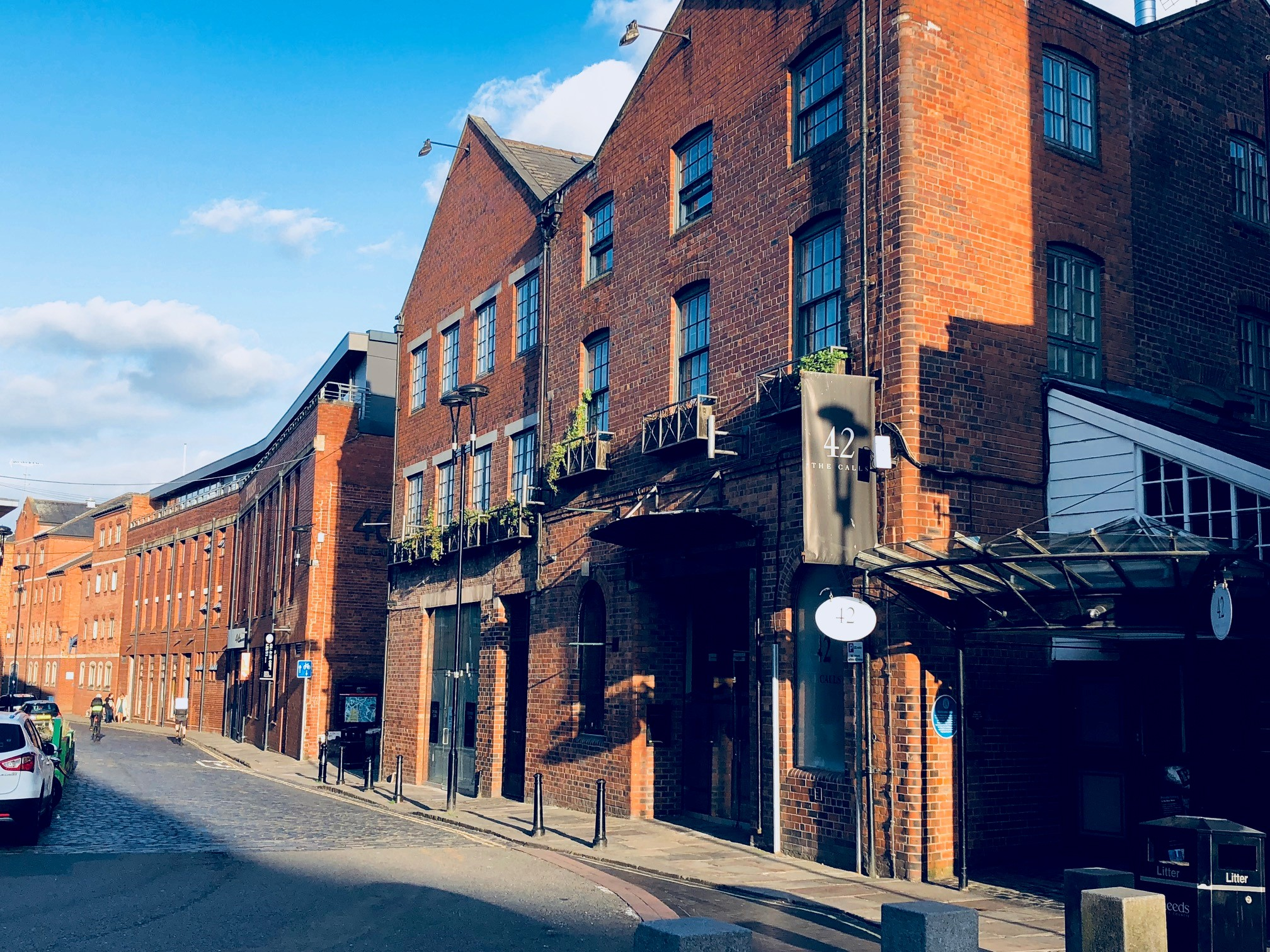
42 The Calls Hotel

The Calls is an area and street by the River Aire in Leeds city centre, West Yorkshire, England. This district falls within the City and Hunslet ward of the City of Leeds Council. Formerly an area of industry in Leeds, it has now been regenerated with a mixture of uses: primarily offices, residential and leisure.

== Etymology ==
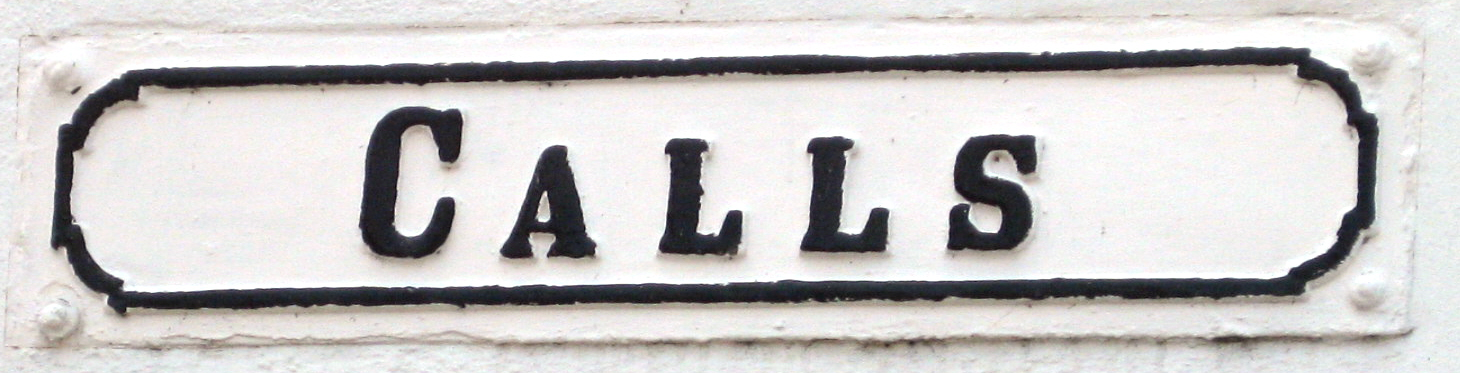
Street sign

The first evidence for the existence of the place-name The Calls is the street-name Call Lane, first attested in 1557, but presumably referring to The Calls. The place-name The Calls is first attested in its own right in 1668, with the French definite article le, as Le Calls. The place first appears on maps from John Cossins' 1726 Plan of Leeds, which shows a street labelled "Calls" running from the Leeds Bridge to Leeds Parish Church. The old street sign also shows it as "Calls", without "the".

The origin of the name Calls is uncertain. Recent local history books frequently give the etymology as the Latin word callis ('a stony footway, foot-path'). However, this word is not found elsewhere in English usage or place-names, making it an unlikely origin for The Calls. Rather, the usual authority on English place-names, the English Place-Name Society, concluded that the name was 'probably' from the Northern English dialect word caul, meaning 'weir' (whose origin is itself obscure). At the time of the publication of the Society's volumes on West Yorkshire, the Oxford English Dictionary listed the earliest attestation of this word as 1805, but other research showed the word in use already in the sixteenth century. Another possibility, however, is that the name comes from the Northern English dialect word call 'place where cows are driven'.

== History ==
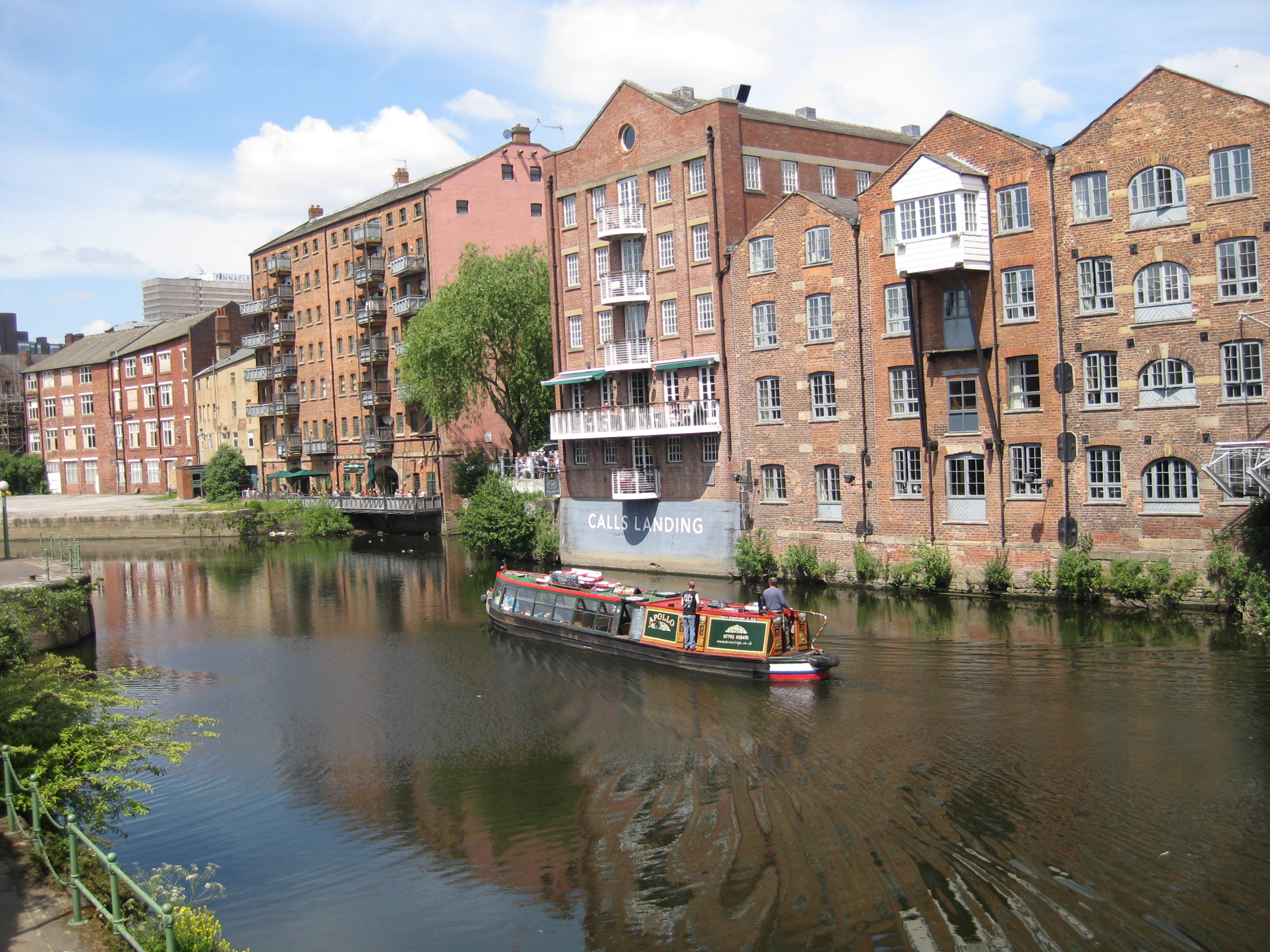
Calls buildings backing on to the River Aire

It is thought that in Roman times there was a ford over the River Aire near the present Leeds Bridge. "The Calls" was originally an open space mainly of orchards, but is now a built up area. The Calls area along with neighbouring Clarence Dock served as docks on the Leeds and Liverpool Canal and the Aire and Calder Navigation throughout the Industrial Revolution and the early 20th century.

The area's decline began in the early 20th century when Leeds' industry moved away from the centre out towards Hunslet, Holbeck, Armley and Kirkstall. From 1985 to 1995 Leeds Corporation carried out a major regeneration with careful conversion of listed building warehouses and new build in sympathetic style for a mixed use area. This includes the historic Fletlands Corn Mills into a boutique hotel, 42 The Calls Hotel, in 1991. The Centenary Footbridge by Ove Arup & Partners across the river to Brewery Wharf was opened in 1993. A silver ball fountain was installed to commemorate this work.

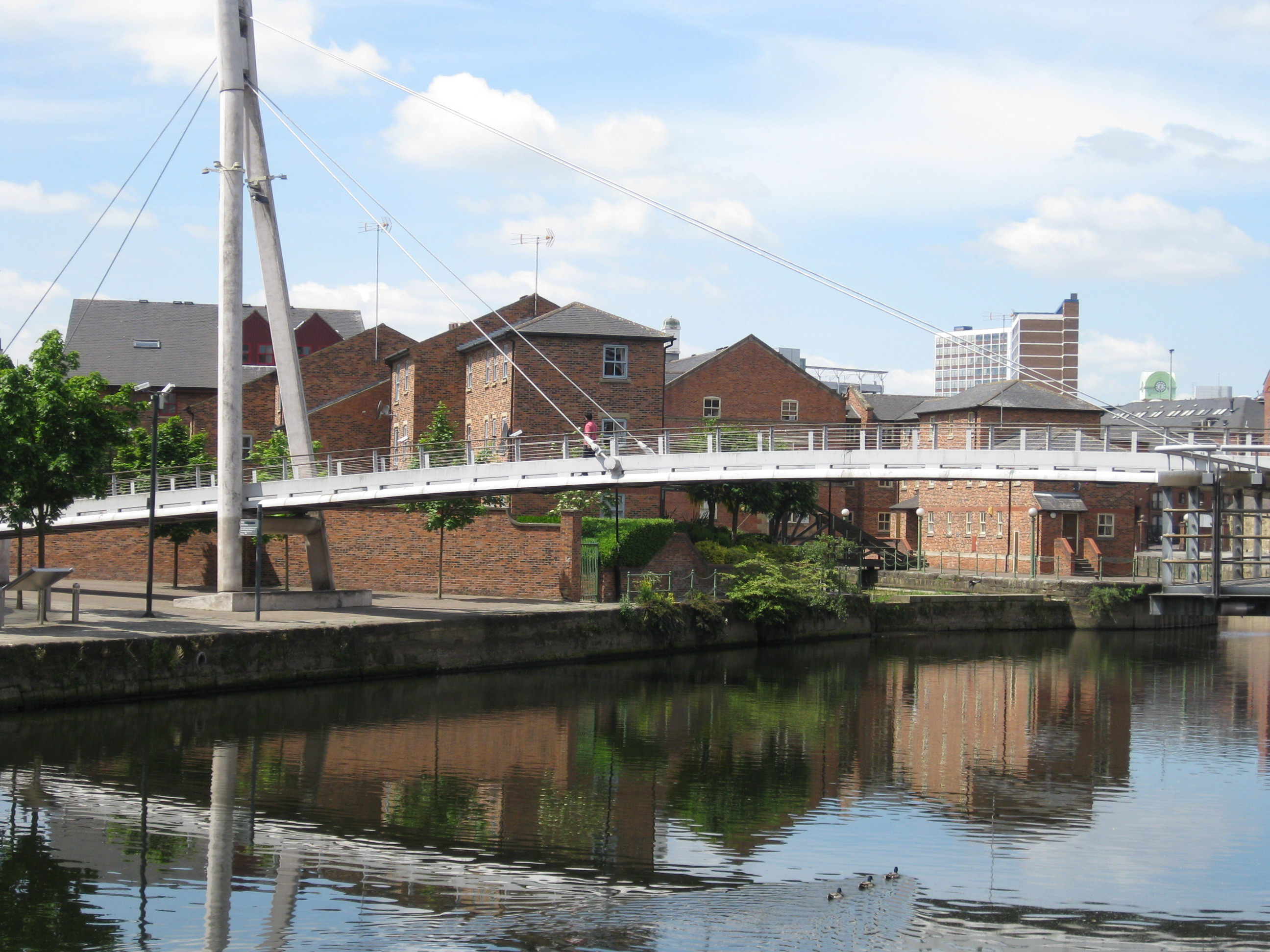
Centenary Footbridge

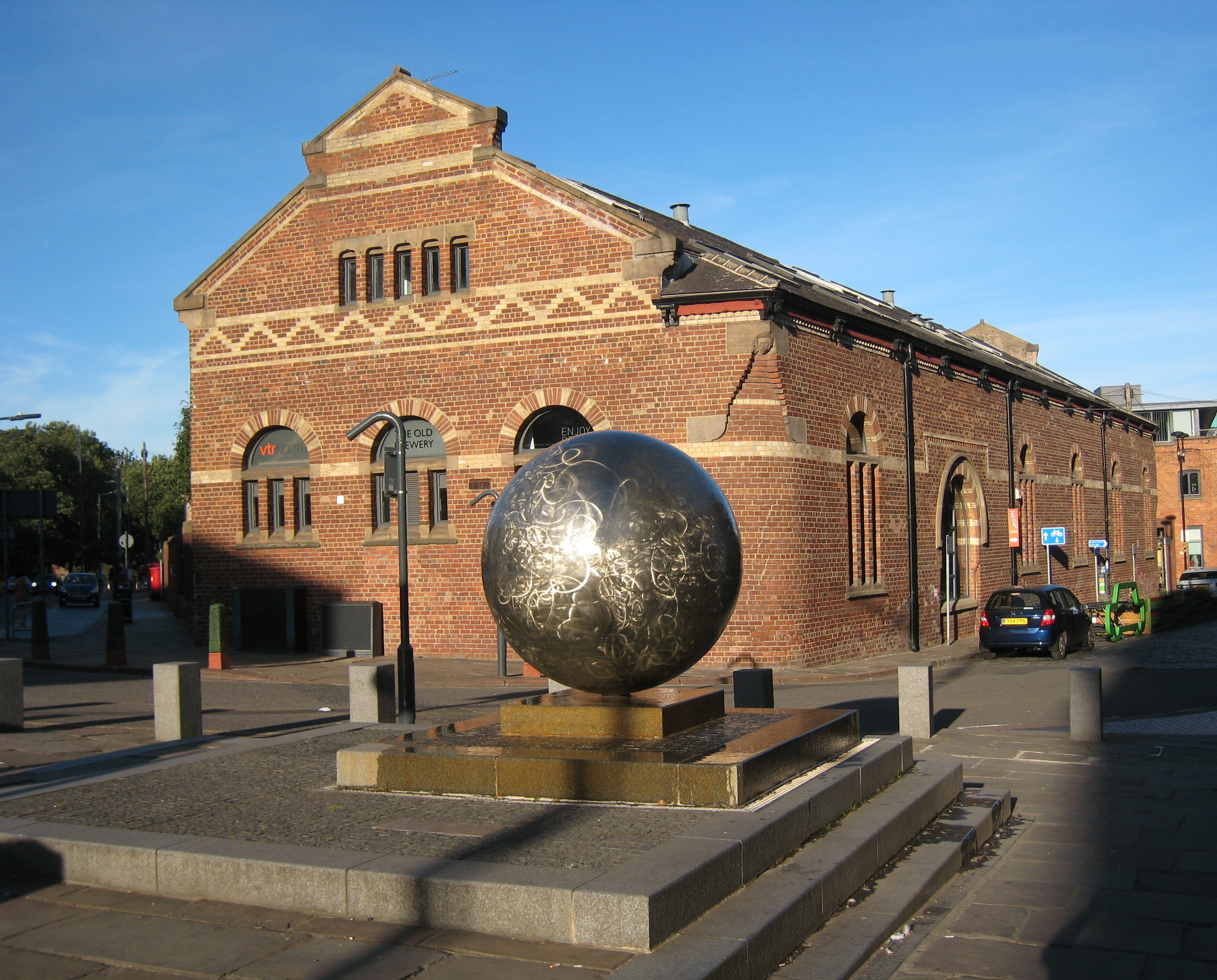
Silver ball fountain

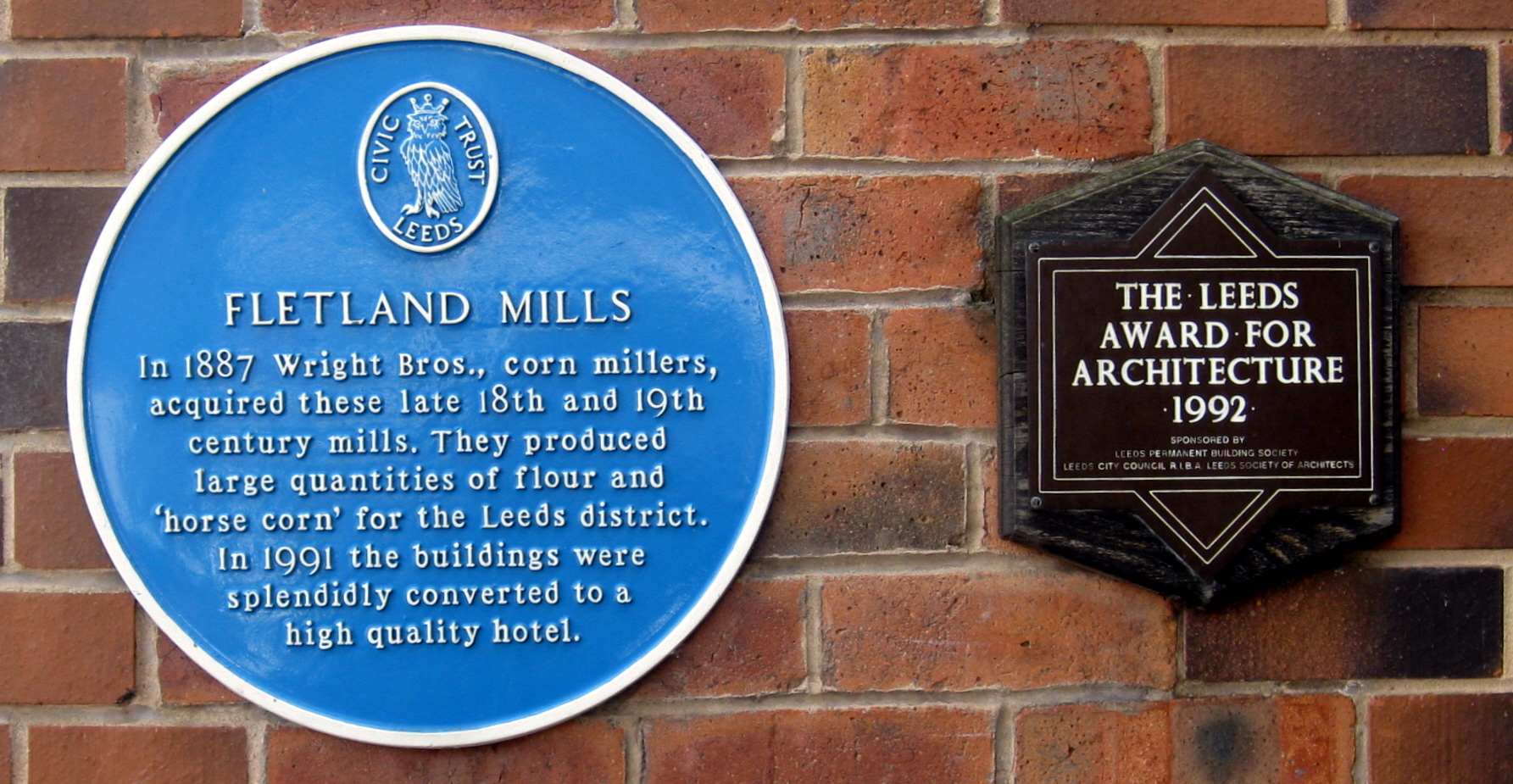
Civic Trust plaque and Leeds Award for Architecture on Fletland Mills

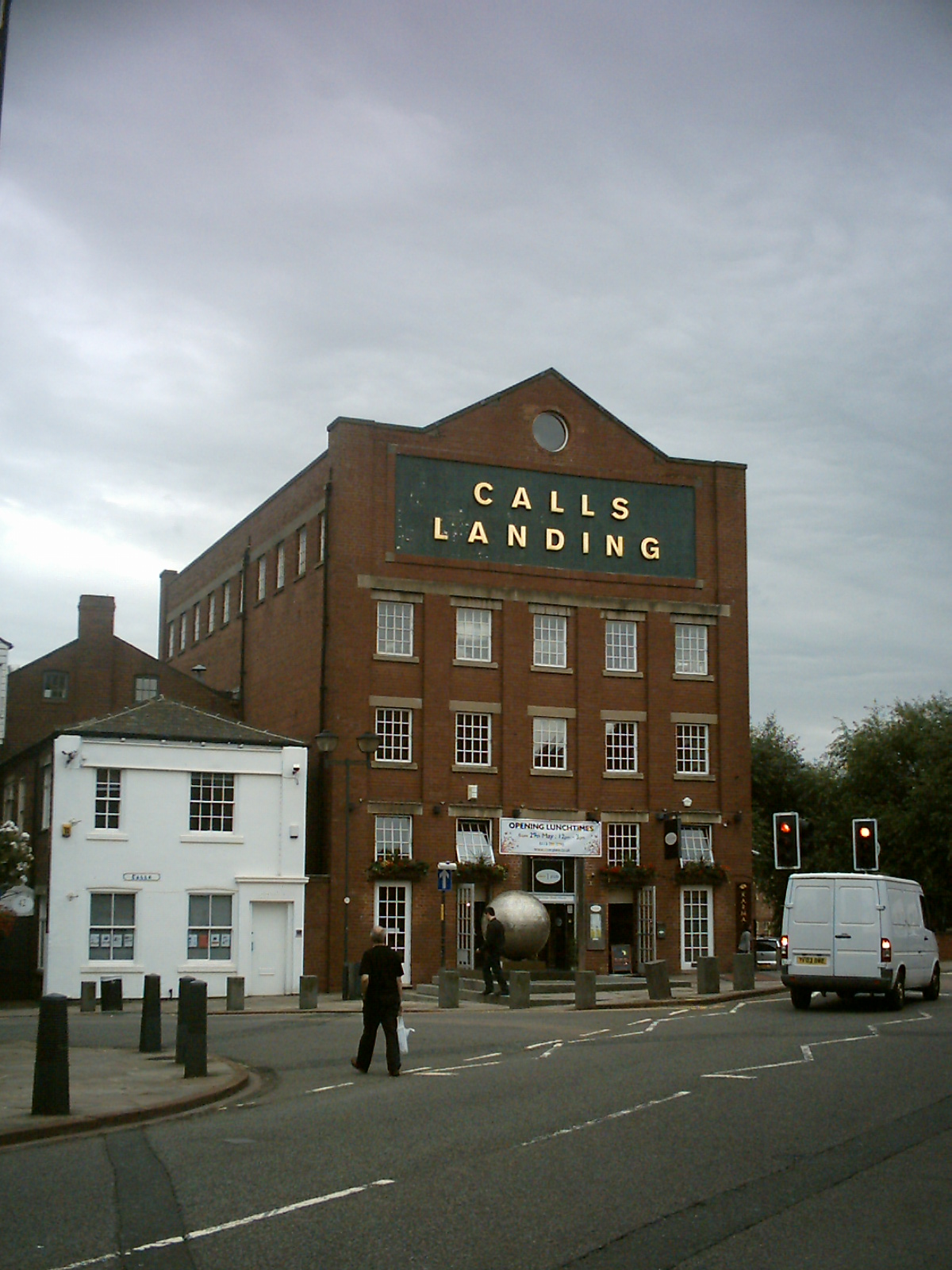
Calls Landing

== Leisure ==
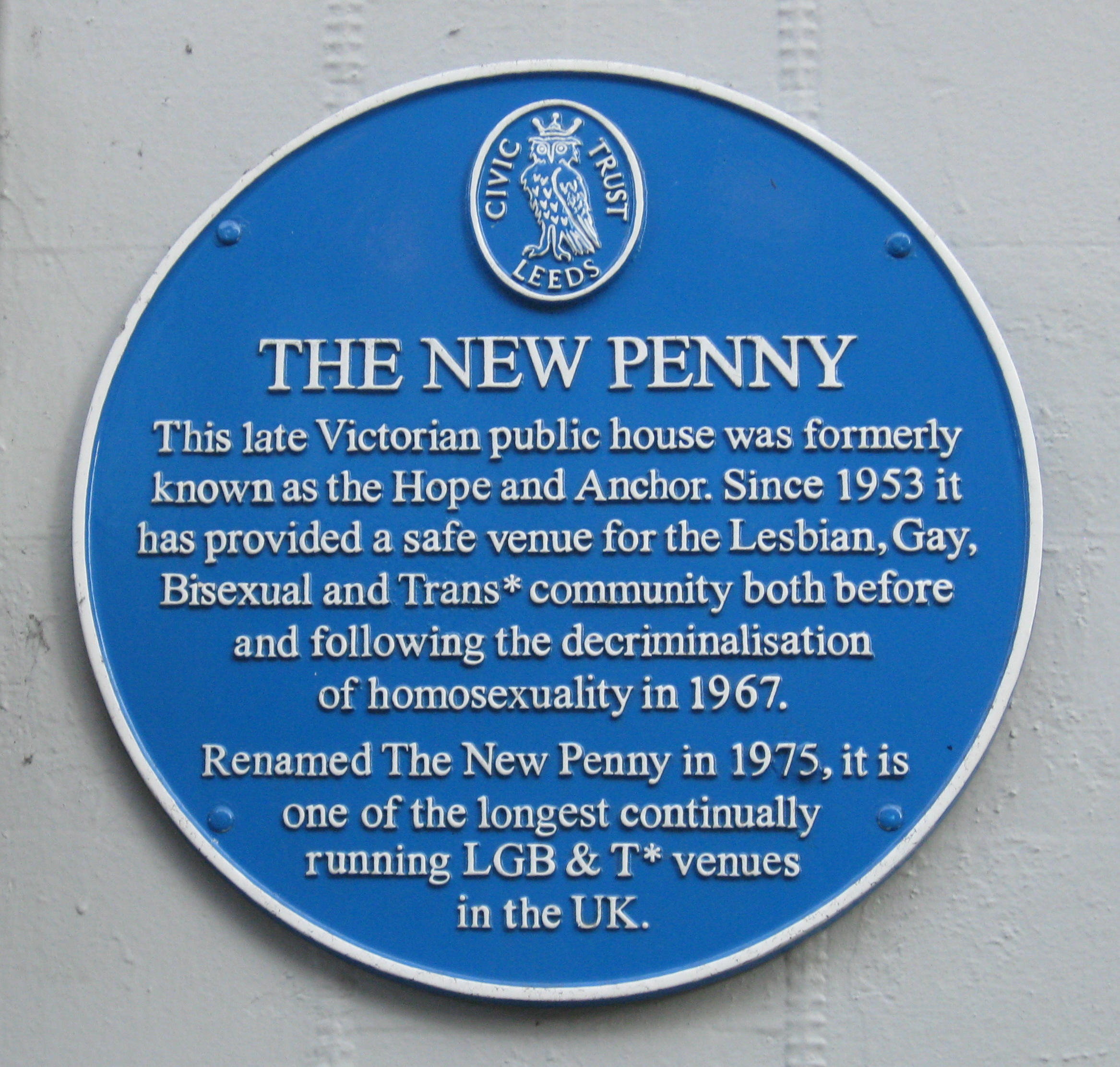
Blue plaque on the New Penny pub

There are many pubs and bars around the area. The pub The New Penny on Call Lane was awarded a blue plaque by Leeds Civic Trust on 19 October 2016, "for providing a safe venue for lesbian, gay, bisexual and transgender people." The plaque states that the pub is "one of the longest continually running LGB & T* venues in the UK, having been so since 1953". The area is also the setting for the post parade street party and stalls at Leeds Pride.
