= The New Penny =

Gay bar in Leeds, England

Coordinates: 53.794582°N 1.541720°W

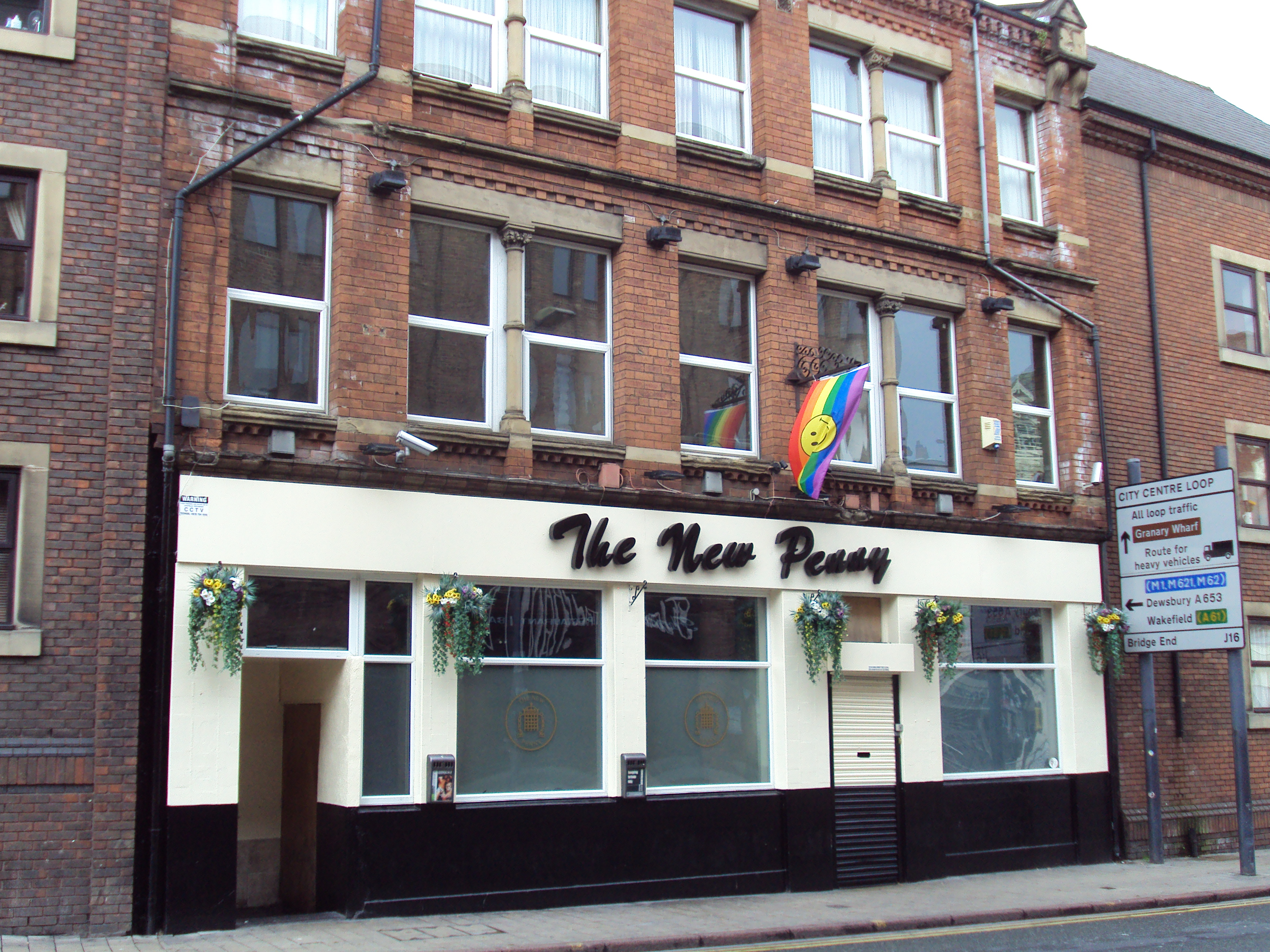
View of the New Penny from Call Lane in 2010

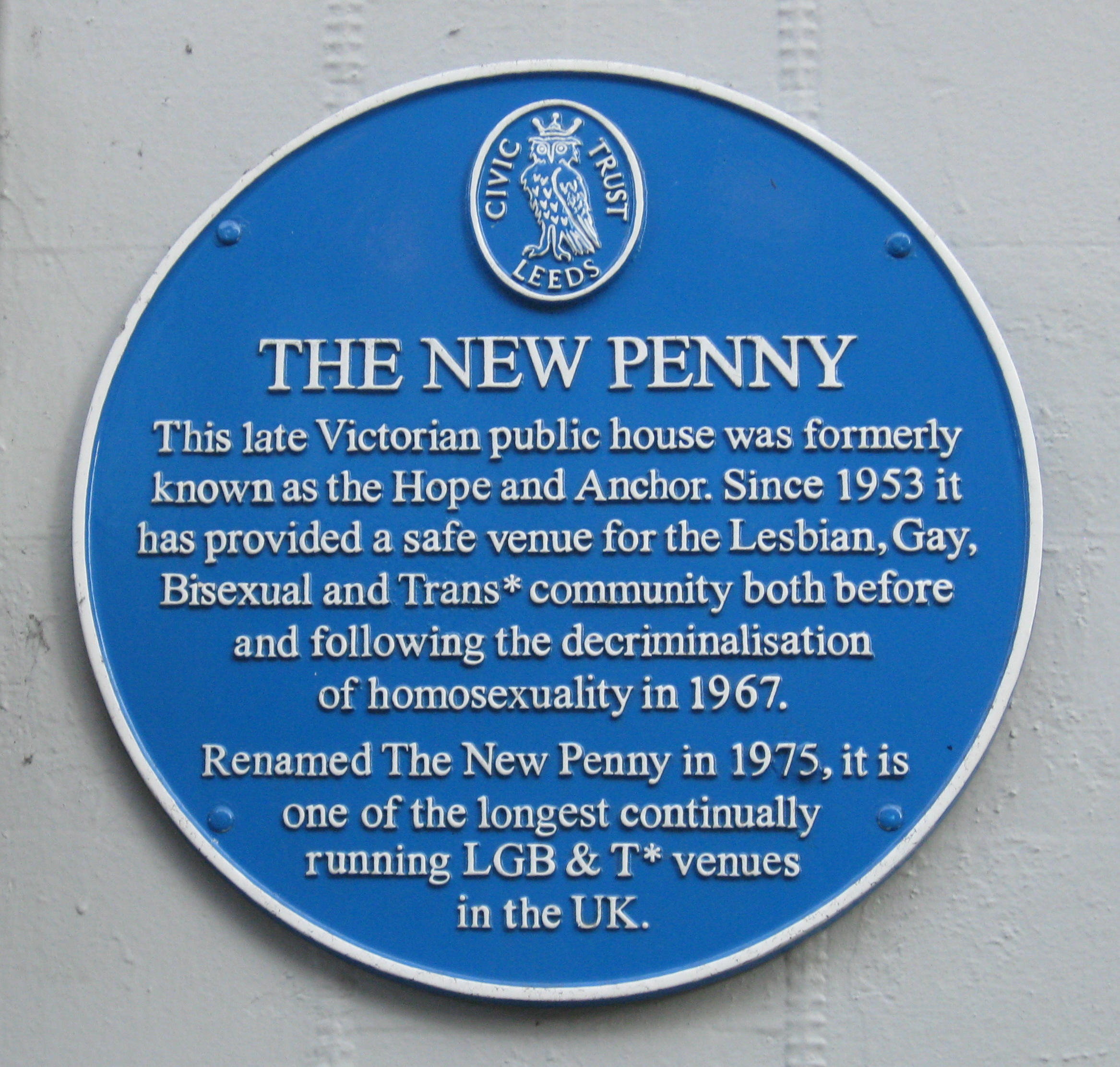
Leeds Civic Trust Blue Plaque

The New Penny is a gay pub in The Calls area of Leeds, West Yorkshire. It is reported to be the oldest continually running gay pub in the UK.

== History ==
The pub started as the Hope and Anchor in 1953. Although difficulty with the law meant it was a secretive place, it was the first gay venue to open outside London.

In March 1968, the Hope and Anchor was featured in an exposé-style article in the local Union News and possibly as a result of this article, the content of which was soon reprinted in a national newspaper, The People, the pub was targeted and "completely wrecked" by football fans following the Leeds United v. Glasgow Rangers match at Elland Road on 9 April 1968. A period of closure followed, and after a change of ownership it reopened as The New Penny.

The pub has hosted various well-known drag queens on its stage, including Lily Savage, Anna Glypta, Fats and Small, Sisters Slim, Amber Dextrous, Miss Orry, and Ricky Glass.

The New Penny is hosted 7 nights a week by resident drag queens such as Alexis Lilly, Franny, Ruby Boy & Miss Mindy Minigue - as well as Dj Lee Lee.

The New Penny is one of the most popular venues in Leeds, attracting a diverse crowd of gay and straight patrons. It regained its popularity when drinking laws were relaxed to allow a later licence, usually meaning it is the last venue to close its doors at weekends on the Leeds gay scene. It is also involved in the annual Leeds Pride event.

On 19 October 2016, Leeds Civic Trust awarded it a blue plaque "for providing a safe venue for lesbian, gay, bisexual and transgender people."

== See also ==
- List of LGBTQ bars
