= 42 The Calls =

Hotel in Leeds, West Yorkshire, England

42 The Calls Hotel
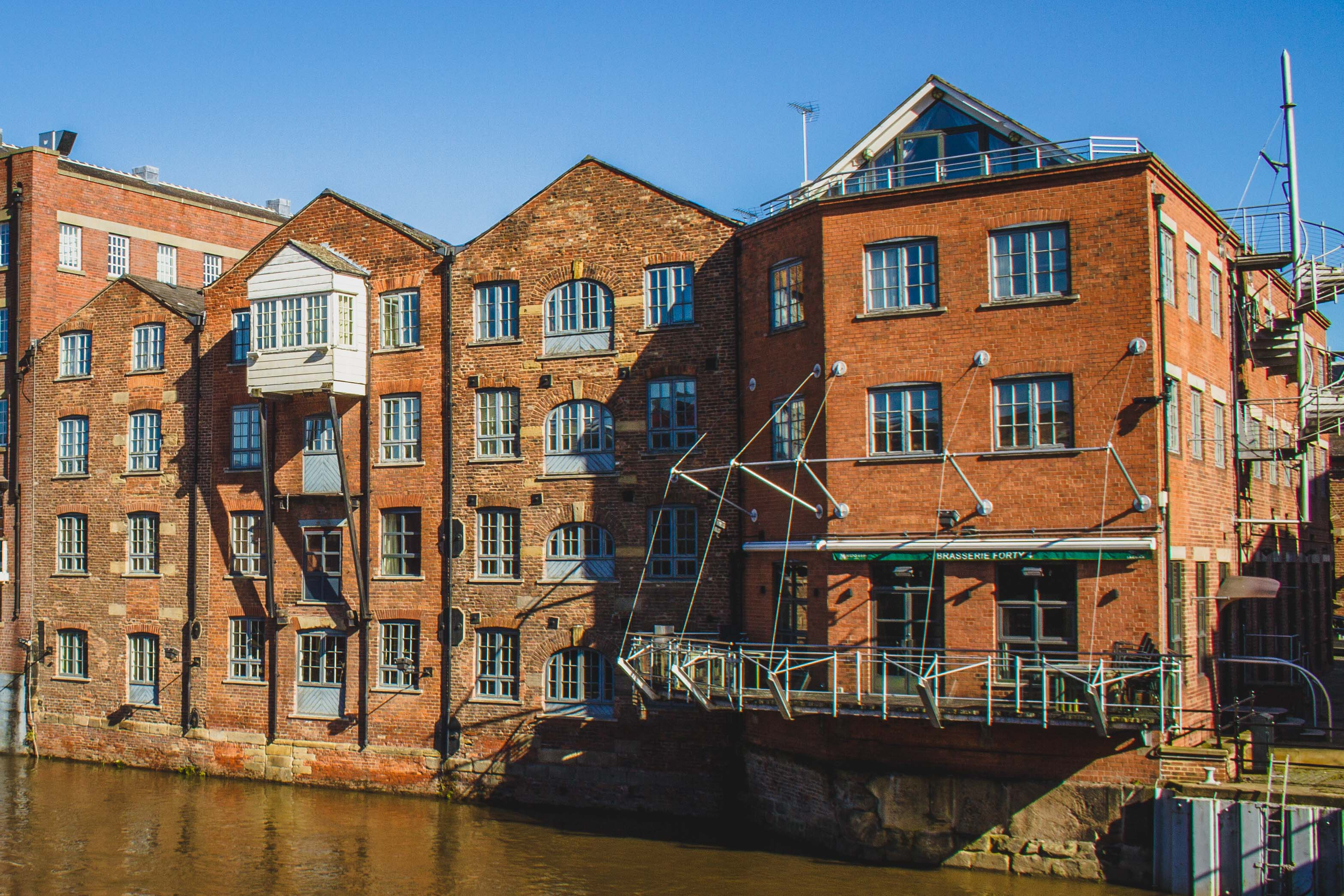
- A view of the back of 42 The Calls, taken from the River Aire.
- Interactive map of the 42 The Calls Hotel area

General information
- Location: 42 The Calls, Leeds, LS2 7EW, England
- Coordinates: 53°47′40.9″N 1°32′17.3″W
- Opening: 1991
- Owner: 42 The Calls Hotel Limited

Technical details
- Floor count: 6

Other information
- Number of rooms: 41

Website
- Official Website

42 The Calls Hotel is a Grade II listed 4-star boutique hotel with 41 rooms. The hotel is located on The Calls in Leeds opposite Leeds Parish Church and near to Leeds Corn Exchange. A former corn mill, the 18th century Fletland Mill was bought by hotelier Jonathan Wix in 1991 and renovated at a cost of £19.5 million.

In February 2018 the hotel entered liquidation, and RSM Restructuring Advisory LLP were appointed as liquidators of the company following a court order issued on 17 January 2018, and a petition by HMRC. The hotel was acquired by local investor Simon Pollard in April 2018. The hotel is planned to undergo refurbishment in Autumn 2019, but will remain open for bookings for the foreseeable future.

== Awards ==
The hotel has been awarded Condé Nast Traveller Best Business Hotel in the UK 2001 and 2002 and Which? Business Hotel of the Year 1999.

== Adjacent Features ==
The hotel is situated along the River Aire, adjacent to The Calls Landing. In between these two buildings, a silver ball fountain was installed to commemorate major regeneration carried out by Leeds Corporation between 1985 and 1995. This work was awarded a plaque for the Leeds Award for Architecture 1992, which is fixed to the exterior of 42 The Calls Hotel.

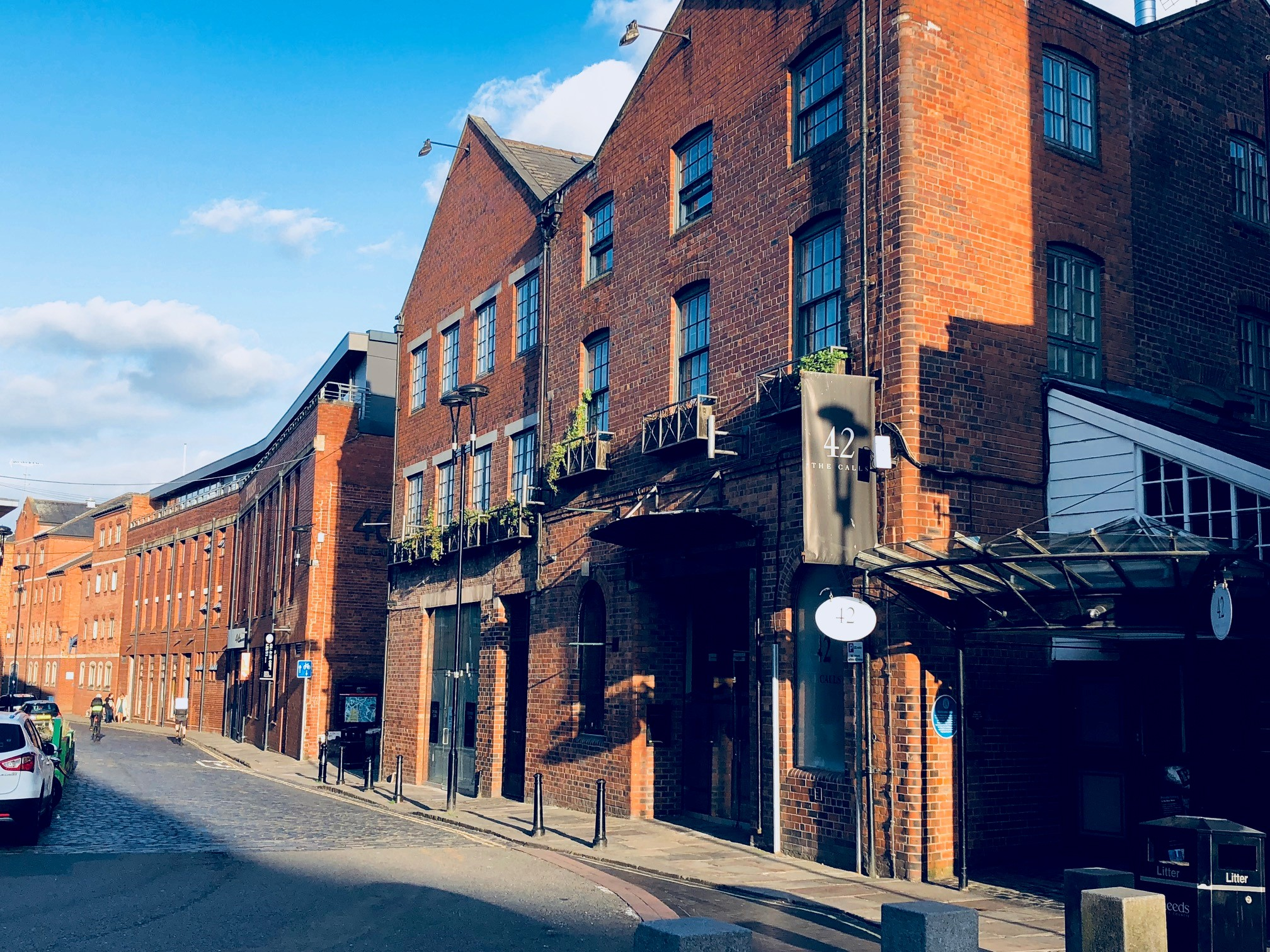
Front entrance to 42 The Calls Hotel

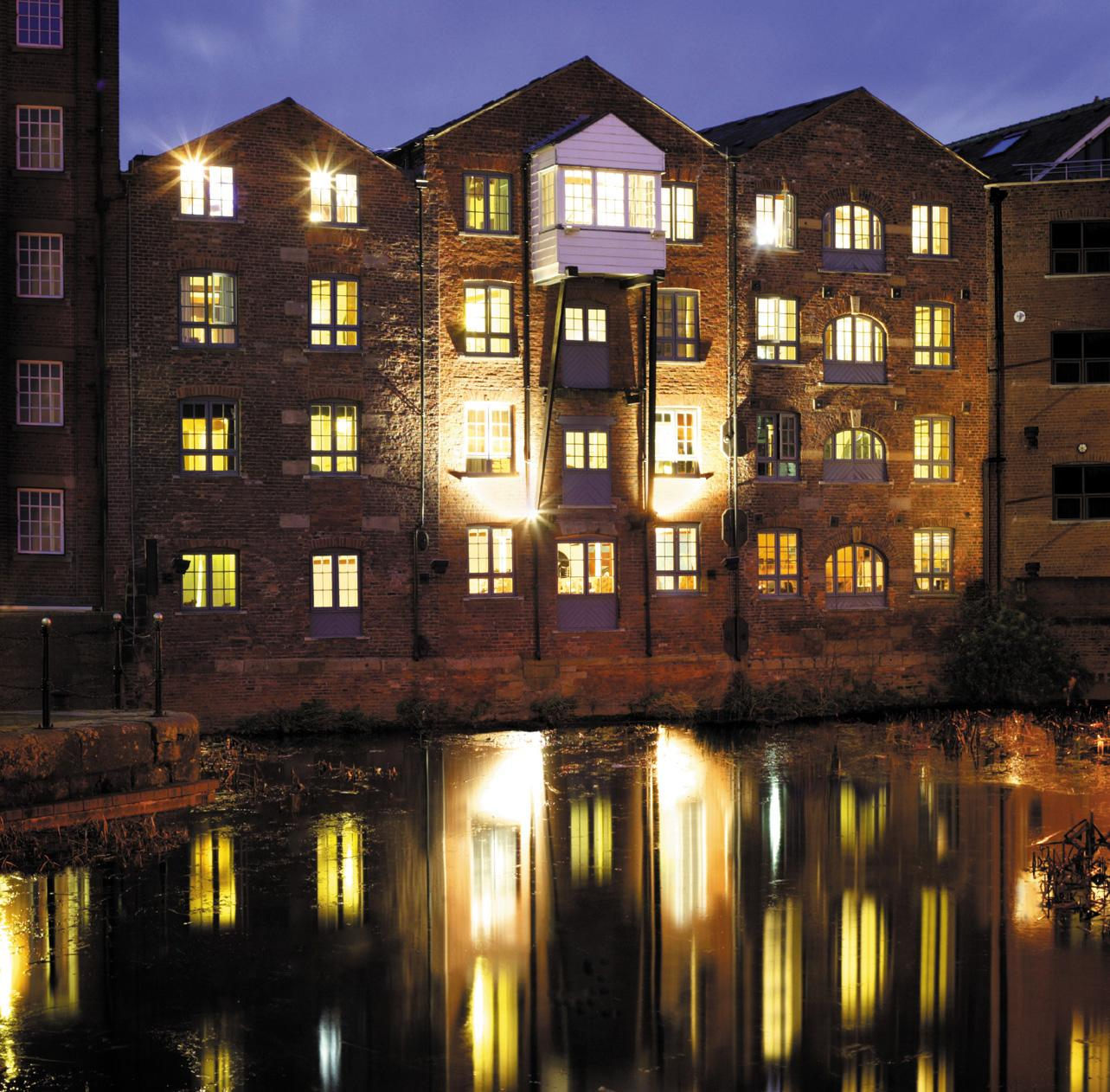
Rear view of 42 The Calls Hotel at night

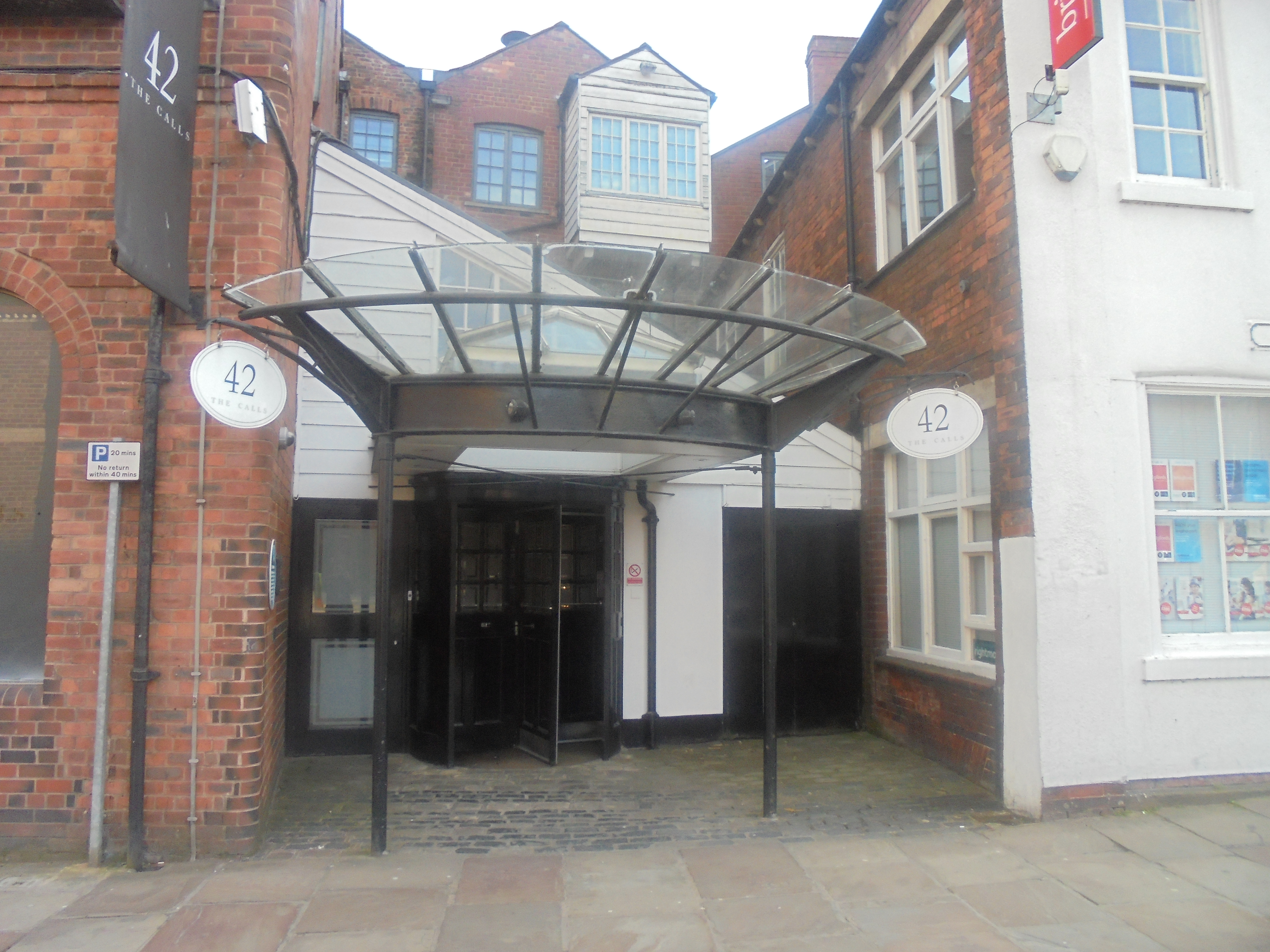
Front entrance to 42 The Calls Hotel

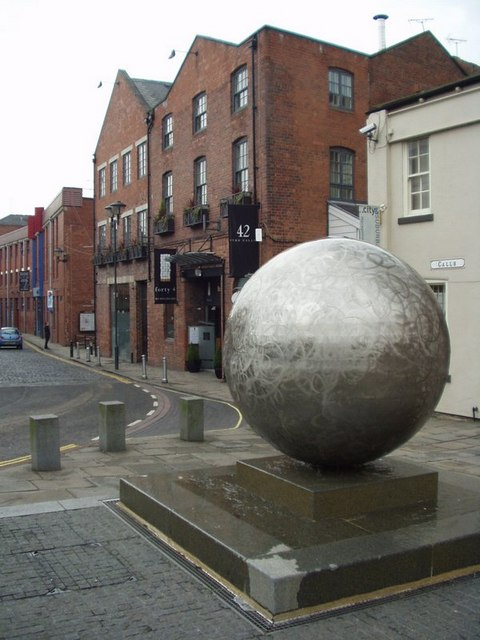
Silver ball fountain

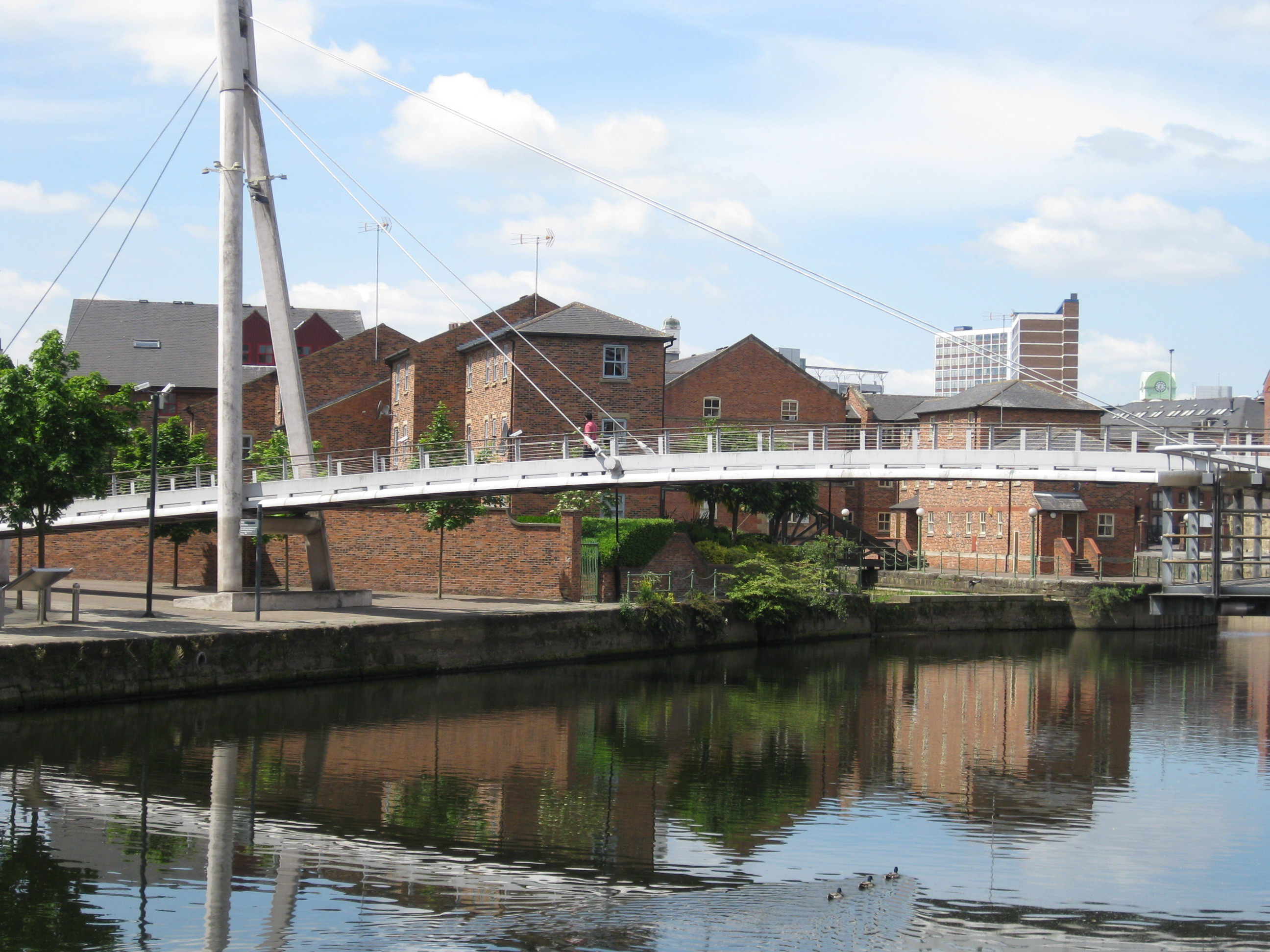
Centenary Footbridge

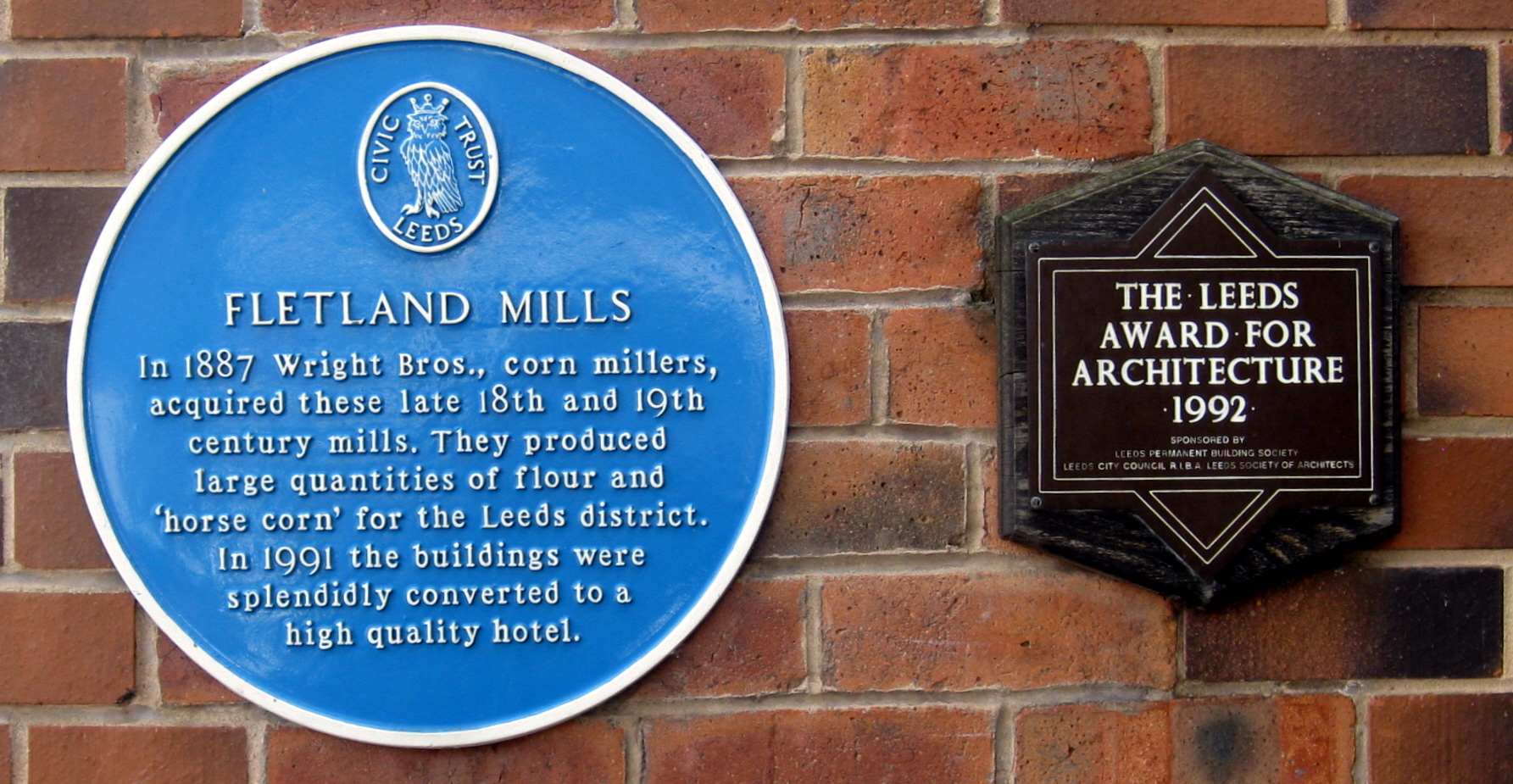
Civic Trust plaque and Leeds Award for Architecture on Fletland Mills
