= Leeds =

City in West Yorkshire, England

- City and metropolitan borough
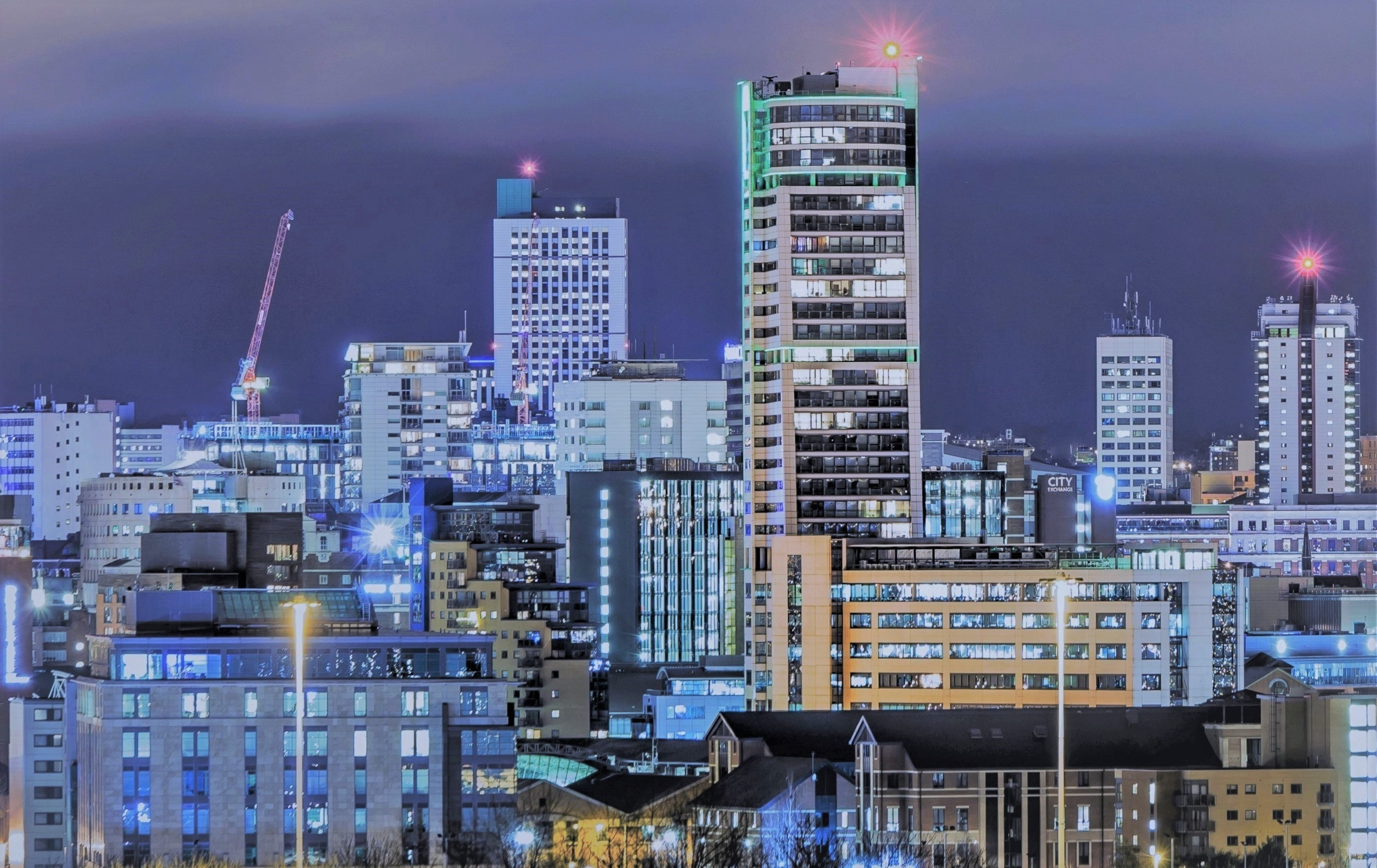
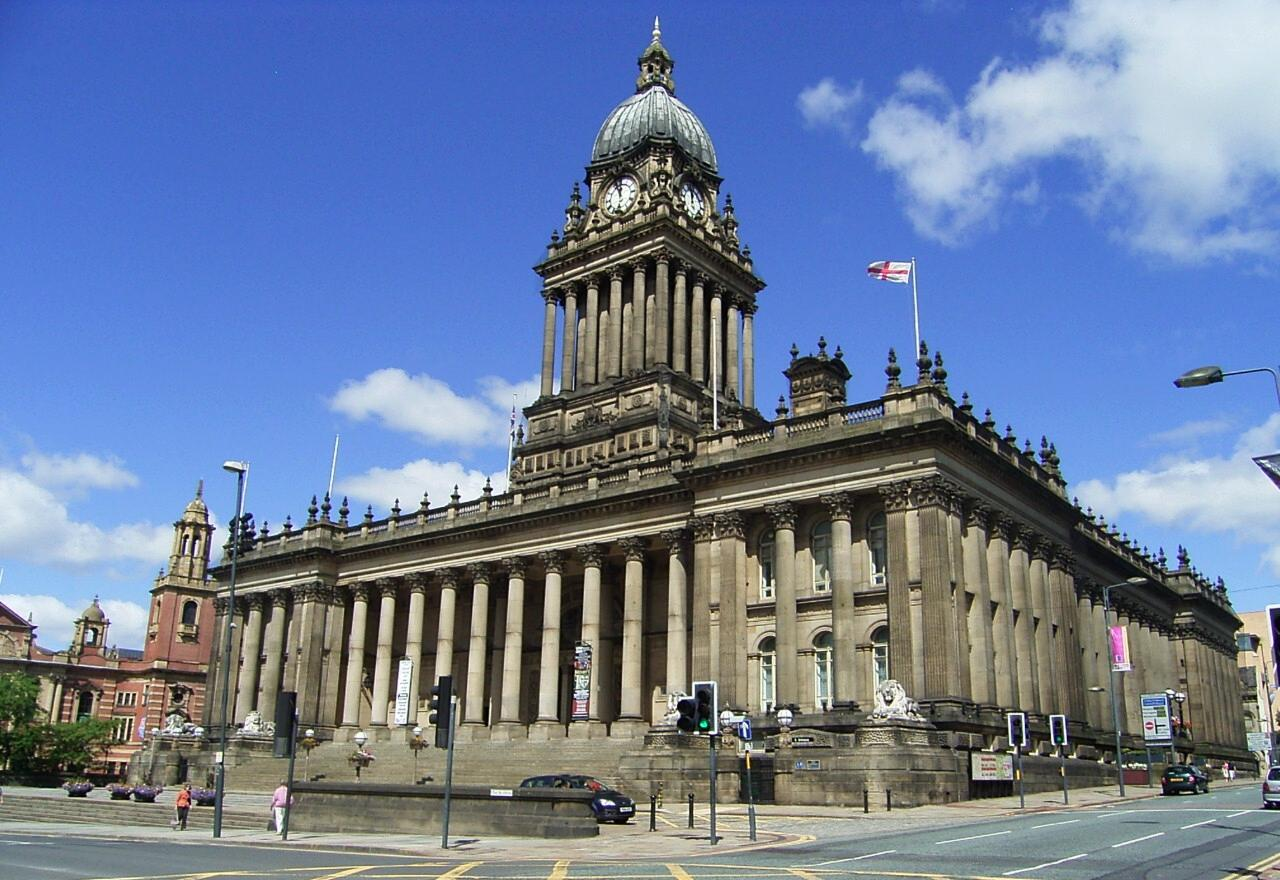
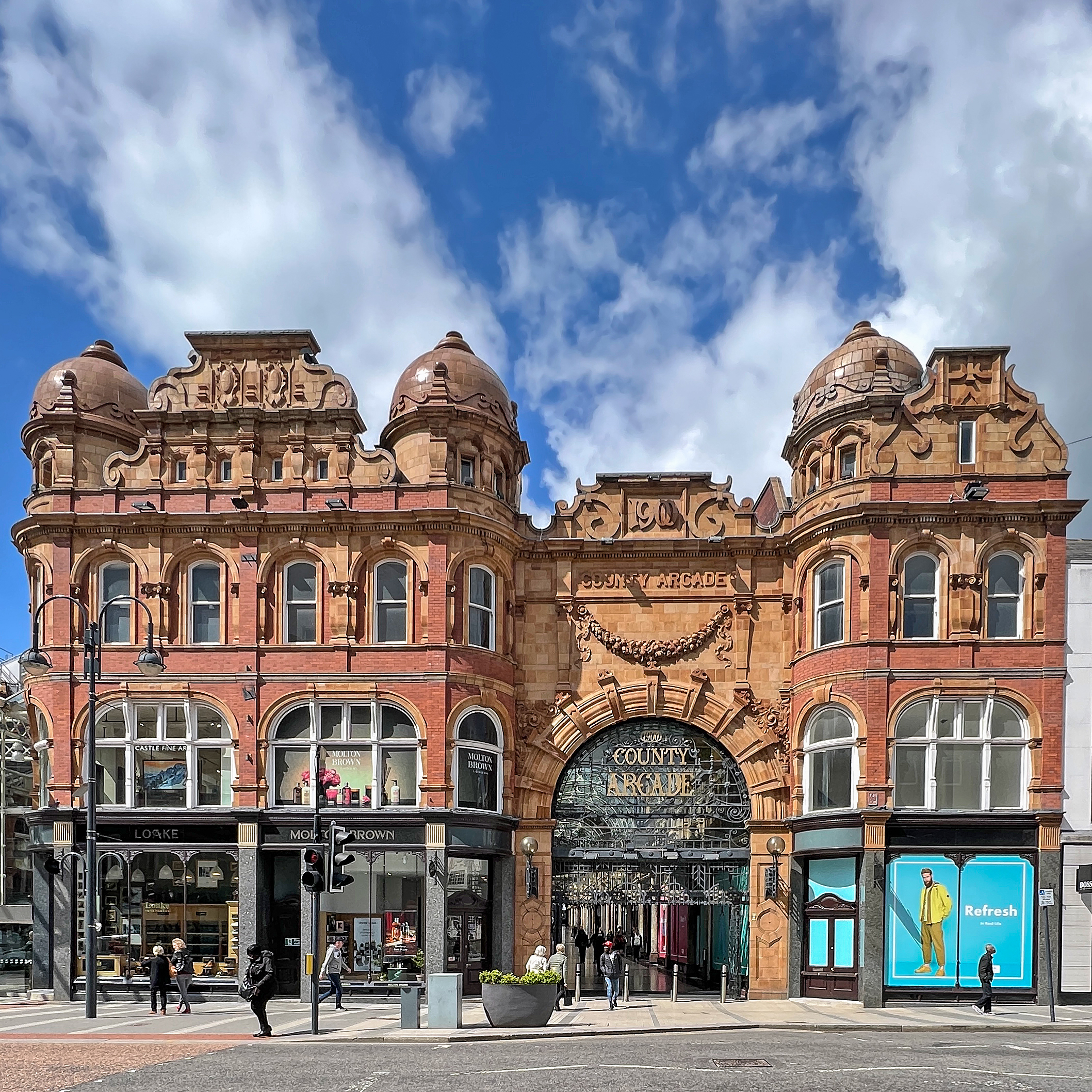
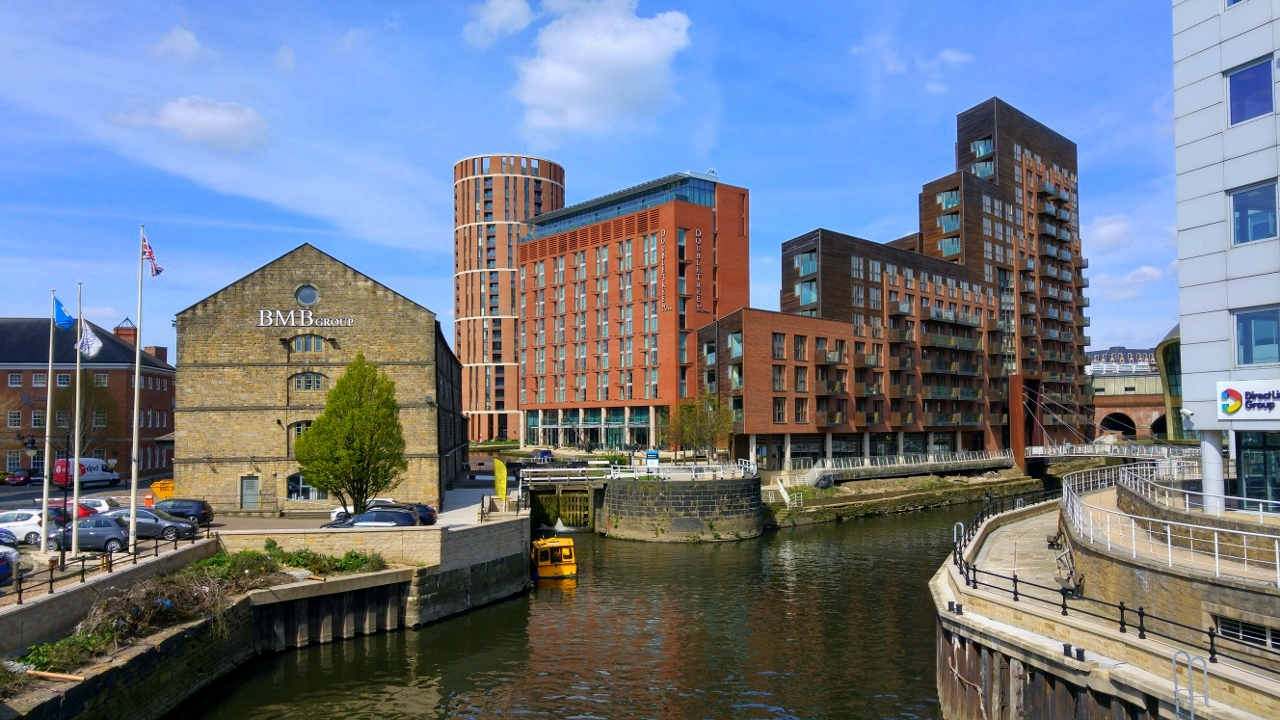
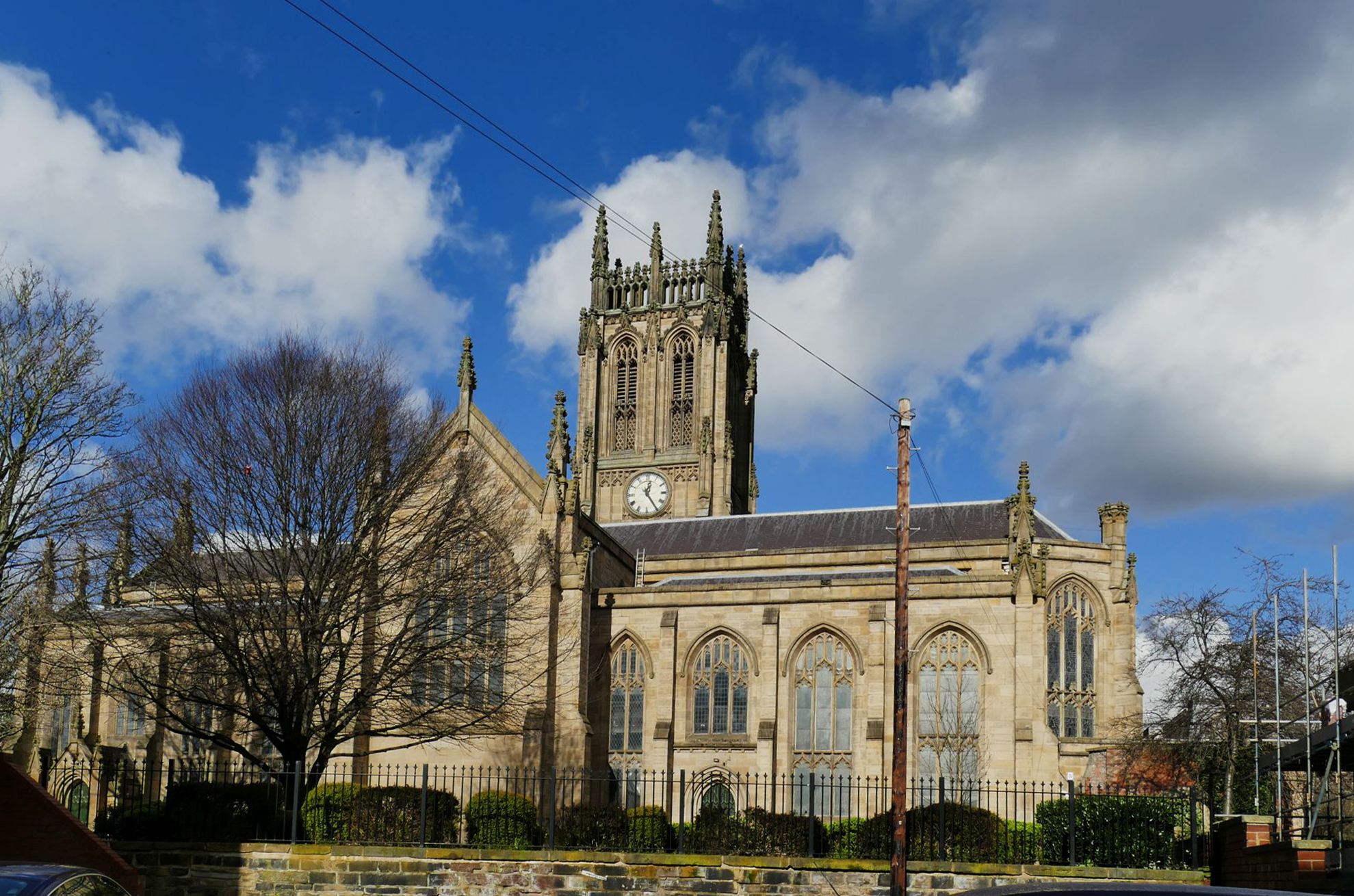
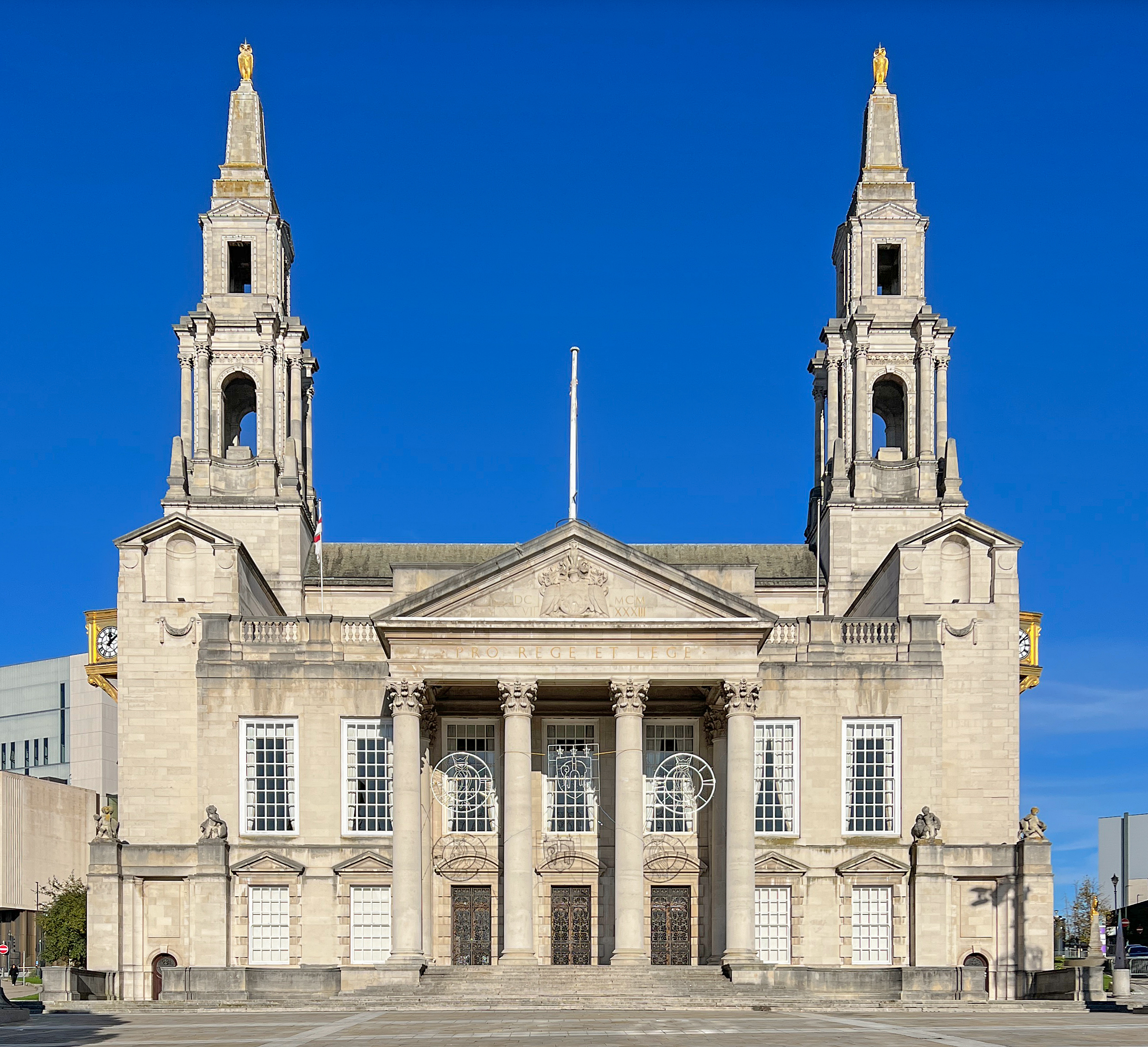
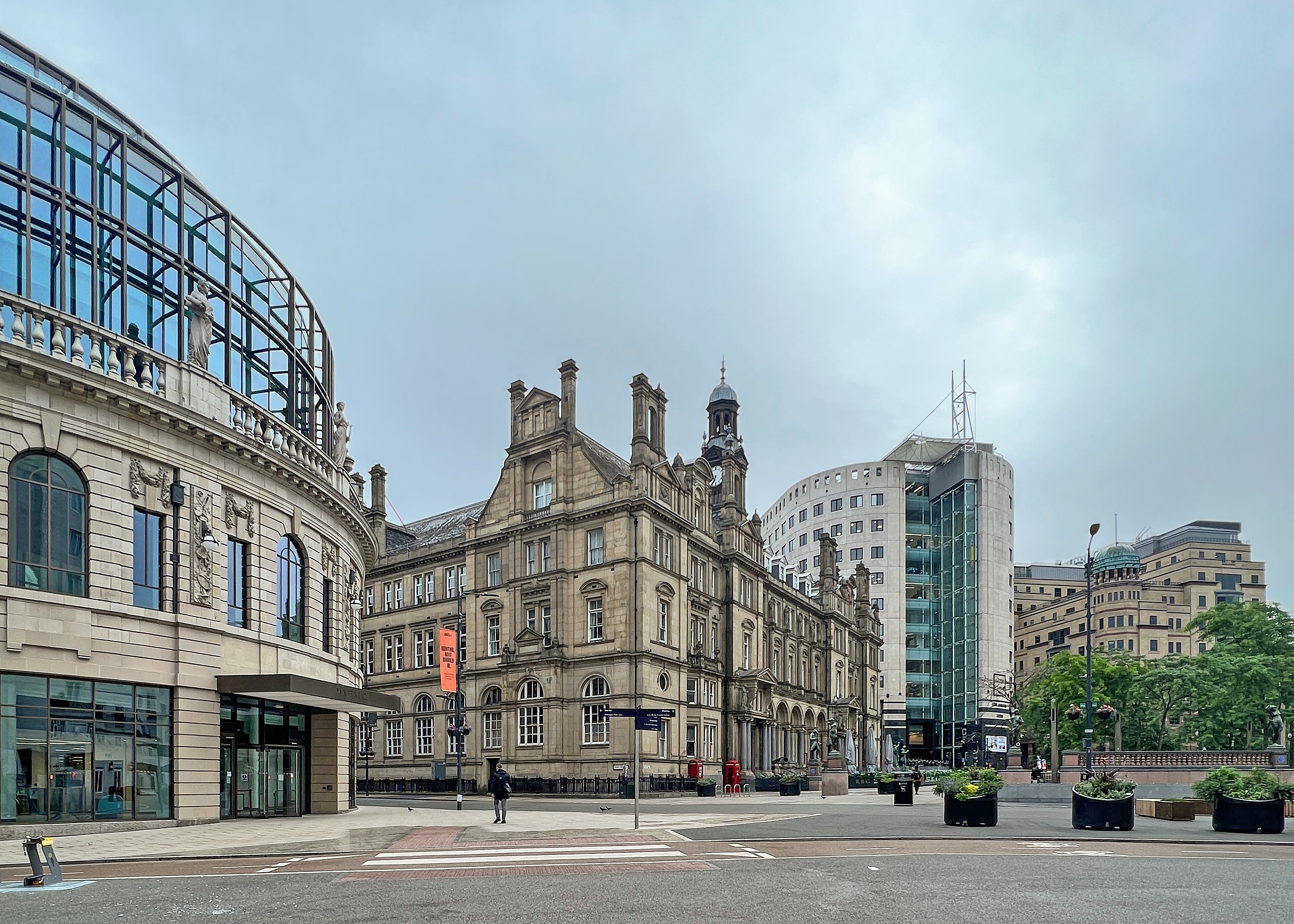
- Leeds city centre Town Hall County Arcade Granary Wharf Minster Civic Hall City Square

- Coat of arms

- Location within City of Leeds Location within West Yorkshire
- Area: 111.6 km^{2} (43.1 sq mi)
- Population: 536,280 (2021 estimate; ONS)
  - Density: 4,805/km^{2} (12,440/sq mi)
- Demonym: Loiner, Leodensian
- OS grid reference: SE299339
- Metropolitan borough: Leeds
- Metropolitan county: West Yorkshire
- Region: Yorkshire and the Humber
- Country: England
- Sovereign state: United Kingdom
- Areas of the city: List: Adel; Alwoodley; Armley; Beeston; Belle Isle; Black Moor; Bramley; Burley; Chapel Allerton; Chapeltown; Churwell; City Centre; Colton; Cookridge; Cross Gates; Far Headingley; Gamble Hill; Gipton; Gledhow; Halton; Harehills; Hawksworth; Headingley; Hunslet; Hyde Park; Killingbeck; Kirkstall; Knowsthorpe; Lawnswood; Leeds Dock; Little London; Manston; Middleton; Moor Allerton; Moorside; Moortown; New Farnley; Oakwood; Osmondthorpe; Pendas Fields; Rodley; Roundhay; Seacroft; Sheepscar; Stourton; The Calls; West Park; Wortley
- Post town: LEEDS
- Postcode district: LS1-20, LS25-27
- Dialling code: 0113
- Police: West Yorkshire
- Fire: West Yorkshire
- Ambulance: Yorkshire
- UK Parliament: Leeds Central and Headingley; Leeds East; Leeds North East; Leeds North West; Leeds South; Leeds South West and Morley; Leeds West and Pudsey; Selby; Wakefield and Rothwell Wetherby and Easingwold
- Website: leeds.gov.uk

Leeds is a city (Note: The area that is the subject of this article does not have legal city status itself, but is widely regarded as a city since it is the main and nominate settlement in the City of Leeds local government area) in West Yorkshire, England. It is the largest settlement in Yorkshire and the administrative centre of the City of Leeds Metropolitan Borough, which is the second most populous district in the United Kingdom. It is built around the River Aire and is in the eastern foothills of the Pennines. The city was a small manorial borough in the 13th century and a market town in the 16th century. Leeds expanded in the 17th and 18th centuries by becoming a major production and trading centre (mainly with wool). It was awarded a city charter in 1893 by Queen Victoria.

Leeds developed as a mill town during the Industrial Revolution alongside other surrounding villages and towns in the West Riding of Yorkshire. It was also known for its flax industry, iron foundries, engineering and printing, as well as shopping, with several surviving Victorian era arcades, such as Kirkgate Market. City status was awarded in 1893, and a populous urban centre formed in the following century which absorbed surrounding villages and overtook the population of nearby York.

The economy of Leeds is the most diverse of all the UK's main employment centres, has seen the fastest rate of private-sector jobs growth of any UK city and has the highest ratio of private to public sector jobs. Leeds is home to over 109,000 companies, generating 5% of England's total economic output, at £60.5 billion, and is also ranked as a high sufficiency city by the Globalization and World Cities Research Network. Leeds is considered the cultural, financial and commercial heart of the West Yorkshire Urban Area.

Leeds is also served by five universities, and has the fourth largest student population in the country and the country's fourth largest urban economy. The student population has stimulated growth of the nightlife in the city and there are ample facilities for sporting and cultural activities, including classical and popular music festivals, and a varied collection of museums. The city is home to the Leeds United football club.

Leeds has multiple motorway links such as the M1, M62 and A1(M). The city's railway station is, alongside Manchester Piccadilly, the busiest of its kind in Northern England. Public transport, rail and road networks in the city and wider region are widespread. It is the county's largest settlement, with a population of 536,280, while the larger City of Leeds district has a population of 812,000 (2021 census). The city is part of the fourth-largest built-up area by population in the United Kingdom, West Yorkshire Built-up Area, with a 2011 census population of 1.7 million.

== Toponymy ==
The name derives from the old Brittonic *Lātēnses (via Late Brittonic Lādēses), composed of the Celtic root *lāt- "violent, boiling" and the borrowed Latin plural derivational suffix -ēnses, meaning "people of the fast-flowing river", in reference to the River Aire that flows through the city. This name originally referred to the forested area covering most of the Brittonic kingdom of Elmet, which existed during the 5th century into the early 7th century.

Bede states in the fourteenth chapter of his Ecclesiastical History, in a discussion of an altar surviving from a church erected by Edwin of Northumbria, that it is located in ...regione quae vocatur Loidis (Latin, "the region which is called Loidis"). An inhabitant of Leeds is locally known as a Loiner, a word of uncertain origin. The term Leodensian is also used, from the city's Latin name.

== History ==
=== Economic development ===
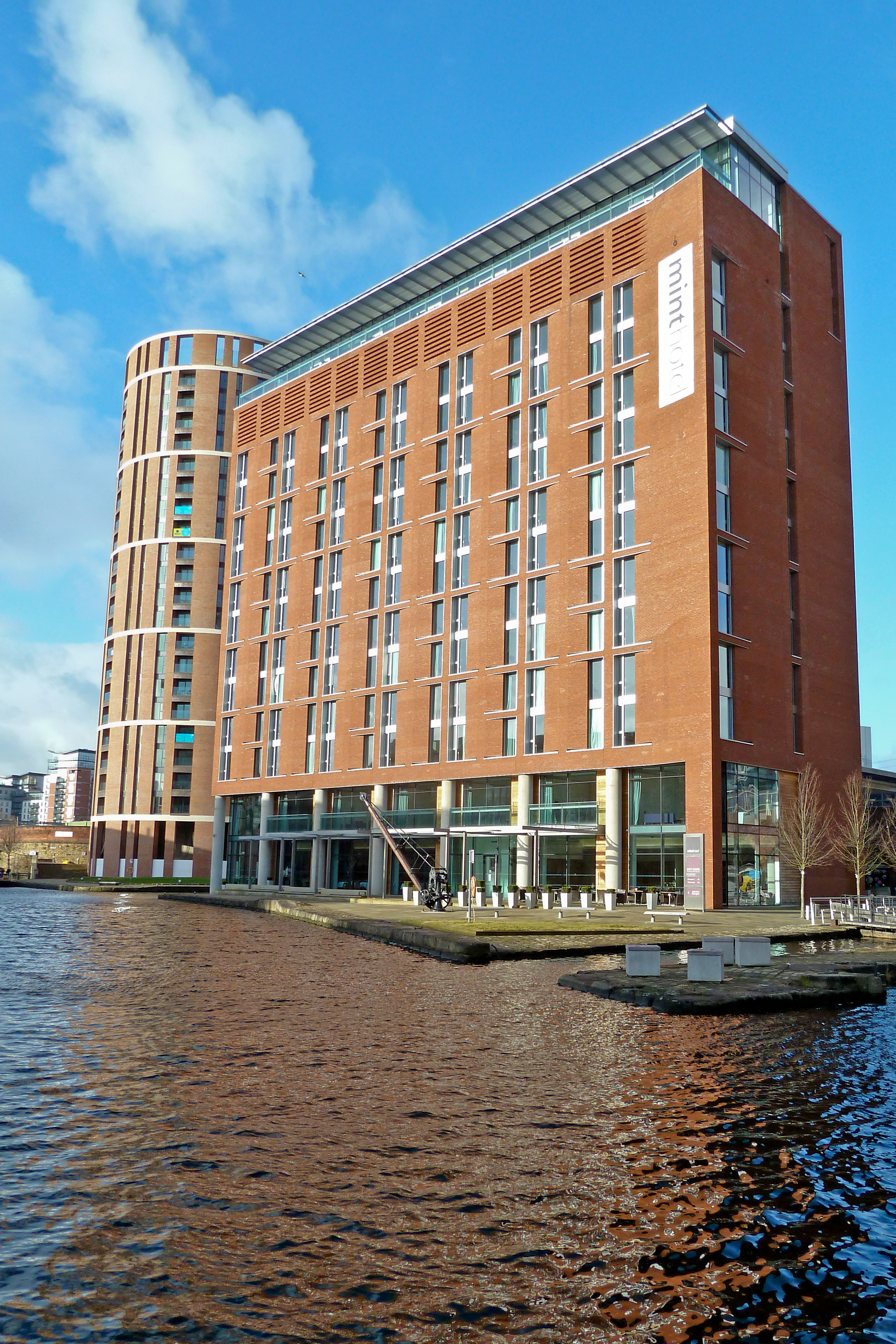
The Leeds and Liverpool Canal at Granary Wharf

The Leeds Corn Exchange, opened in 1864.

Leeds developed as a market town in the Middle Ages, as part of the local agricultural economy.

Before the Industrial Revolution, it became a co-ordination centre for the manufacture of woollen cloth, and white broadcloth was traded at its White Cloth Hall. Leeds handled one-sixth of England's export trade in 1770. Growth, initially in textiles, was accelerated by the creation of the Aire and Calder Navigation in 1699 (with major additional works in the 18th century), and the Leeds and Liverpool Canal in 1816. In the late Georgian era, William Lupton was one of a number of central Leeds landowners, some of whom, like him, were also textile manufacturers. At the time of his death in 1828, Lupton occupied the enclosed fields of the manor of Leeds, his estate including a mill, reservoir, substantial house and outbuildings.

Mechanical engineering, initially supplying tools and machinery for the textile sector, rapidly became a diverse industry.

The railway network constructed around Leeds, starting with the Leeds and Selby Railway in 1834, provided improved communications with national markets and, significantly for its development, an east–west connection with Manchester and the ports of Liverpool and Hull giving improved access to international markets. Alongside technological advances and industrial expansion, Leeds retained an interest in trading in agricultural commodities, with the Corn Exchange opening in 1864.

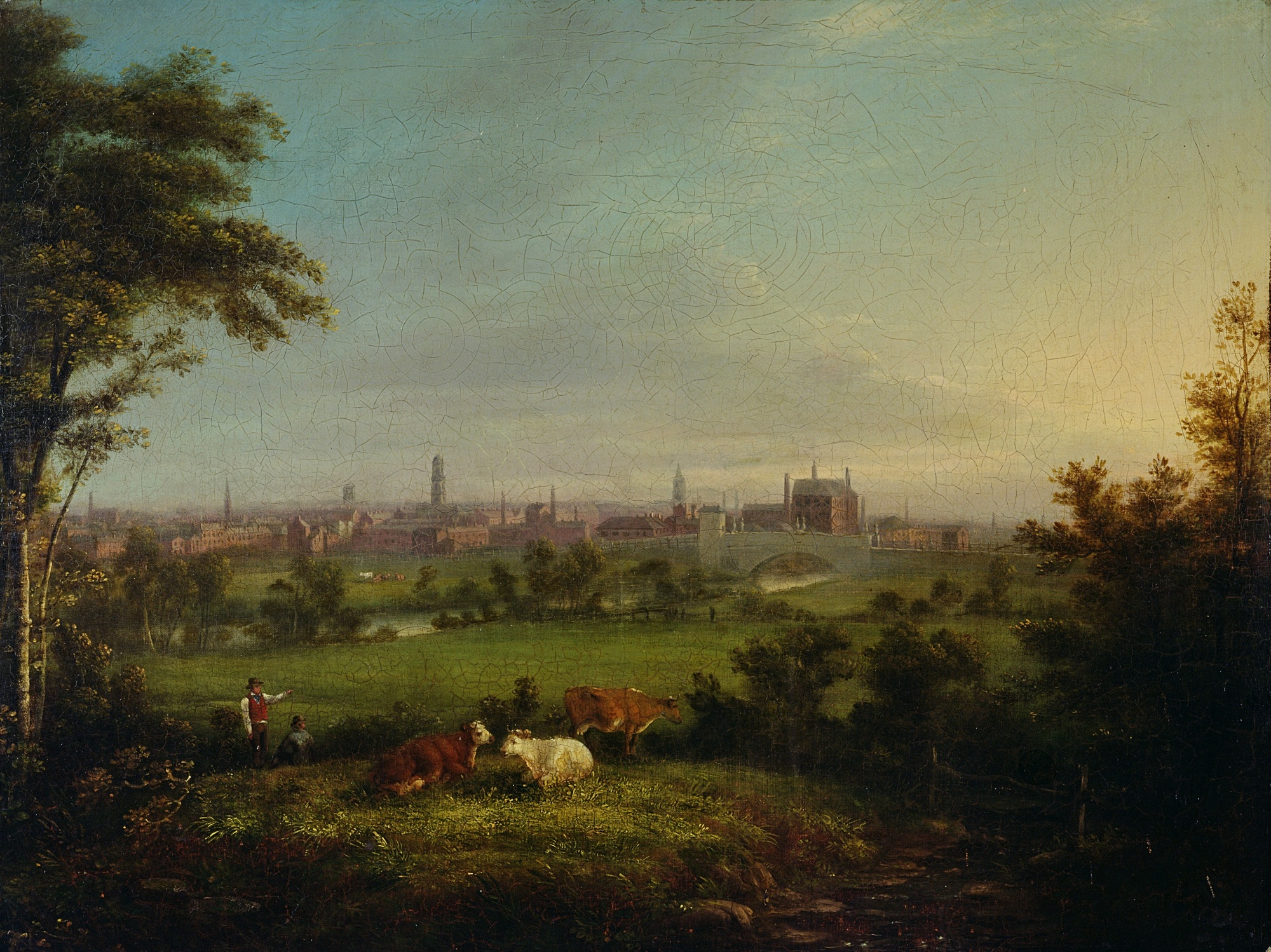
Leeds from the Meadows by Joseph Rhodes, 1825

Marshall's Mill was one of the first of many factories constructed in Leeds from around 1790 when the most significant were woollen finishing and flax mills. Manufacturing diversified by 1914 towards printing, engineering, chemicals and clothing manufacture. Decline in manufacturing during the 1930s was temporarily reversed by a switch to producing military uniforms and munitions during the Second World War. However, by the 1970s, the clothing industry was in irreversible decline, facing cheap foreign competition. The contemporary economy has been shaped by Leeds City Council's vision of building a '24-hour European city' and 'capital of the north', but modern forms of manufacturing still feature within the City Council's vision for the city's future. The city has developed from the decay of the post-industrial era to become a telephone banking centre, connected to the electronic infrastructure of the modern global economy. There has been growth in the corporate and legal sectors, and increased local affluence has led to an expanding retail sector, including the luxury goods market.

Leeds City Region Enterprise Zone was launched in April 2012 to promote development in four sites along the A63 East Leeds Link Road.

=== Local government ===
Leeds (parish) population
1881	160,109
1891	177,523
1901	177,920
1911	259,394
1921	269,665
1931	482,809
1941	No census due to war
1951	505,219
1961	510,676
Source: UK census

Leeds was a manor and township in the large ancient parish of Leeds St Peter, in the Skyrack wapentake of the West Riding of Yorkshire. The Borough of Leeds was created in 1207, when Maurice Paynel, lord of the manor, granted a charter to a small area of the manor, close to the river crossing, in what is now the city centre. King James I granted the borough to his wife, Anne of Denmark, and in 1612, she ordered a survey of the borough; in 1615 she was petitioned to remove the strict Calvinist preacher Alexander Cooke as vicar of Leeds, but she refused.

The inhabitants petitioned Charles I for a charter of incorporation, which was granted in 1626. The new charter incorporated the entire parish, including all eleven townships, as the Borough of Leeds and withdrew the earlier charter. Improvement commissioners were set up in 1755 for paving, lighting, and cleansing of the main streets, including Briggate and further powers were added in 1790 to improve the water supply.

The borough corporation was reformed under the provisions of Municipal Corporations Act 1835. Leeds Borough Police force was formed in 1836, and Leeds Town Hall was completed by the corporation in 1858. In 1866, Leeds and each of the other townships in the borough became civil parishes. The borough became a county borough in 1889, giving it independence from the newly formed West Riding County Council and it gained city status in 1893. In 1904 the Leeds parish absorbed Beeston, Chapel Allerton, Farnley, Headingley cum Burley and Potternewton from within the borough. In the twentieth century the county borough initiated a series of significant territorial expansions, growing from 21,593 acres (87.38 km^{2}) in 1911 to 40,612 acres (164.35 km^{2}) in 1961. In 1912 the parish and county borough of Leeds absorbed Leeds Rural District, consisting of the parishes of Roundhay and Seacroft; and Shadwell, which had been part of Wetherby Rural District. On 1 April 1925, the parish of Leeds was expanded to cover the whole borough.

The county borough was abolished on 1 April 1974, and its former area was combined with that of the municipal boroughs of Morley and Pudsey; the urban districts of Aireborough, Horsforth, Otley, Garforth and Rothwell; and parts of the rural districts of Tadcaster, Wetherby, and Wharfedale. This area formed a metropolitan district in the county of West Yorkshire. It gained both borough and city status and is known as the City of Leeds. Initially, local government services were provided by Leeds City Council and West Yorkshire County Council. When the county council was abolished in 1986, the city council absorbed its functions, and some powers passed to organisations such as the West Yorkshire Passenger Transport Authority. From 1988 two run-down and derelict areas close to the city centre were designated for regeneration and became the responsibility of Leeds Development Corporation, outside the planning remit of the city council. Planning powers were restored to the local authority in 1995 when the development corporation was wound up.

Leeds City Council are working with partners across the city to celebrate the four hundredth anniversary of its Royal Charter in 2026.

=== Suburban growth ===
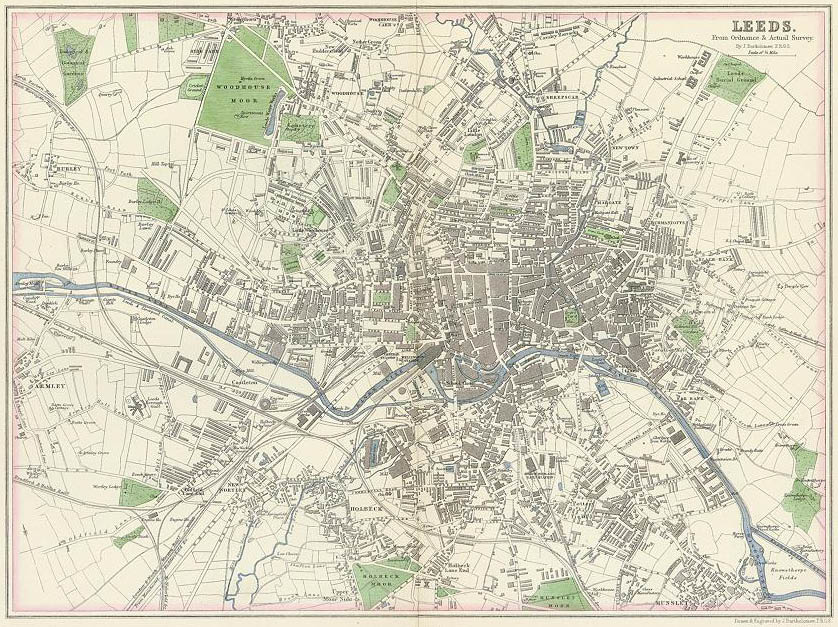
1866 map of Leeds

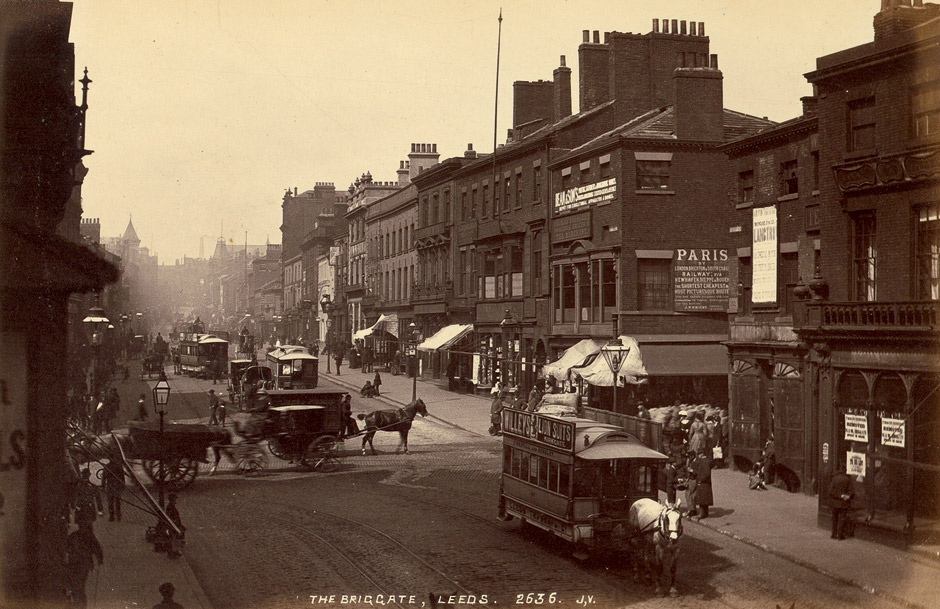
19th-century Briggate, Leeds

In 1801, 42% of the population of Leeds lived outside the township, in the wider borough. Cholera outbreaks in 1832 and 1849 caused the authorities to address the problems of drainage, sanitation, and water supply. Water was pumped from the River Wharfe, but by 1860 it was too heavily polluted to be usable. Following the Leeds Waterworks Act 1867 (30 & 31 Vict. c. cxli) three reservoirs were built at Lindley Wood, Swinsty, and Fewston in the Washburn Valley north of Leeds.

Residential growth occurred in Holbeck and Hunslet from 1801 to 1851, but, as these townships became industrialised new areas were favoured for middle class housing. Land south of the river was developed primarily for industry and secondarily for back-to-back workers' dwellings. The Leeds Improvement Act 1866 (29 & 30 Vict. c. clvii) sought to improve the quality of working class housing by restricting the number of homes that could be built in a single terrace.

Holbeck and Leeds formed a continuous built-up area by 1858, with Hunslet nearly meeting them. In the latter half of the nineteenth century, population growth in Hunslet, Armley, and Wortley outstripped that of Leeds. When pollution became a problem, the wealthier residents left the industrial conurbation to live in Headingley, Potternewton and Chapel Allerton which led to a 50% increase in the population of Headingley and Burley from 1851 to 1861. The middle-class flight from the industrial areas led to development beyond the borough at Roundhay and Adel. The introduction of the electric tramway led to intensification of development in Headingley and Potternewton and expansion outside the borough into Roundhay.

Two private gas supply companies were taken over by the corporation in 1870, and the municipal supply provided street lighting and cheaper gas to homes. From the early 1880s, the Yorkshire House-to-House Electricity Company supplied electricity to Leeds until it was purchased by Leeds Corporation and became a municipal supply.

Slum clearance and rebuilding began in Leeds during the interwar period when over 18,000 houses were built by the council on 24 estates in Cross Gates, Middleton, Gipton, Belle Isle and Halton Moor. The slums of Quarry Hill were replaced by the innovative Quarry Hill flats, which were demolished in 1975. Another 36,000 houses were built by private sector builders, creating suburbs in Gledhow, Moortown, Alwoodley, Roundhay, Colton, Whitkirk, Oakwood, Weetwood, and Adel. After 1949 a further 30,000 sub-standard houses were demolished by the council and replaced by 151 medium-rise and high-rise blocks of council flats in estates at Seacroft, Armley Heights, Tinshill, and Brackenwood. Leeds has seen great expenditure on regenerating the city, attracting in investments and flagship projects, as found in Leeds city centre. Many developments boasting luxurious penthouse apartments have been built close to the city centre.

== Geography ==
At 53°47′59″N 1°32′57″W (53.799°, −1.549°), and 190 miles (310 km) north-northwest of central London, central Leeds is located on the River Aire in a narrow section of the Aire Valley in the eastern foothills of the Pennines. The city centre lies at about 206 feet (63 m) above sea level while the district ranges from 1,115 feet (340 m) in the far west on the slopes of Ilkley Moor to about 33 feet (10 m) where the rivers Aire and Wharfe cross the eastern boundary. The centre of Leeds is part of a continuously built-up area extending to Pudsey, Bramley, Horsforth, Alwoodley, Seacroft, Middleton and Morley.

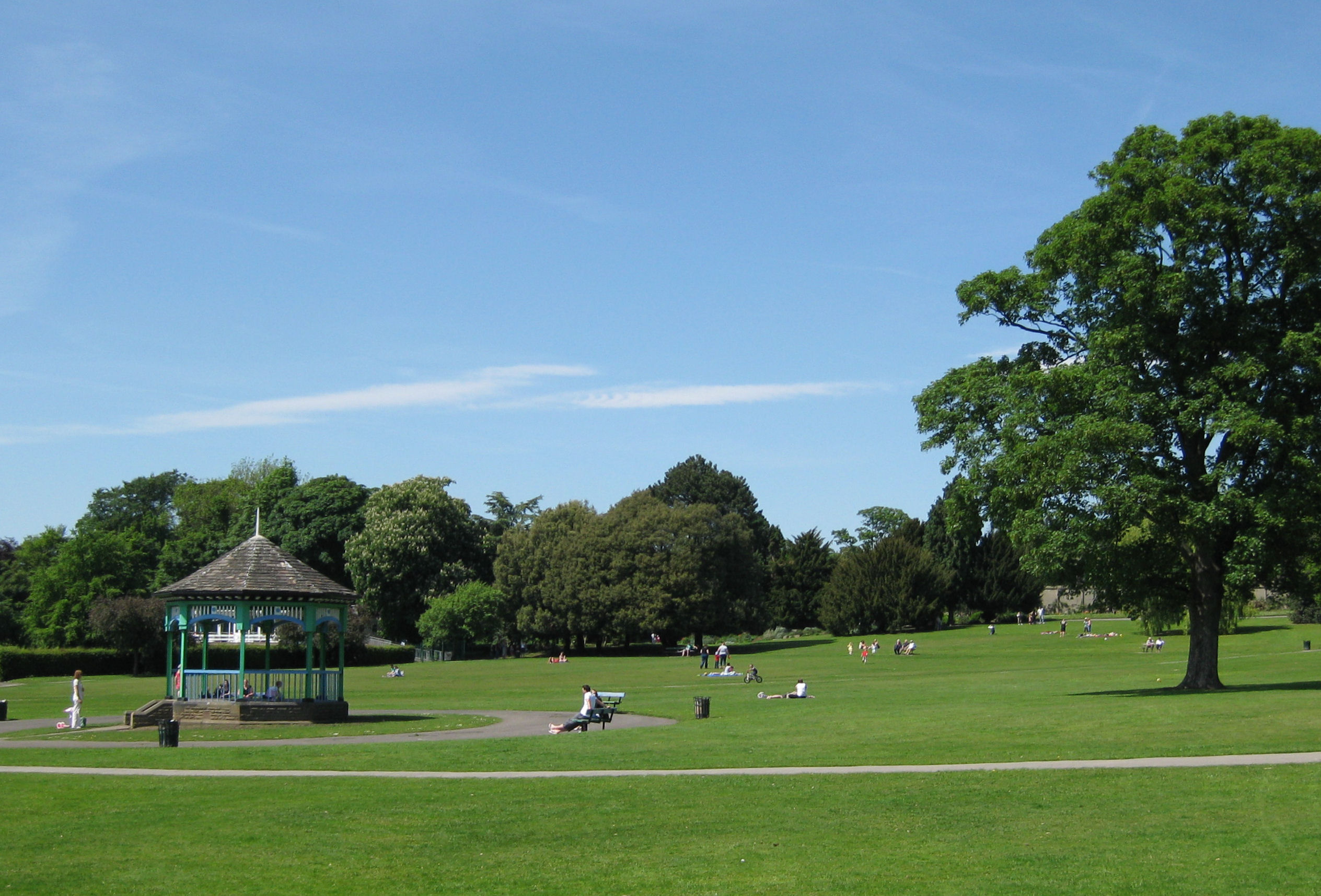
Leeds is home to many large urban parks.

Leeds has the second highest population of any local authority district in the UK (after Birmingham), and the second greatest area of any English metropolitan district (after Doncaster), extending 15 miles (24 km) from east to west, and 13 miles (21 km) from north to south. The northern boundary follows the River Wharfe for several miles but crosses the river to include the part of Otley which lies north of the river. Over 60% of the Leeds district is green belt land and the city centre is less than twenty miles (32 km) from the Yorkshire Dales National Park, which has some of the most spectacular scenery and countryside in the UK. Inner and southern areas of Leeds lie on a layer of coal measure sandstones. To the north parts are built on older sandstone and gritstones and to the east it extends into the magnesian limestone belt. The land use in the central areas of Leeds is overwhelmingly urban.

Attempts to define the exact geographic meaning of Leeds lead to a variety of concepts of its extent, varying by context include the area of the city centre, the urban sprawl, the administrative boundaries, and the functional region.

Leeds is much more a generalised concept place name in inverted commas, it is the city, but it is also the commuter villages and the region as well.

— Brian Thompson, A History of Modern Leeds

Leeds has a varying extent by context such as the city centre, the built-up sprawl around the centre, administrative boundaries and the travel to work area. The city centre lies in a narrow section of the Aire Valley at about 206 feet (63 m) above sea level. The land use in the central areas of Leeds is overwhelmingly urban. while being less than twenty miles (32 km) from the rural Yorkshire Dales National Park. It is contained within the Leeds Inner Ring Road, formed from parts of the A58 road, A61 road, A64 road, A643 road and the M621 motorway. Briggate, the principal north–south shopping street, is pedestrianised and Queen Victoria Street, a part of the Victoria Quarter, is enclosed under a glass roof. Millennium Square is a significant urban focal point.

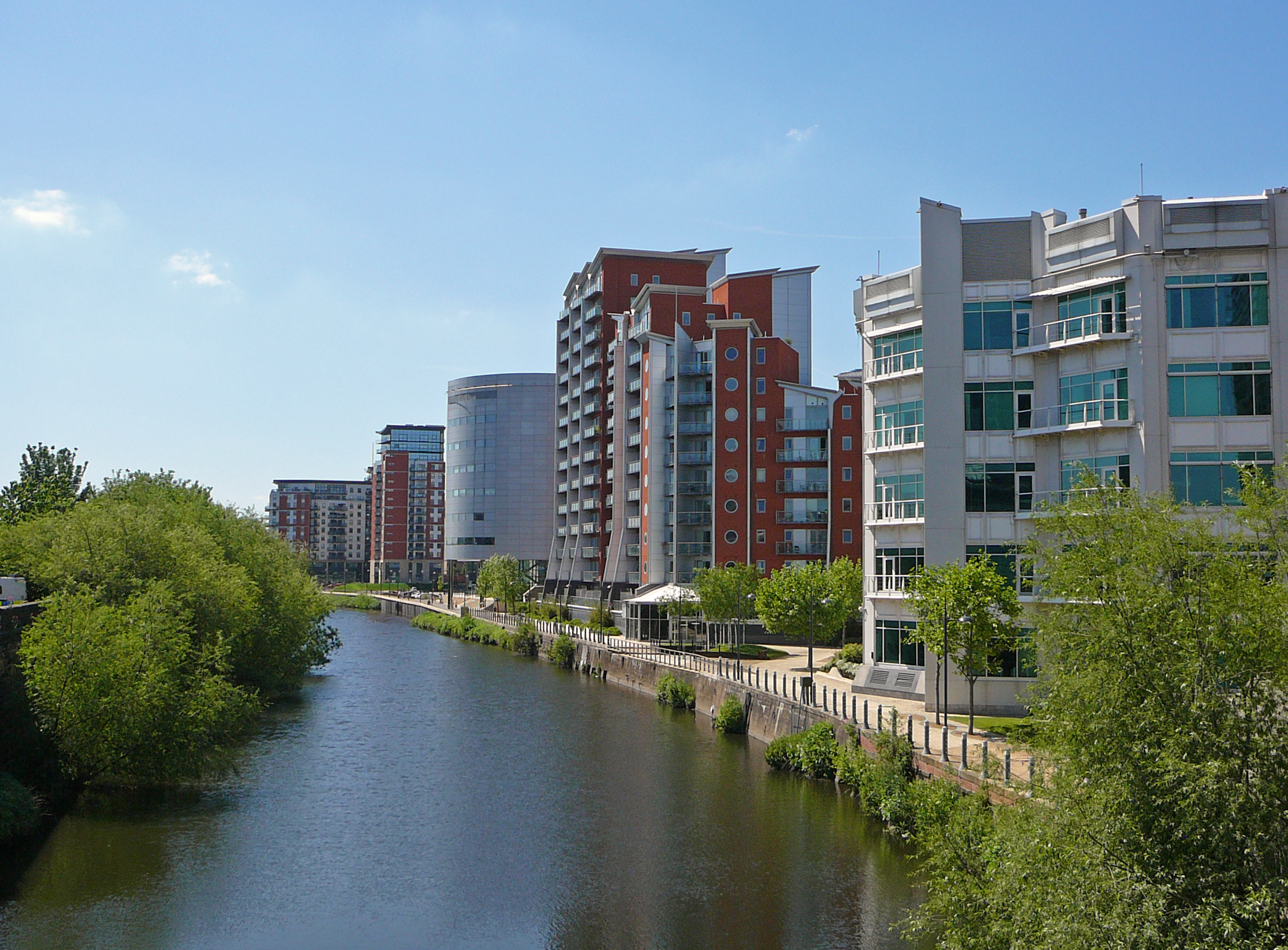
River Aire

Inner and southern areas of Leeds lie on a layer of coal measure sandstones forming the Yorkshire Coalfield. To the north parts are built on older sandstone and gritstones and to the east it extends into the magnesian limestone belt. Outside Leeds centre, there are a number of suburbs and exurbs within the district. Some of Leeds suburbs include Headingley, Harehills and Hunslet, while exurbs include Pudsey, Horsforth and Morley.

Lying in the eastern foothills of the Pennines, there is a significant variation in elevation within the city's built-up area. The district ranges from 1,115 feet (340 m) in the far west on the slopes of Ilkley Moor to about 33 feet (10 m) where the rivers Aire and Wharfe cross the eastern boundary. Land rises to 198 m (650 ft) in Cookridge, just 6 miles (9.7 km) from the city centre. The northern boundary follows the River Wharfe for several miles (several kilometres), but it crosses the river to include the part of Otley which lies north of the river. The Leeds postcode area covers most of the City of Leeds district and is almost entirely made up of the Leeds post town. Otley, Wetherby, Tadcaster, Pudsey and Ilkley are separate post towns within the postcode area.

=== Green belt ===
Leeds is within a green belt region that extends into the wider surrounding counties and is in place to reduce urban sprawl, prevent the settlements in the West Yorkshire conurbation from further convergence, protect the identity of outlying communities, encourage brownfield reuse, and preserve nearby countryside. This is achieved by restricting inappropriate development within the designated areas, and imposing stricter conditions on permitted building.

Over 60% of the Leeds district is green belt land and it surrounds the settlement, preventing further sprawl towards nearby communities. Larger outlying towns and villages are exempt from the green belt area. However, smaller villages, hamlets and rural areas are 'washed over' by the designation. The green belt was first adopted in 1960, and the size in the borough in 2017 amounted to some 33,970 hectares (339.7 km^{2}; 131.2 sq mi). A subsidiary aim of the green belt is to encourage recreation and leisure interests, with rural landscape features, greenfield areas and facilities including Temple Newsam Park and House with golf course, Rothwell Country Park, Middleton Park, Kirkstall Abbey ruins and surrounding park, Bedquilts recreation grounds, Waterloo lake, Roundhay castle and park, and Morwick, Cobble and Elmete Halls.

=== Climate ===
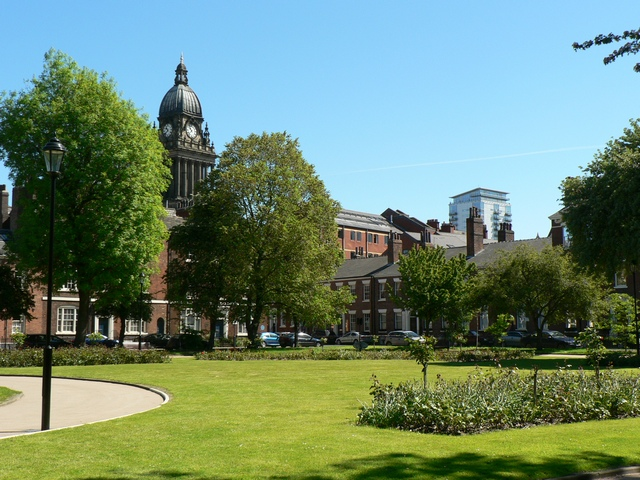
Sunny early-June 2006 day at Park Square

Leeds has a climate that is oceanic (Köppen: Cfb), and influenced by the Pennines. Summers are usually mild, with moderate rainfall, while winters are chilly, cloudy with occasional snow and frost. The nearest official weather recording station is at Bingley, some twelve miles (20 km) away at a higher altitude.

July and August are the warmest months, with a mean temperature of 15 °C (59 °F), while the coldest months are January and February, with a mean temperature of 3 °C (37 °F). Temperatures above 30 °C (86 °F) and below −10 °C (14 °F) are not very common but can happen occasionally. Temperatures at Leeds Bradford Airport fell to −12.6 °C (9.3 °F) in December 2010 and reached 31.8 °C (89 °F) at Leeds city centre in August 2003.

The record temperature for Leeds is 39.8 °C (104 °F) recorded on 19 July 2022 at Bramham 10 miles east of Leeds City Centre; it is likely that the temperature within Leeds City Centre exceeded this but the Leeds weather centre closed in 2000.

As is typical for many sprawling cities in areas of varying topography, temperatures can change depending on location. Average July and August daytime highs exceed 22 °C (72 °F) (a value comparable to South East England) in a small area just to the south east of the city centre, where the elevation declines to under 20 metres (66 feet). This is 2 °C (3.6 °F) milder than the typical summer temperature at Leeds Bradford airport weather station (shown in the chart below), at an elevation of 208 metres (682 feet). Situated on the eastern side of the Pennines, Leeds is among the driest cities in the United Kingdom, with an annual rainfall of 660 mm (25.98 in). Though extreme weather in Leeds is relatively rare, thunderstorms, blizzards, gale-force winds and even tornadoes have struck the city. The last reported tornado occurred on 14 September 2006, causing trees to uproot and signal failures at Leeds City railway station.

Climate data for Leeds Bradford, extremes 1985–2003
Month	Jan	Feb	Mar	Apr	May	Jun	Jul	Aug	Sep	Oct	Nov	Dec	Year
Record high °C (°F)	14.3 (57.7)	17.6 (63.7)	21.2 (70.2)	26.1 (79.0)	28.5 (83.3)	31.7 (89.1)	31.1 (88.0)	34.4 (93.9)	28.2 (82.8)	24.5 (76.1)	17.3 (63.1)	16.0 (60.8)	34.4 (93.9)
Mean daily maximum °C (°F)	5.8 (42.4)	5.9 (42.6)	8.7 (47.7)	11.3 (52.3)	15.0 (59.0)	18.2 (64.8)	19.9 (67.8)	19.9 (67.8)	17.3 (63.1)	13.4 (56.1)	8.8 (47.8)	6.7 (44.1)	12.6 (54.6)
Daily mean °C (°F)	3.1 (37.6)	3.1 (37.6)	5.2 (41.4)	7.2 (45.0)	10.3 (50.5)	13.4 (56.1)	15.2 (59.4)	15.2 (59.4)	13.0 (55.4)	9.9 (49.8)	5.9 (42.6)	4.0 (39.2)	8.8 (47.8)
Mean daily minimum °C (°F)	0.3 (32.5)	0.2 (32.4)	1.6 (34.9)	3.1 (37.6)	5.5 (41.9)	8.5 (47.3)	10.4 (50.7)	10.5 (50.9)	8.7 (47.7)	6.3 (43.3)	2.9 (37.2)	1.2 (34.2)	4.9 (40.9)
Record low °C (°F)	−8.1 (17.4)	−8.5 (16.7)	−6.6 (20.1)	−2.1 (28.2)	0.3 (32.5)	2.5 (36.5)	6.4 (43.5)	5.5 (41.9)	2.1 (35.8)	−3.9 (25.0)	−5.5 (22.1)	−7.9 (17.8)	−8.5 (16.7)
Average precipitation mm (inches)	61 (2.4)	45 (1.8)	52 (2.0)	48 (1.9)	54 (2.1)	54 (2.1)	51 (2.0)	65 (2.6)	57 (2.2)	55 (2.2)	57 (2.2)	61 (2.4)	660 (25.9)
Average precipitation days	17.5	14.2	14.8	13.5	13.7	12.2	11.7	13.2	12.9	15.1	16.5	17.0	172.3
Source 1: World Climates
Source 2: Starlings Roost Weather

== Demography ==
Leeds forms the main area of the City of Leeds metropolitan borough of West Yorkshire. This district includes Leeds itself as well as surrounding towns of Horsforth, Morley, Otley, Pudsey, Rothwell and Wetherby, Leeds is the central city of the Leeds City Region, a classification for the city region's metropolitan area. The city region has a population of over 3 million, making it the second most populated metropolitan city region in the United Kingdom, behind Greater London.

In January 2011, Leeds was named as one of five "cities to watch" in a report published by Centre for Cities. The report shows that the average resident in Leeds earns £471 per week, 17th nationally and 30.9% of Leeds residents had NVQ4+ high-level qualifications, 15th nationally. Employment in Leeds was 68.8% in the period June 2012 to June 2013, which was lower than the national average, whilst unemployment was higher than the national average at 9.6% over the same time period. Leeds is overall less deprived than other large UK cities and average income is above regional averages.

=== Urban subdivision ===
Leeds compared
Leeds urban subdivision shown within the West Yorkshire urban area Leeds urban subdivision within the West Yorkshire urban area
2021 UK Census	Leeds USD	Leeds district	West Yorks UA	England
Population	515,947	811,953	2,351,582	56,489,840
White	71.2%	79.0%	76.6%	81.0%
Asian	13.1%	9.7%	15.9%	9.6%
Black	8.3%	5.6%	3.1%	4.2%
Source: Office for National Statistics

At the time of the United Kingdom Census 2001, the Leeds urban subdivision occupied an area of 109 square kilometres (42 sq mi) and had a population of 443,247; making it the fourth-most populous urban subdivision within England and the fifth largest within the United Kingdom. The population density was 4,066 inhabitants per square kilometre (10,530/sq mi), slightly higher than the rest of the West Yorkshire Urban Area. It accounts for 20% of the area and 62% of the population of the City of Leeds. The population of the urban subdivision had a 100 to 93.1 female–male ratio. Of those over 16 years old, 39.4% were single (never married) and 35.4% married for the first time. The urban subdivision's 188,890 households included 35% one-person, 27.9% married couples living together, 8.8% were co-habiting couples, and 5.7% single parents with their children. Leeds is the largest component of the West Yorkshire Urban Area and is counted by Eurostat as part of the Leeds-Bradford larger urban zone. The Leeds travel to work area in 2001 included all of the City of Leeds, a northern strip of the City of Bradford, the eastern part of Kirklees, and a section of southern North Yorkshire; it occupies 751 square kilometres (290 sq mi).

Historical population
Year	Pop.	±%
1801	94,421	—
1811	108,459	+14.9%
1821	137,476	+26.8%
1831	183,015	+33.1%
1841	222,189	+21.4%
1851	249,992	+12.5%
1861	311,197	+24.5%
1871	372,402	+19.7%
1881	433,607	+16.4%
1891	503,493	+16.1%
1901	552,479	+9.7%
1911	606,250	+9.7%
1921	625,854	+3.2%
1931	646,119	+3.2%
1941	668,667	+3.5%
1951	692,003	+3.5%
1961	715,260	+3.4%
1971	739,401	+3.4%
1981	696,732	−5.8%
1991	716,760	+2.9%
2001	715,404	−0.2%
2011	751,500	+5.0%
Source: Vision of Britain

In 2011, the Leeds urban subdivision had a population of 474,632 and had an area of 112 square kilometres (43 sq mi) with a population density of 4,238 inhabitants per square kilometre (10,980/sq mi). It is bounded by, and physically attached to, the other towns of Garforth to the east, Morley to the southwest and Pudsey to the west, all being within the wider borough. 63% of the borough's population of 751,485 live in the urban subdivision, while it takes up only 21% of its total area of 552 km^{2}.

=== Metropolitan district ===
At the time of the 2021 UK Census, the district had a total population of 811,953, representing a 8% growth since the previous census ten years earlier. According to the 2001 UK Census, there were 301,614 households in Leeds; 33.3% were married couples living together, 31.6% were single-person households, 9.0% were co-habiting couples and 9.8% were single parents, following a similar trend to the rest of England. The population density was 1,967/km^{2} (5,090/sq mi) and for every 100 females, there were 93.5 males.

Leeds is a diverse city with over 75 ethnic groups, and with ethnic minorities representing 21% of the total population. According to figures from the 2021 UK Census, 79% of the population was White (73.4% White British, 0.8% White Irish, 0.2% Gypsy or Irish Traveller, 4.5% Other White), 3.3% of mixed race (1.2% White and Black Caribbean, 0.5% White and Black African, 0.9% White and Asian, 0.7% Other Mixed), 9.7% Asian (3.9% Pakistani, 2.6% Indian, 0.7% Bangladeshi, 1.0% Chinese, 1.5% Other Asian), 5.6% Black (4.0% African, 1.0% Caribbean, 0.6% Other Black), 0.7% Arab and 1.6% of other ethnic heritage. Leeds has seen many new different countries of birth as of the UK Census including Pakistan, Zimbabwe, Iran, India and Nigeria all included in the top ten countries of birth in the city. Large Pakistani communities can be seen in wards such as Gipton and Harehills. Chapel Allerton is known for having a large Caribbean community.

The majority of people in Leeds identify themselves as Christian. The proportion of Muslims (3.0% of the population) is average for the country. Leeds has the third-largest community of Jews in the United Kingdom, after those of London and Manchester. The areas of Alwoodley and Moortown contain sizeable Jewish communities. 16.8% of Leeds residents in the 2001 census declared themselves as having "No Religion", which is broadly in line with the figure for the whole of the UK (also 8.1% "religion not stated"). The crime rate in Leeds is well above the national average, like many other English major cities. In July 2006, the think tank Reform calculated rates of crime for different offences and has related this to populations of major urban areas (defined as towns over 100,000 population). Leeds was 11th in this rating (excluding London boroughs, 23rd including London boroughs). Total recorded crime in Leeds fell by 45% between March 2002 and December 2011

== Governance ==
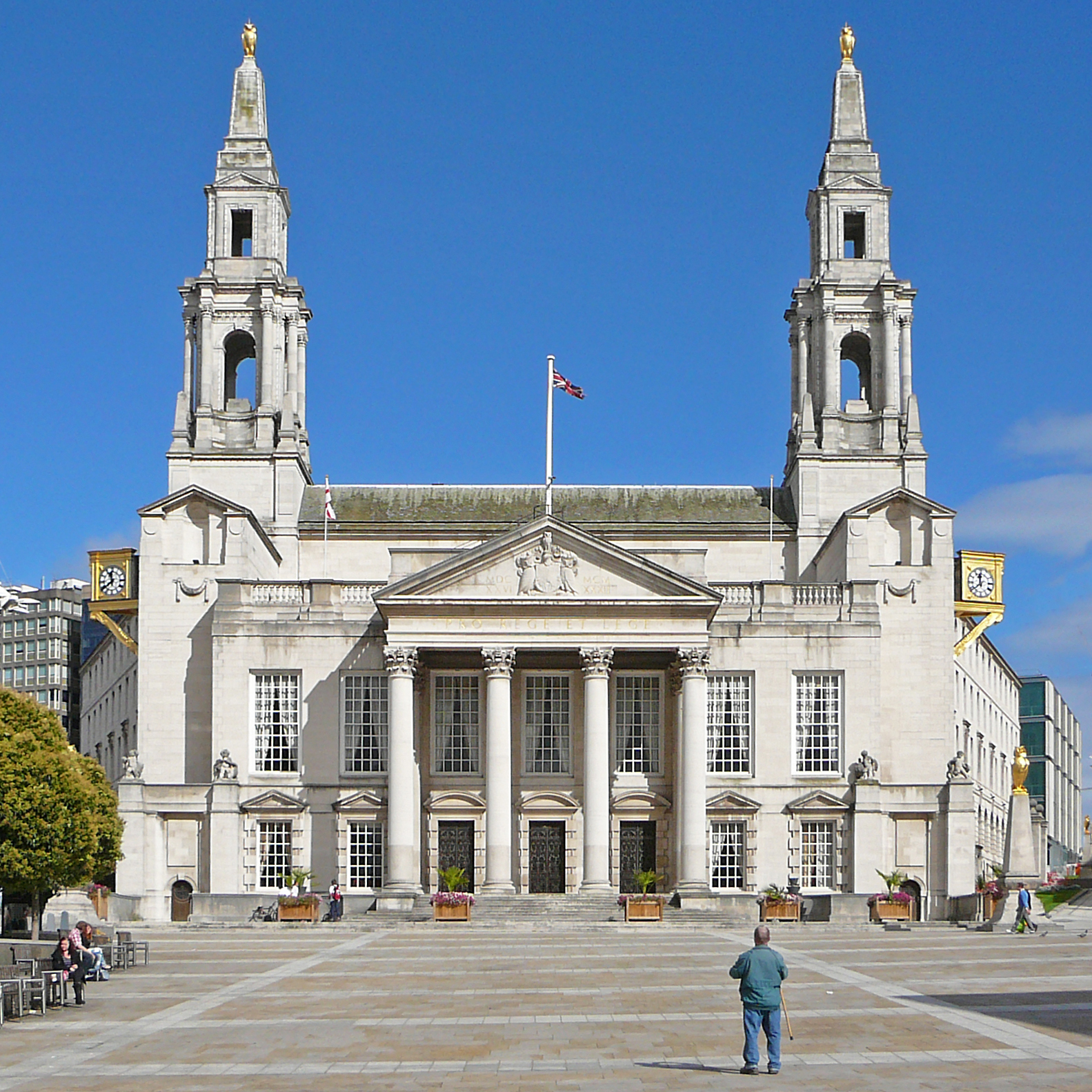
Leeds Civic Hall is the seat of local government.

The City of Leeds is the local government district covering Leeds, and the local authority is Leeds City Council. The council is composed of 99 councillors, three for each of the district's wards. Elections are held three years out of four, on the first Thursday of May. One third of the councillors are elected, for a four-year term, in each election. The council is currently controlled by Labour. Leeds City Council is the primary provider of local government services for the city. The district is in the Yorkshire and the Humber region of England.

In March 2020, along with the four other Local Authorities in West Yorkshire, Leeds City Council agreed a Devolution Deal with the UK Government. This resulted in the election of a Metro Mayor for West Yorkshire in 2021. The current mayor is Tracy Brabin. The mayor leads the West Yorkshire Combined Authority which was first established in 2014, and is based in Leeds.

Most of the district is an unparished area. In the unparished area, there is no lower tier of government. Outside the unparished area, there are 31 civil parishes, represented by parish councils. These are the lowest tier of local government and absorb some limited functions from Leeds City Council in their areas.

The district is represented by ten MPs, for the constituencies of Leeds Central and Headingley (Alex Sobel, Labour); Leeds East (Richard Burgon, Labour); Leeds North East (Fabian Hamilton, Labour); Leeds North West (Katie White, Labour); Leeds South (Hilary Benn, Labour); Leeds South West and Morley (Mark Sewards, Labour); Leeds West and Pudsey (Rachel Reeves, Labour); Selby (constituency shared with North Yorkshire) (Keir Mather, Labour); Wakefield and Rothwell (constituency shared with City of Wakefield) (Simon Lightwood, Labour); and Wetherby and Easingwold (constituency shared with North Yorkshire) (Alec Shelbrooke, Conservative).

== Economy ==
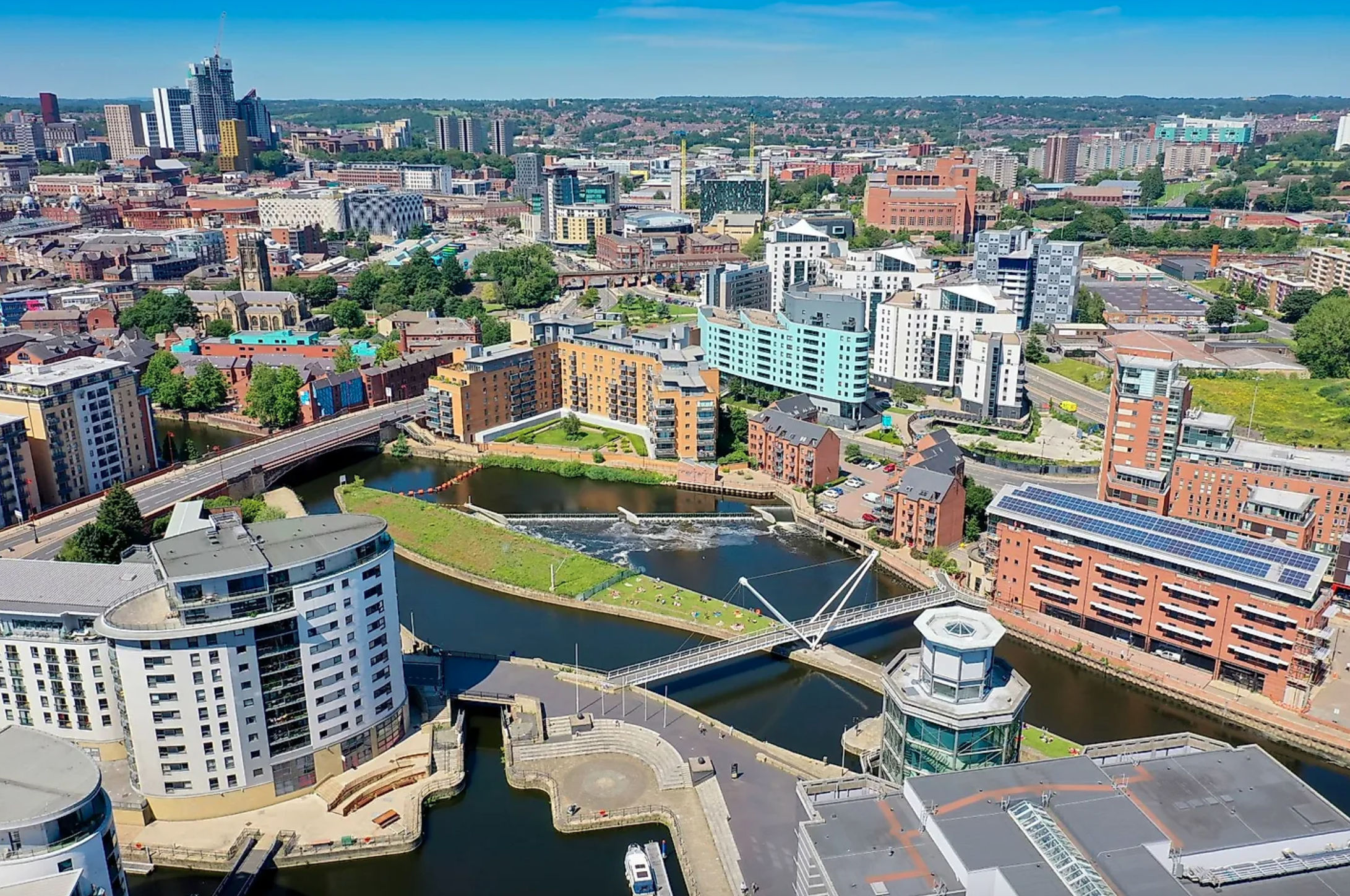
With an economy worth £64.6 billion, Leeds is forecast to grow 21% over the next 10 years.

Leeds has the most diverse economy of all the UK's main employment centres. It has seen the fastest rate of private sector jobs growth of any UK city and has the highest ratio of public to private sector jobs of all the UK's Core Cities. The city had the third-largest jobs total by local authority area with 480,000 in employment and self-employment at the beginning of 2015. 24.7% were in public administration, education and health, 23.9% were in banking, finance and insurance and 21.4% were in distribution, hotels and restaurants. It is in the banking, finance and insurance sectors that Leeds differs most from the financial structure of the region and the nation. There are 130,100 jobs in the city centre, accounting for 31% of all jobs in the wider district. In 2007, 47,500 jobs were in finance and business, 42,300 in public services, and 19,500 in retail and distribution. 43% of finance sector jobs in the district are contained in Leeds city centre and 44% of those employed in the city centre live more than nine kilometres (5.6 miles) away.

In 2011, the financial and services industry in Leeds was worth £2.1 billion, the fifth-largest in the UK, behind London, Edinburgh, Manchester and Birmingham. Tertiary industries such as retail, call centres, offices and media have contributed to a high rate of economic growth. The city also hosts the only subsidiary office of the Bank of England in the UK. In 2012 GVA for the city was recorded at £18.8 billion, with the entire Leeds City Region generating a £56 billion economy.

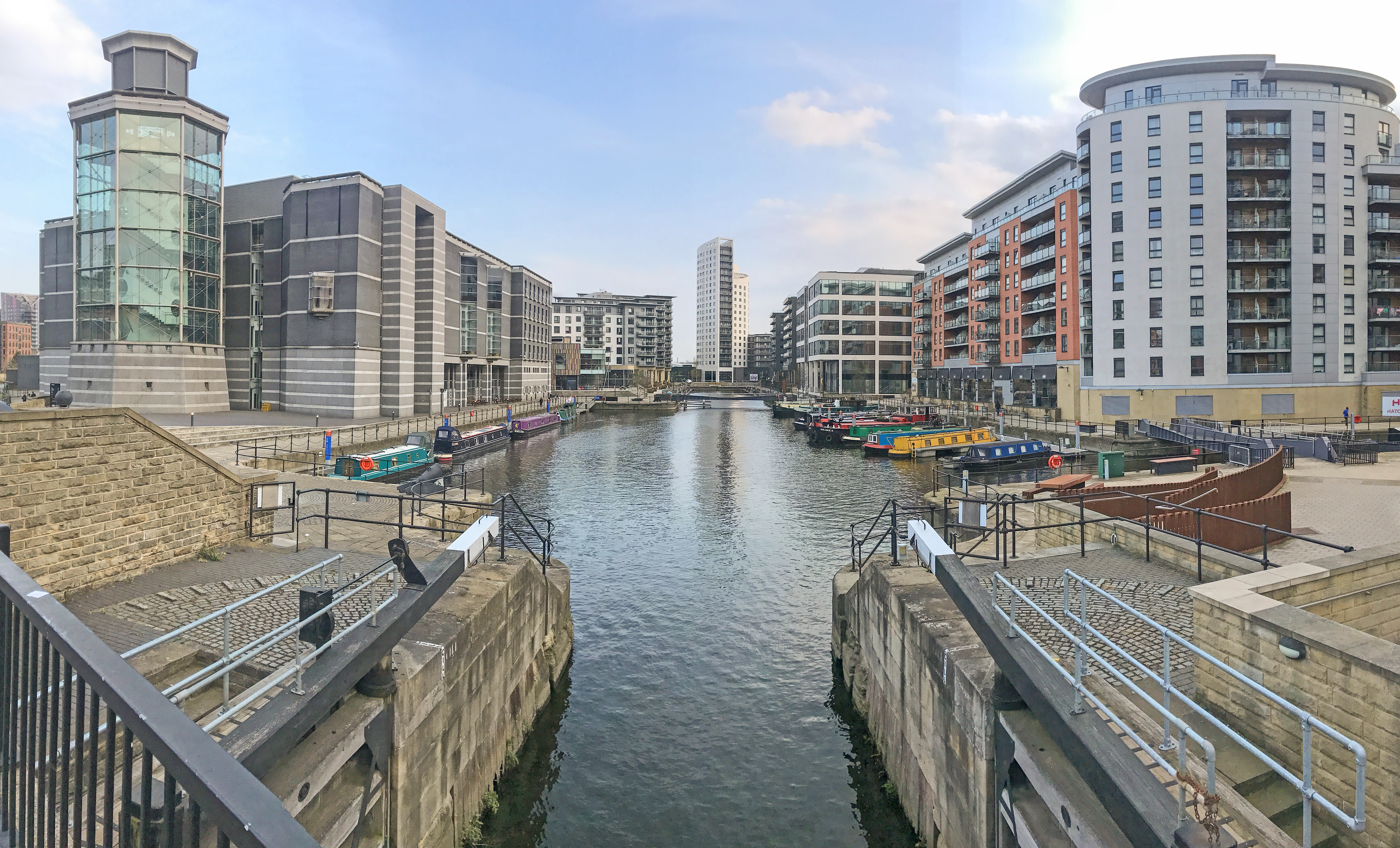
Leeds Docks

Key sectors include finance, retail, leisure and the visitor economy, construction, manufacturing and the creative and digital industries. It has one of the most diverse economies of all the UK's main employment centres and has seen the fastest rate of private-sector jobs growth of any UK city. It also has the highest ratio of private to public sector jobs of all the UK's Core Cities, with 77% of its workforce working in the private sector. Leeds has the third-largest jobs total by local authority area, with 480,000 in employment and self-employment at the beginning of 2015. Leeds is ranked as a "High Sufficiency" level city by the Globalization and World Cities Research Network. Today, Leeds has become the largest legal and financial centre outside London, with the financial and insurance services industry worth £13 billion to the city's economy.

Office developments, also traditionally located in the inner area, have expanded south of the River Aire and total 11,000,000 square feet (1,000,000 m^{2}) of space. In the period from 1999 to 2008 £2.5 billion of property development was undertaken in central Leeds; of which £711 million has been offices, £265 million retail, £389 million leisure and £794 million housing. The city saw several firsts, including the oldest-surviving film in existence, Roundhay Garden Scene (1888), and the 1767 invention of soda water.

Major companies based in the city include William Hill, Channel 4, International Personal Finance, Asda, Leeds Building Society and Northern Foods. Capita Group, KPMG, Direct Line, Aviva, Yorkshire Building Society, BT Group, Telefónica Europe (O2 Ltd) and TD Waterhouse all also have a considerable presence in the city. In addition to other national governmental offices, the city is home to a large Department for Work and Pensions office building located in Quarry Hill, notable for its imposing design.

Leeds is the UK's third-largest manufacturing centre and 50% of the UK's manufacturing base is within a two-hour drive of Leeds. With around 1,800 firms and 39,000 employees, Leeds manufacturing firms account for 8.8% of total employment in the city. The largest sub-sectors are engineering, printing and publishing, food and drink, chemicals and medical technology. Manufacturing and distribution accounted for £26 million of new property development in the period. There is an established creative industry in the city, particularly in the digital gaming sector. A number of large developers have studios in and around the city, including Activision, developers of the mobile versions of the Call of Duty series, and Rockstar Leeds, developers of the Grand Theft Auto series. In 2009 Leeds was the first city outside London to host the Eurogamer Expo.

=== Finance ===
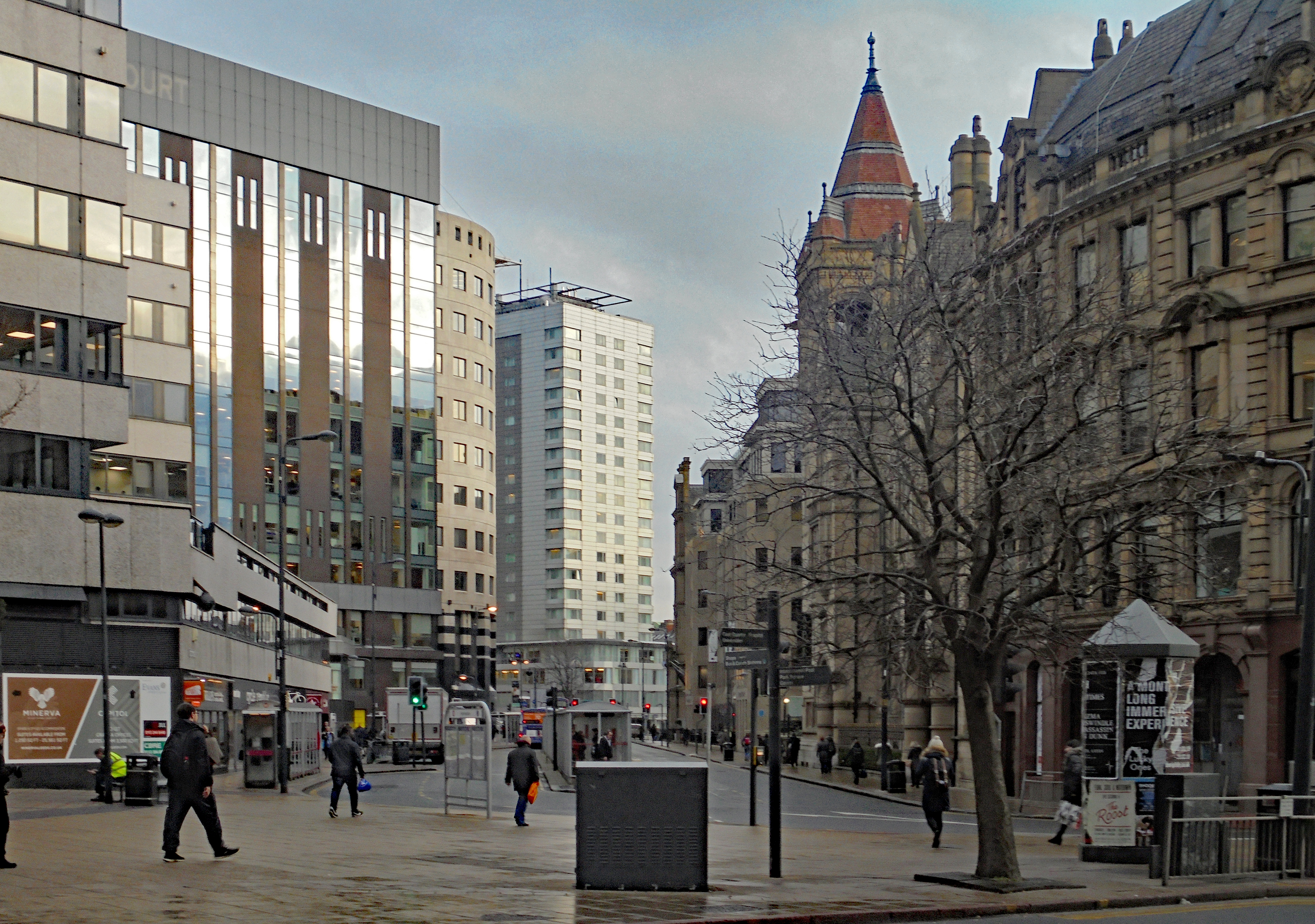
The central business district

Leeds is the largest centre outside London for financial and business services. Over the next ten years, the economy is forecast to grow by 25% with financial and business services set to generate over half of GVA growth over that period with Finance and business services accounting for 38% of total output.

The finance and business service sector account for 38% of total output with more than 30 national and international banks located in the city, including an office of the Bank of England.

Leeds has over 30 national and international banks, many of whose northern or regional offices are based in the city. It is the headquarters for First Direct and Yorkshire Bank, and has large Barclays, HSBC, Lloyds Banking Group, NatWest Group and Santander operations. The city is also an important centre for equity, venture, infrastructure and risk finance. The venture capital provider, YFM Equity Partners, founded in Leeds, is now the UK's largest provider of risk capital to small and medium-sized enterprises. The National Wealth Fund, founded to support economic growth across the United Kingdom, is also based in Leeds.

=== Law ===
There are around 150 law firms operating in Leeds, employing over 6,700 people. According to The UK Legal 500, "Leeds has a sophisticated and highly competitive legal market, second only to London." Specialist legal expertise to be found in Leeds includes corporate finance, corporate restructuring and insolvency, global project financing, trade and investment, commercial litigation, competition, construction, Private Finance Initiatives and Public Private Partnerships, tax, derivatives, IT, employment, pensions, intellectual property, sport and entertainment. The establishment of an Administrative Court in Leeds in April 2009 reinforced the position of Leeds as one of the UK's key legal centres. The court previously sat only in London.

=== Leisure and tourism ===
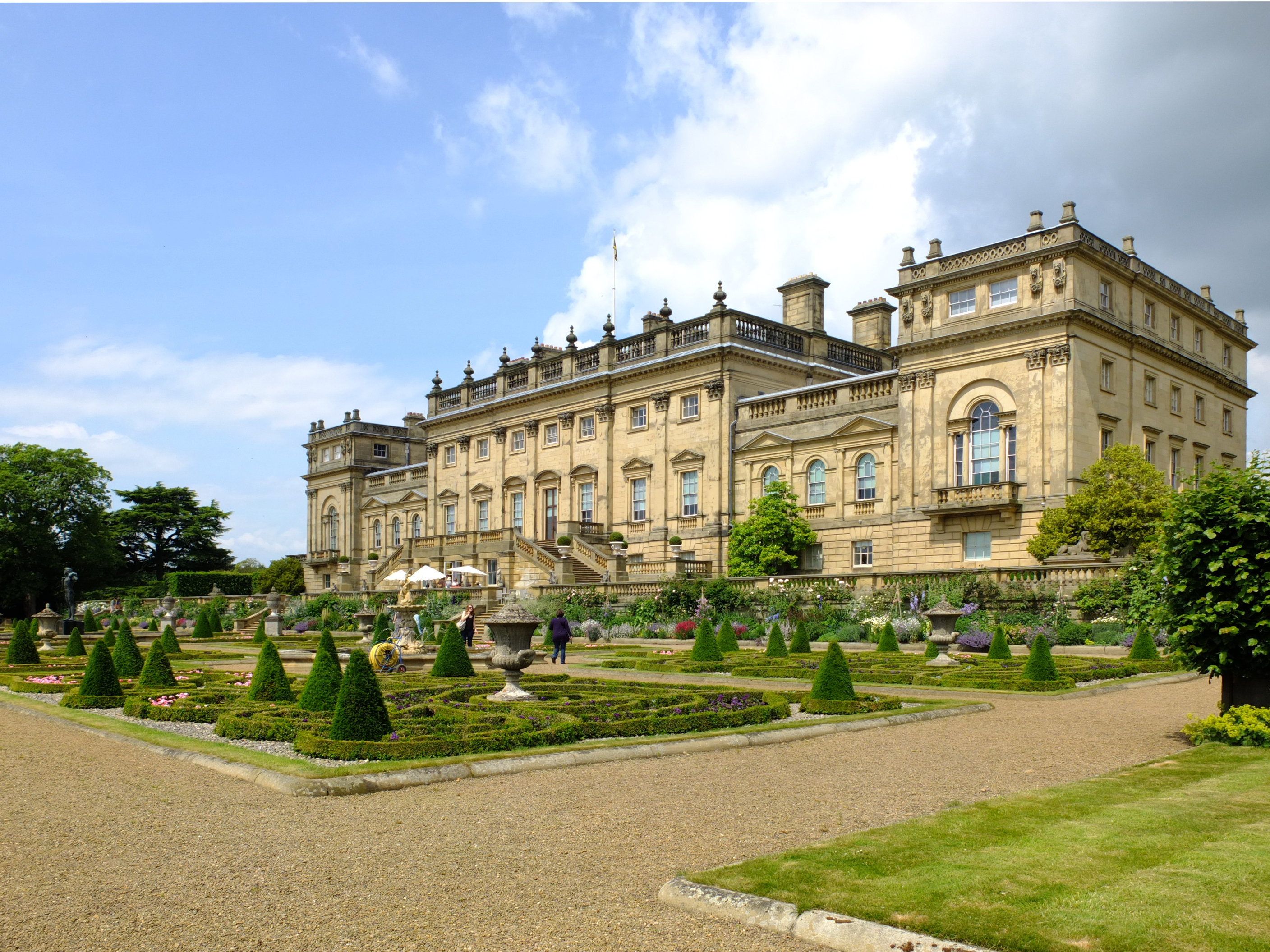
Harewood House is a member of the Treasure Houses of England, a marketing consortium for ten of the foremost historic homes in the country.

Tourism is important to the Leeds economy, in 2009 Leeds was the eighth-most visited city in England by UK visitors. and the 13th-most visited city by overseas visitors. Research by VisitEngland reported that the day visitor market to Leeds attracts 24.9 million people each year, worth over £654 million to the local economy. In the 2017 Condé Nast Traveler survey of readers, Leeds rated 6th among the 15 best cities in the UK for visitors.

In 2016, Leeds received 27.29 million leisure tourist visits generating over £1.6 billion for the city, according to data from a STEAM survey. That was a 15.9% increase in revenue over 2015. A 9.7% increase in visits had been recorded since 2013. The industry supported over 19,000 full-time equivalent jobs in 2016.

=== Public sector ===
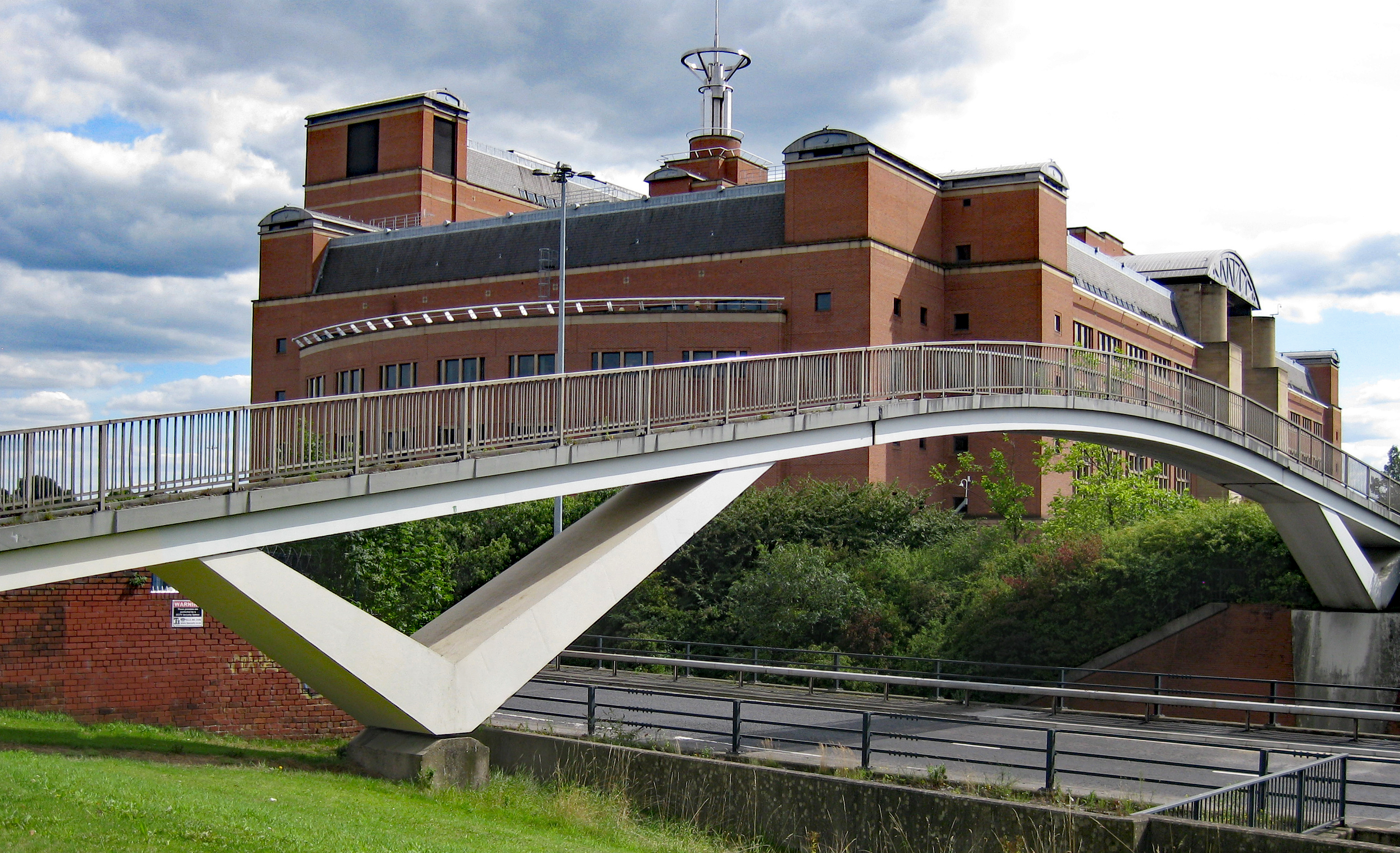
NHS England HQ

In Leeds, 108,000 people work in the public sector—24% of the workforce. The largest employers are Leeds City Council, with 33,000 staff, and the Leeds Teaching Hospitals NHS Trust, with 14,000 staff.

Leeds has become a hub of public-sector health bodies. The Department of Health and Social Care (DHSC), NHS England, the Care Quality Commission, NHS Digital, and Public Health England all have large offices in Leeds. Europe's largest teaching hospital is also based in Leeds, and is home to the Yorkshire Cancer Centre, the largest of its kind in Europe.

Key government departments and organisations in Leeds include the Department for Work and Pensions, with over 3,000 staff, the DHSC, with over 800 staff, HM Revenue and Customs with over 1,200 staff and the British Library with 1,100 staff.

=== Trade ===
Briggate in July 2026

The city centre has a large pedestrian zone. Briggate is the main shopping street where one can find many well-known British High Street stores, including Marks & Spencer, Costa Coffee, and Harvey Nichols. Many companies have several stores within Central Leeds and the wider city.

Leeds is home to one of the largest indoor markets in Europe, Leeds Kirkgate Market. The district also has various regular local markets in Otley, Pudsey, and Yeadon. Between 1987 – 1995, Leeds Kirkgate market was renovated. The changes have maximised the retail provision in the market without compromising the historical features of the building, so much so that the renovated Kirkgate Market Hall structure was promoted from Grade II to Grade I listing status, and was subsequently nominated for a Civic Trust Award.

There is an annual German Christmas Market ("Christkindelmarkt") based in Millennium Square, usually running from early November to mid-late December. The 2020 Christmas Market was cancelled because of the coronavirus pandemic. The extensive retail area of Leeds is the principal regional shopping centre for the whole of the Yorkshire and the Humber region, offering a spend of £1.93 billion annually in 2013. There are a number of indoor shopping centres in the centre of the city, including the Merrion Centre, St John's Centre, The Core, the Victoria Quarter, The Light, the Corn Exchange, Trinity Leeds, and Victoria Gate. In total, there are well over 1,000 retail stores, with a combined floorspace of 3,660,000 square feet (340,000 m^{2}) in Leeds City Centre.

Victoria Quarter, opened in 1900

The Victoria Quarter is notable for its high-end luxury retailers and architecture. 70 stores such as Louis Vuitton, Vivienne Westwood, Diesel, and anchor Harvey Nichols are contained within two iron-wrought Victorian arcades, and a new arcade formed by arcading Queen Victoria Street with the largest expanse of stained glass in Britain.

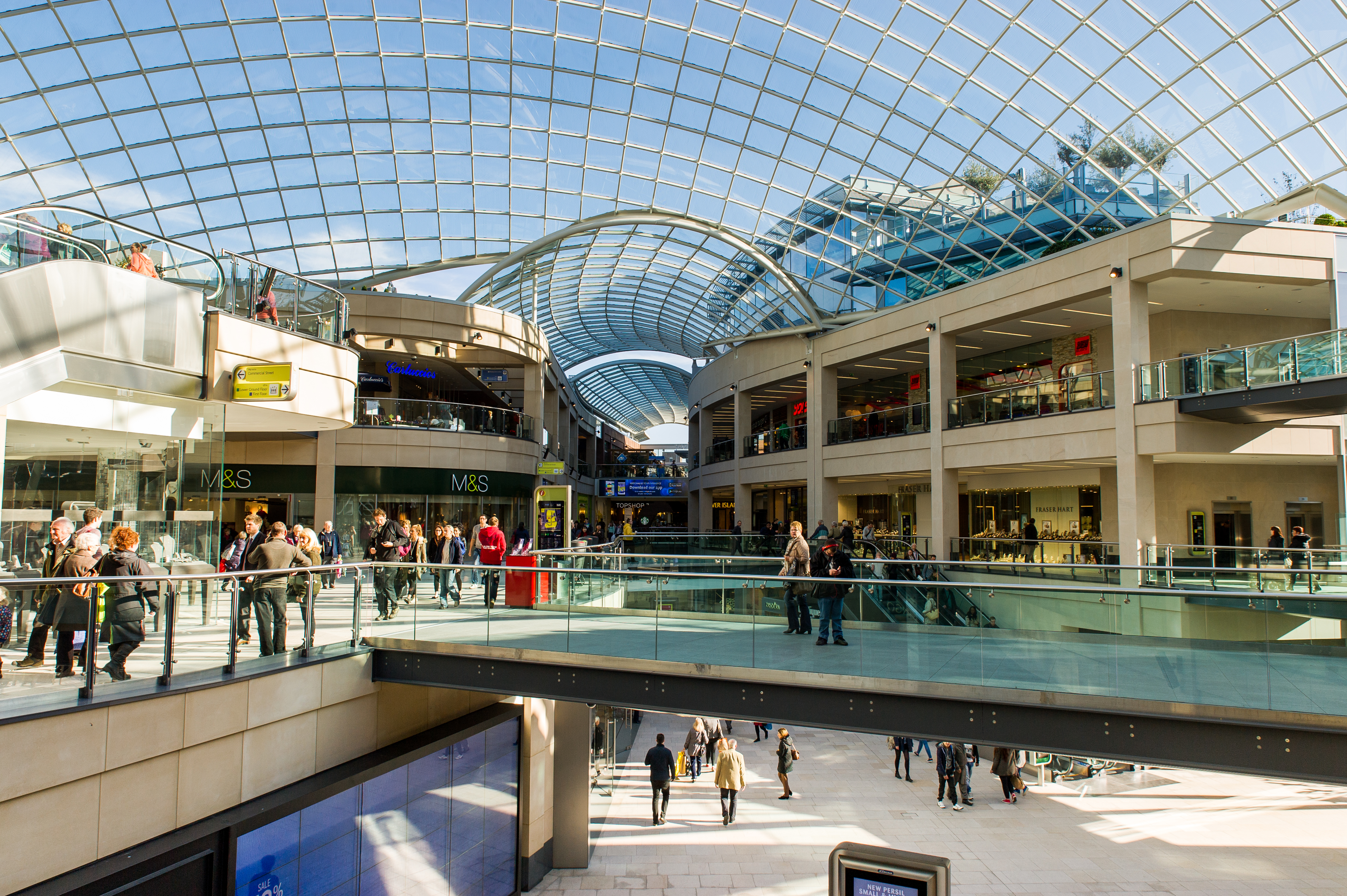
Trinity Leeds is the largest shopping centre in Leeds, and one of the largest in Europe.

In the Churwell area of Leeds is the White Rose Shopping Centre. Opening in 1997, the centre has over 100 high street stores anchored by Marks & Spencer, Primark, NEXT, and Sainsbury's.

On 21 March 2013, a large shopping and leisure complex called Trinity Leeds opened in the city centre. The modern and interactive retail space covers the old Burton Arcades and the former Leeds Shopping Plaza with its main entrance from Briggate.

On 20 October 2016, Victoria Gate shopping centre opened with its flagship store, John Lewis. Three quarters of the stores in Victoria Gate were the first for the retailers outside of London. Of the 40,000 people who work in retailing in Leeds, three quarters work in the wider district. The Springs, located to the east of the city suburbs, just off junction 46 of the M1.

== Landmarks ==
Leeds displays a variety of natural and built landmarks. Natural landmarks include such diverse sites as the gritstone outcrop of Otley Chevin and the Fairburn Ings RSPB reserve. The city's parks at Roundhay and Temple Newsam have long been owned and maintained by the council for the benefit of ratepayers and among the open spaces in the centre of Leeds are Millennium Square, City Square, Park Square, and Victoria Gardens. This last is the site of the central city war memorial: there are 42 other war memorials in the suburbs, towns and villages in the district.

Leeds City Square

The built environment embraces edifices of civic pride like Morley Town Hall and the trio of buildings in Leeds, Leeds Town Hall, Corn Exchange, and Leeds City Museum, by the architect Cuthbert Brodrick. The two white buildings on the Leeds skyline are the Parkinson building of Leeds University and the Civic Hall, with golden owls adorning the tops of the latter's twin spires.

Armley Mills, Tower Works, with its campanile-inspired towers, and the Egyptian-style Temple Works hark back to the city's industrial past, while the site and ruins of Kirkstall Abbey display the beauty and grandeur of Cistercian architecture. Notable churches are Leeds Minster (formerly Leeds Parish Church), St George's Church and Leeds Cathedral, in the city centre, and the Church of St John the Baptist, Adel and Bardsey Parish Church in quieter locations. Notable non-conformist chapels include the Salem Chapel, dating back to 1791 and notably the birthplace of Leeds United Football Club in 1919.

Leeds is one of only a few UK cities outside of London to have a significant number of high-rise buildings, the 112-metre (367 ft) tower of Bridgewater Place, also known as The Dalek, is part of a major office and residential development and was the region's tallest building until Altus House was completed in 2021; it can be seen for miles (kilometres) around. Among other Skyscrapers the 37-storey Sky Plaza to the north of the city centre stands on higher ground so that its 106 metres (348 ft) is higher than Bridgewater Place and the aforementioned, 38-storey Altus House in Arena Quarter, standing at 380 metres. Elland Road (football) and Headingley Stadium (cricket and rugby) are well known to sports enthusiasts, and the White Rose Centre is a well-known retail outlet.

== Transport ==
Leeds has extensive road, bus and rail networks. Public transport in the Leeds area is coordinated and developed by West Yorkshire Metro.

The city has good rail and road links to the rest of the country. Leeds railway station is one of the busiest in Britain, and Leeds is connected to the national road network via the A1(M) motorway, M1 motorway and M62 motorway. The city is served by Leeds Bradford Airport. Plans to improve the public transport network in Leeds have been suggested. In the 1940s plans to build an extensive underground system were not proceeded with because of the Second World War. The Leeds Supertram in the 1990s at a cost of £500 million was cancelled by the Transport Minister Alistair Darling in 2005 after £40 million had been spent on the project due to unforeseen added costs. A proposed £250 million re-introduction of trolleybus in 2007; the plans were cancelled in May 2016 citing little value for money, after millions of pounds spent on inquiries.

In June 2019, in his bid to become Prime Minister, Boris Johnson stated that it was "madness" that Leeds did not have a metro system. In December 2019, in his first Queen's Speech, Johnson promised to "remedy the scandal that Leeds is the largest city in Western Europe without light rail or a metro". Plans are in place to improve public transport in Leeds, with upgrades to railway, bus services, and cycle lanes. A tram system for the city and wider region was announced in 2023.

=== Road ===
Leeds is the starting point of the A62, A63, A64, A65, A647, and A660 roads. The city is on the A58, A61 roads, the M1 and M62 motorways intersect to the south of Leeds and the A1(M) passes to the east. The radial M621 takes traffic into central Leeds from the M62 and M1, the Leeds Inner Ring Road has part motorway status and the city has an outer ring road. Part of the city centre is pedestrianised and encircled by the clockwise-only loop road. The East Leeds Orbital Route's construction started in summer 2019 and was completed in 2021.

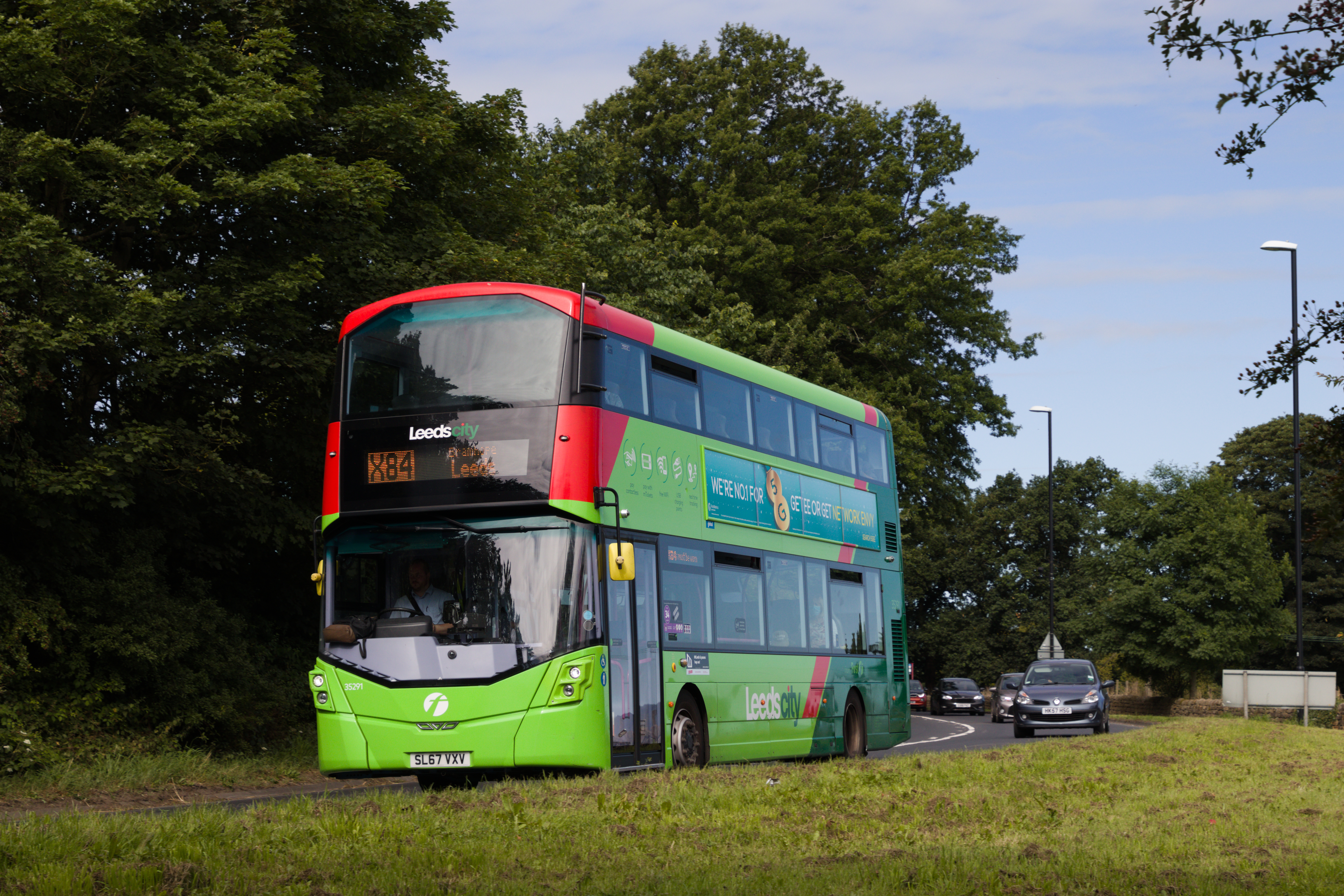
Bus networks are widespread throughout the city and wider region.

Air quality in Leeds was declared "unsafe" by the World Health Organization in May 2019. Neville Street, near Leeds railway station, has been measured as the most polluted street outside London. A Clean Air Zone, throughout north Leeds and the city centre, was proposed in 2018. The plan, similar to the London Low Emission Zone, would charge a daily fee for driving "older models of buses, taxis and HGVs" in the zone. The zone was planned to start charging vehicles in January 2020, before being cancelled in October 2020 because of improvements in the city's air quality.

==== Buses ====
Leeds City bus station (on Dyer Street) has long-distance bus services to nearby towns and cities and a small number of local area services. The main providers are First Leeds and Arriva Yorkshire, the latter serves routes in the city's south. Harrogate Bus Company provides a service to Harrogate and Ripon. Keighley Bus Company provides a service to Shipley, Bingley, and Keighley. The Yorkshire Coastliner service runs from Leeds to Scarborough and Whitby via York and Malton. Also Transdev operates Flyer services to Leeds Bradford Airport.

In March 2024, the West Yorkshire Combined Authority announced that buses in Leeds are set to be operated under public ownership.

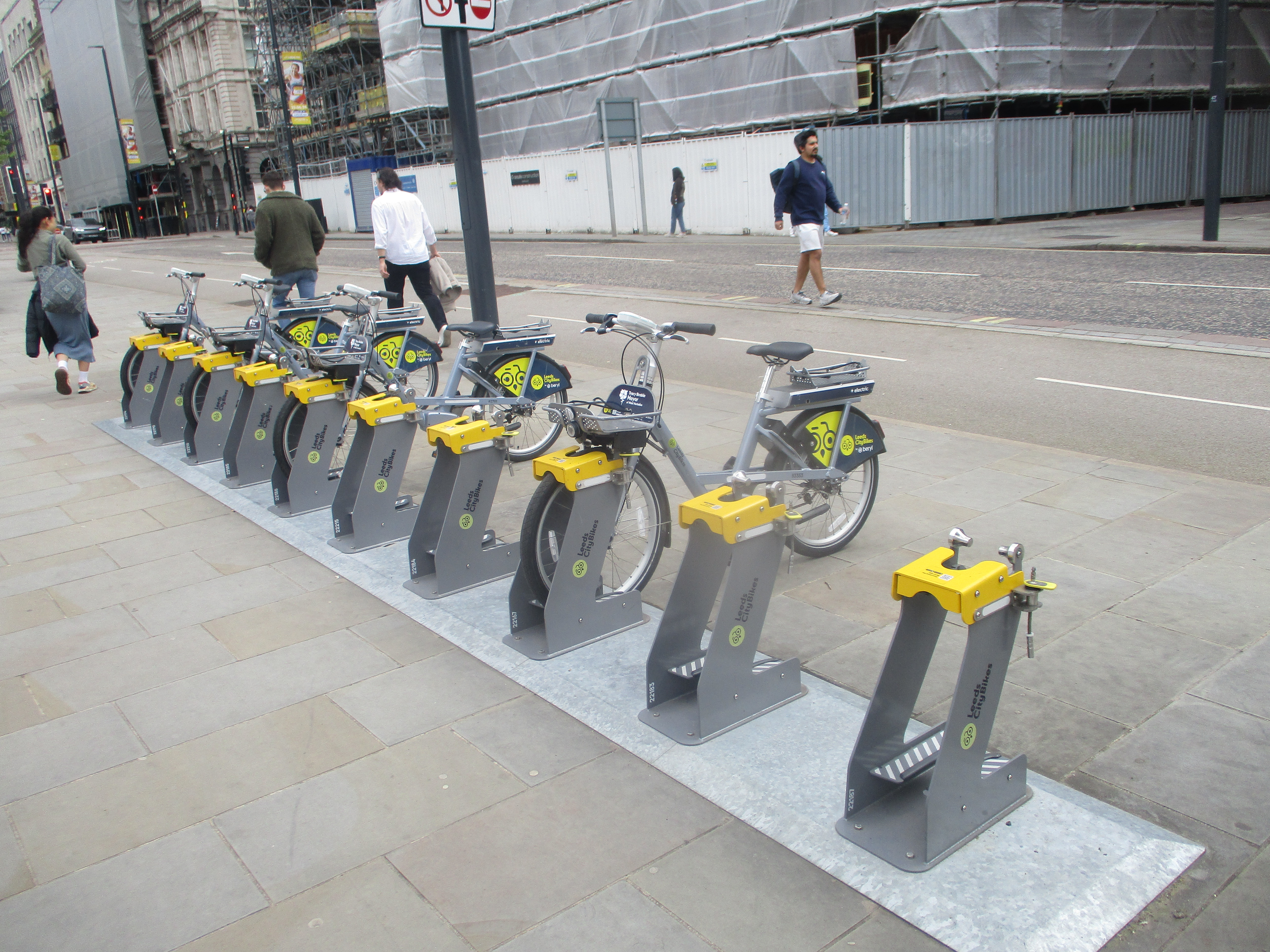
Electric rental bicycles are now widespread throughout the city.

==== Cycling ====
An electric bicycle rental scheme, Leeds City Bikes, operated by Beryl, opened in September 2023. The bikes are collected from bays around the city centre, and hirers are penalised if they do not return the bike to one of the bays.

=== Rail ===
Leeds railway station

In 2017, Leeds had the third busiest railway station in the UK outside of London. From the station at New Station Street, West Yorkshire Metro trains operated by Northern run to the suburbs of Leeds, with numerous operators providing regional and long-distance connections. The station has 18 platforms, the most for any one station in England outside of London.

The City of Leeds local government area has 16 railway stations. A parkway station serving Leeds Bradford Airport and two other new stations in the area, planned for the next 20 years, were announced in 2016.

=== Air ===
Leeds Bradford Airport is in Yeadon, about 8 miles (13 km) to the north-west of the city centre, and has direct flights to eight UK and 70 international destinations. It is the tenth busiest airport outside London, with scheduled services to Amsterdam, Dublin, and Barcelona. There is a direct rail service from Leeds city centre to Manchester Airport.

=== Walking ===
Leeds is claimed by the city council to be one of the best cities in the UK for walking. The Leeds Country Way is a waymarked circular walk of 62 miles (100 km) through the rural outskirts of the city, never more than 7 miles (11 km) from City Square. The Meanwood Valley Trail leads from Woodhouse Moor along Meanwood Beck to Golden Acre Park. The Leeds extension of the Dales Way follows the Meanwood Valley Trail before it branches off to head towards Ilkley and Windermere. Leeds is on the northern section of the Trans Pennine Trail for walkers and cyclists, and the towpath of the Leeds and Liverpool Canal is another walking and cycling route. The White Rose Way walking trail to Scarborough begins at City Square. There are many parks and public footpaths in both the urban and rural parts of Leeds, and The Ramblers' Association, YHA and other walking organisations offer sociable walks. The Ramblers' Association publish booklets of walks in and around Leeds.

== Education ==
=== Museums ===
Leeds has 16 museums and galleries including nine that are council-run. Smaller museums in Leeds include Otley Museum; Horsforth Village Museum; ULITA, an Archive of International Textiles; and the museum at Fulneck Moravian Settlement. Leeds City Museum opened in 2008 at Millennium Square. It is a major museum for the city, showcasing its designated collections of local history; world cultures; natural history; archaeology and fine and decorative arts plus a diverse programme of special exhibitions.

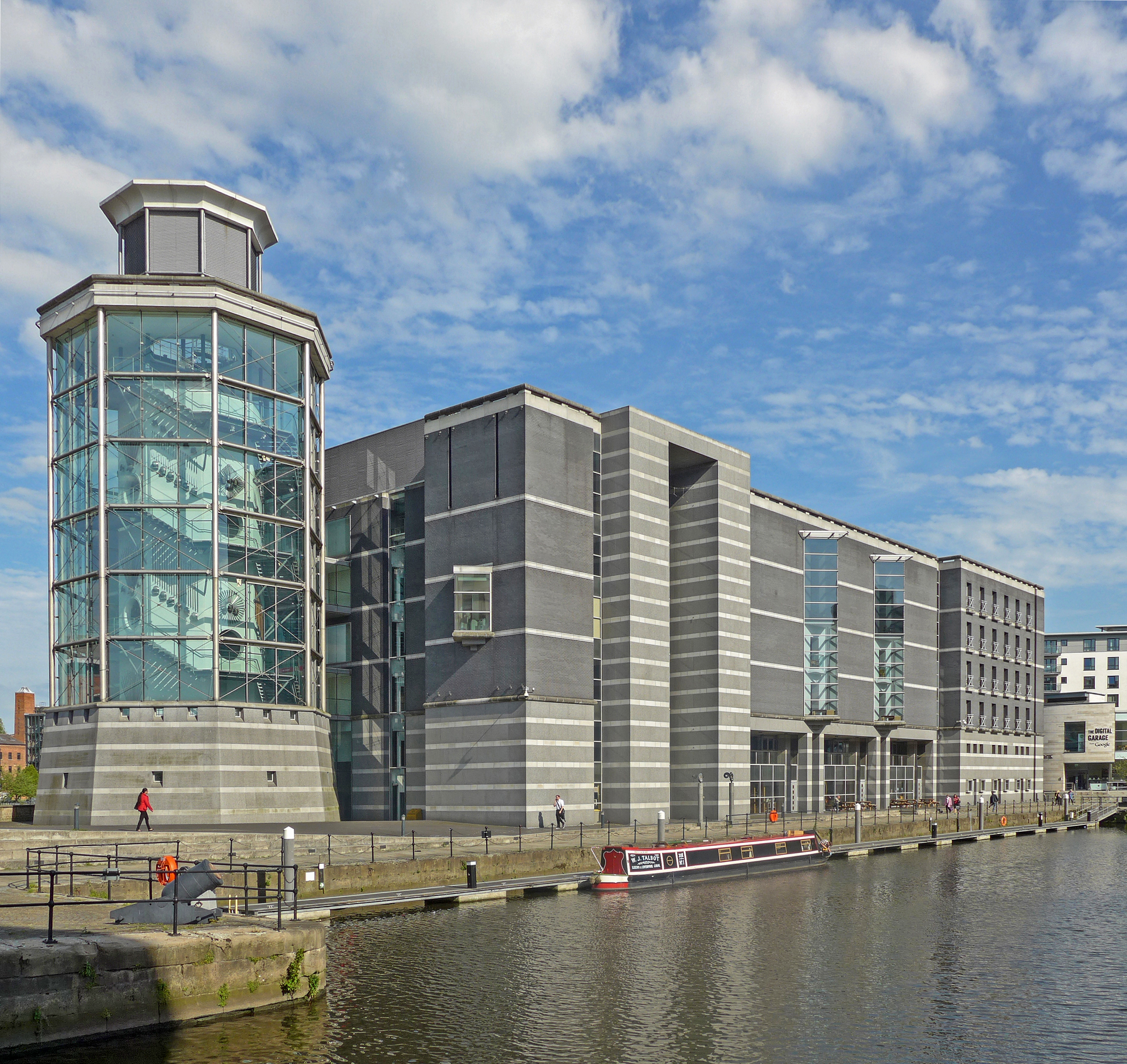
Royal Armouries Museum

Abbey House Museum is housed in the former gatehouse of Kirkstall Abbey, and includes walk-through Victorian streets and galleries describing the history of the abbey, childhood, and Victorian Leeds. Armley Mills Industrial Museum is housed in what was once the world's largest woollen mill, and includes industrial machinery and railway locomotives. This museum also shows the first known moving pictures in the world which were taken in the city, by Louis Le Prince, of a Roundhay Garden Scene and of Leeds Bridge in 1888. Thackray Museum of Medicine is a museum of the history of medicine, featuring topics such as Victorian public health, pre-anaesthesia surgery, and safety in childbirth. It is housed in a former workhouse next to St James's Hospital. The museum closed temporarily in 2019 for a £4 million refurbishment. The redeveloped museum has since been shortlisted for Art Fund's Museum of the Year award 2021 and received a special commendation from the European Museum Forum in 2023.

The Royal Armouries Museum, the United Kingdom's national collection of arms and armour, opened in 1996 in a dramatic modern building when this part of the collection was transferred from the Tower of London. It is located a short distance from the city centre at Leeds Dock. It is also one of the largest collections of arms and armour in the world, comprising the UK's National Collection of Arms and Armour, National Artillery Collection, and National Firearms Collection. Thwaite Mills Watermill Museum is a fully restored 1820s water-powered mill on the River Aire to the east of the city centre. Nearby is the Leeds Museum Discovery Centre (formerly housed at the Leeds Museum Resource Centre in Yeadon), the major storage of items not currently on display in museums, and open to the public by appointment.

=== Universities and colleges ===
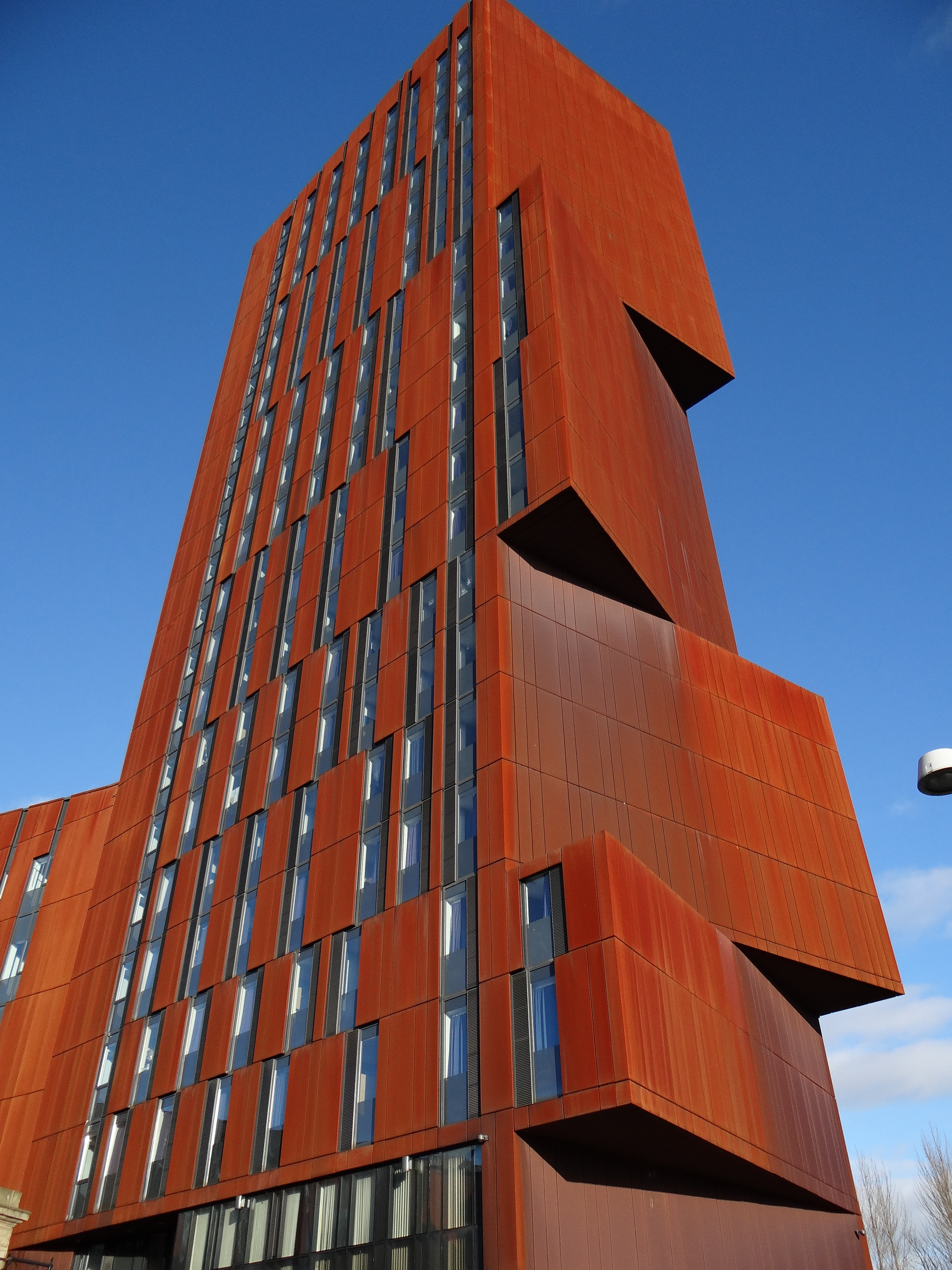
Broadcasting Tower at Leeds Beckett University

The city is served by five universities. It has the UK's fourth-largest student population and the country's fourth-largest urban economy. Institutions providing higher education include:

- The University of Leeds, which received its charter in 1904 having developed from the Yorkshire College which was founded in 1874 and the Leeds School of Medicine of 1831;
- Leeds Beckett University, formerly Leeds Polytechnic, which became a university in 1992 as Leeds Metropolitan University, and can trace its roots to the Mechanics' Institute of 1824;
- Leeds Trinity University, which began in 1966 as two teacher training colleges which merged in 1980 to form Trinity and All Saints College and became a university in 2012;
- Leeds Arts University, formerly Leeds College of Art, which was founded in 1846 as the Leeds School of Art, and became a university in 2017;
- The University of Law, formerly the College of Law, which became a university in 2012 and moved to its current Leeds city centre campus from York in 2014;
- Leeds Conservatoire;
- Northern School of Contemporary Dance;
- University Centre Leeds, part of Leeds City College.

The University of Leeds has about 31,000 students, of which 21,500 are full-time or sandwich undergraduate degree students, Leeds Beckett University has 25,805 students of which 12,000 are full-time or sandwich undergraduate degree students and 2,100 full-time or sandwich HND students. Leeds Trinity University has just under 3,000 students. The city was voted the best UK university destination by a survey in The Independent newspaper.

Further education in Leeds is provided by Elliott Hudson College, Leeds City College (formed by a merger in 2009 and having over 60,000 students), Leeds College of Building, University Technical College (UTC) Leeds, Notre Dame Catholic Sixth Form College, and Leeds Mathematics School.

== Culture and community ==
In 2018, Leeds embarked on a five-year cultural investment programme, culminating in a year of cultural celebration in 2023. In 2023, the city hosted Leeds 2023, an international cultural festival.

=== Art ===
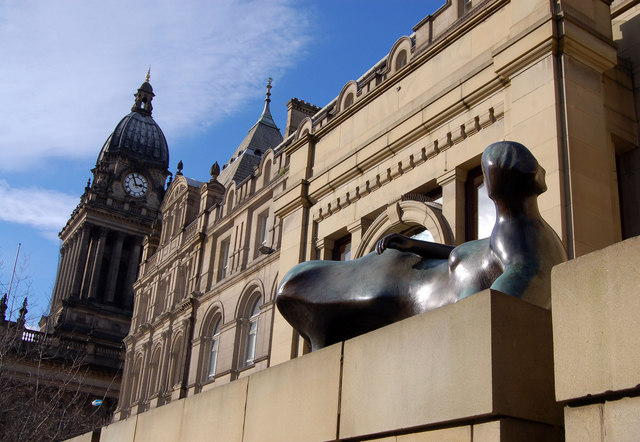
Henry Moore Statue outside Leeds Art Gallery

Leeds Art Gallery, which opened in 1888, houses the best twentieth century collection outside London and a colourful wall painting for the Victorian staircase by Lothar Götz. The gallery is owned and operated by Leeds City Council and is free to members of the public. Just next door, The Henry Moore Institute hosts a year-round programme of historical, modern and contemporary exhibitions presenting sculpture from across the world.

Located in the art deco headquarters of the former brewery, The Tetley was a centre for contemporary art; it closed in 2023. The Gallery at 164 is an independent art gallery exhibiting artists, illustrators, photographers and designers working in all types of media.

The Stanley & Audrey Burton Gallery offers art exhibitions from the University Art Collection and Treasures of the Brotherton Gallery. Art is taught in Leeds at Leeds College of Art which has alumni including Henry Moore and Damien Hirst. Leeds city centre has a variety of statues and sculptures on public display. The city also features an ever-growing host of street art and urban murals, including the UK's tallest mural 'Athena Rising'. This mural is part of a city-wide project 'A City Less Grey', initiated by East Street Arts, which won a national award at the Planning Awards 2018.

==== Public art ====
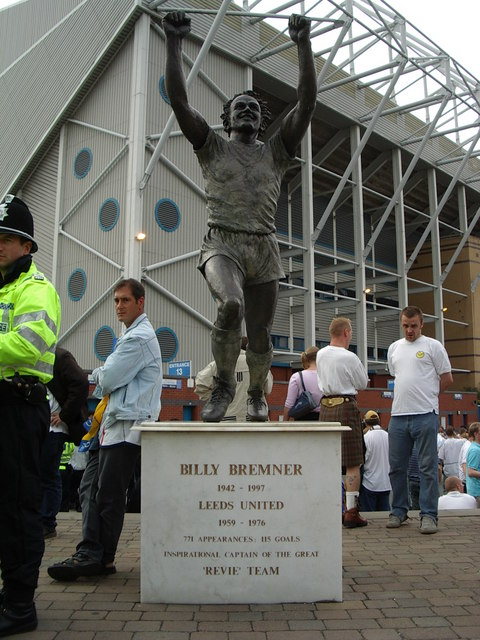
Statue of footballer Billy Bremner at Elland Road Stadium

The city has a number of public artworks ranging from traditional statues to contemporary work. These include several works by Alfred Drury and one of Joseph Beuys 7000 Oaks. Two bronze statues stand at Elland Road Stadium celebrating former manager Don Revie and team captain Billy Bremner.

=== Events ===
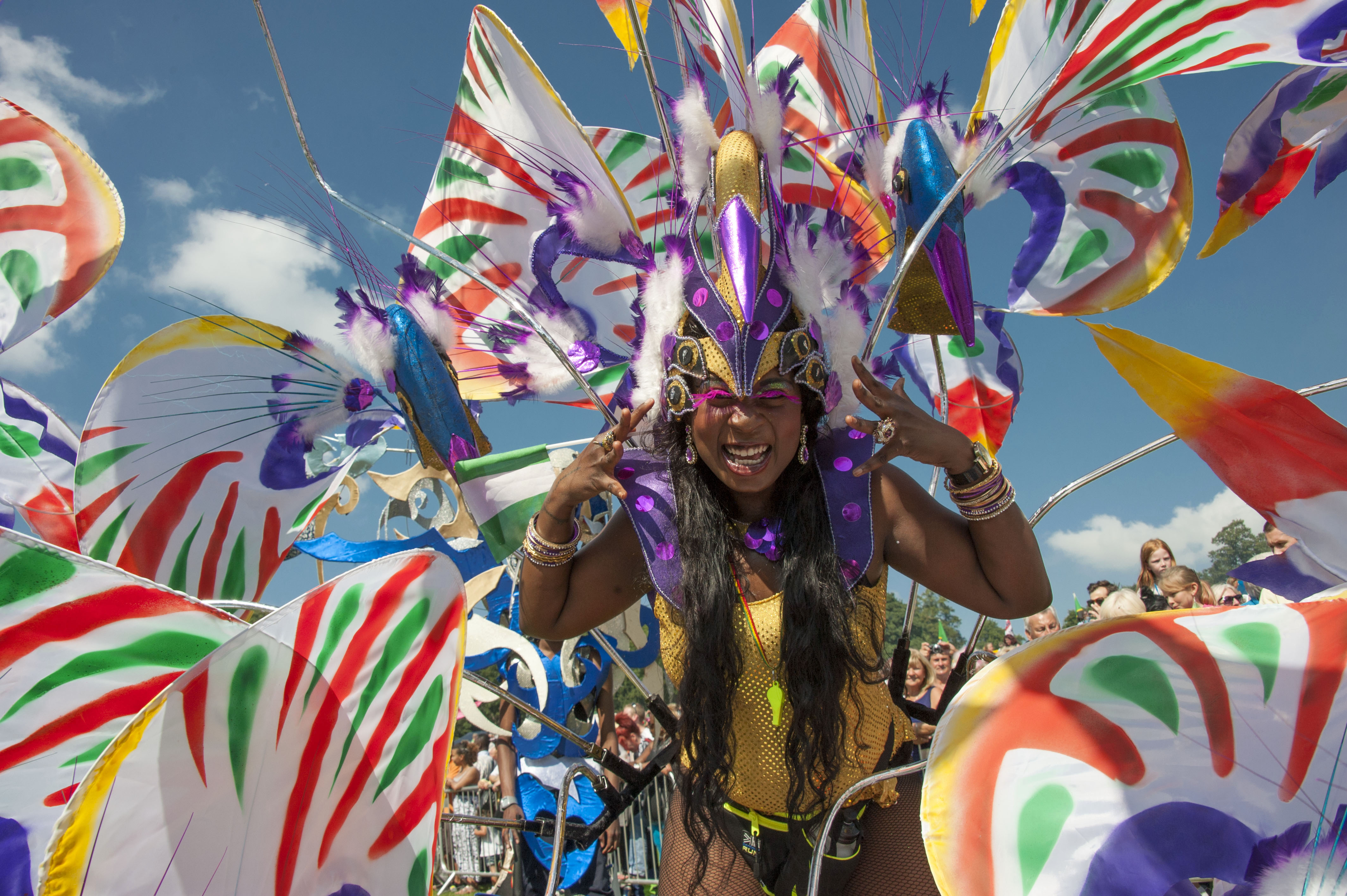
Leeds West Indian Carnival

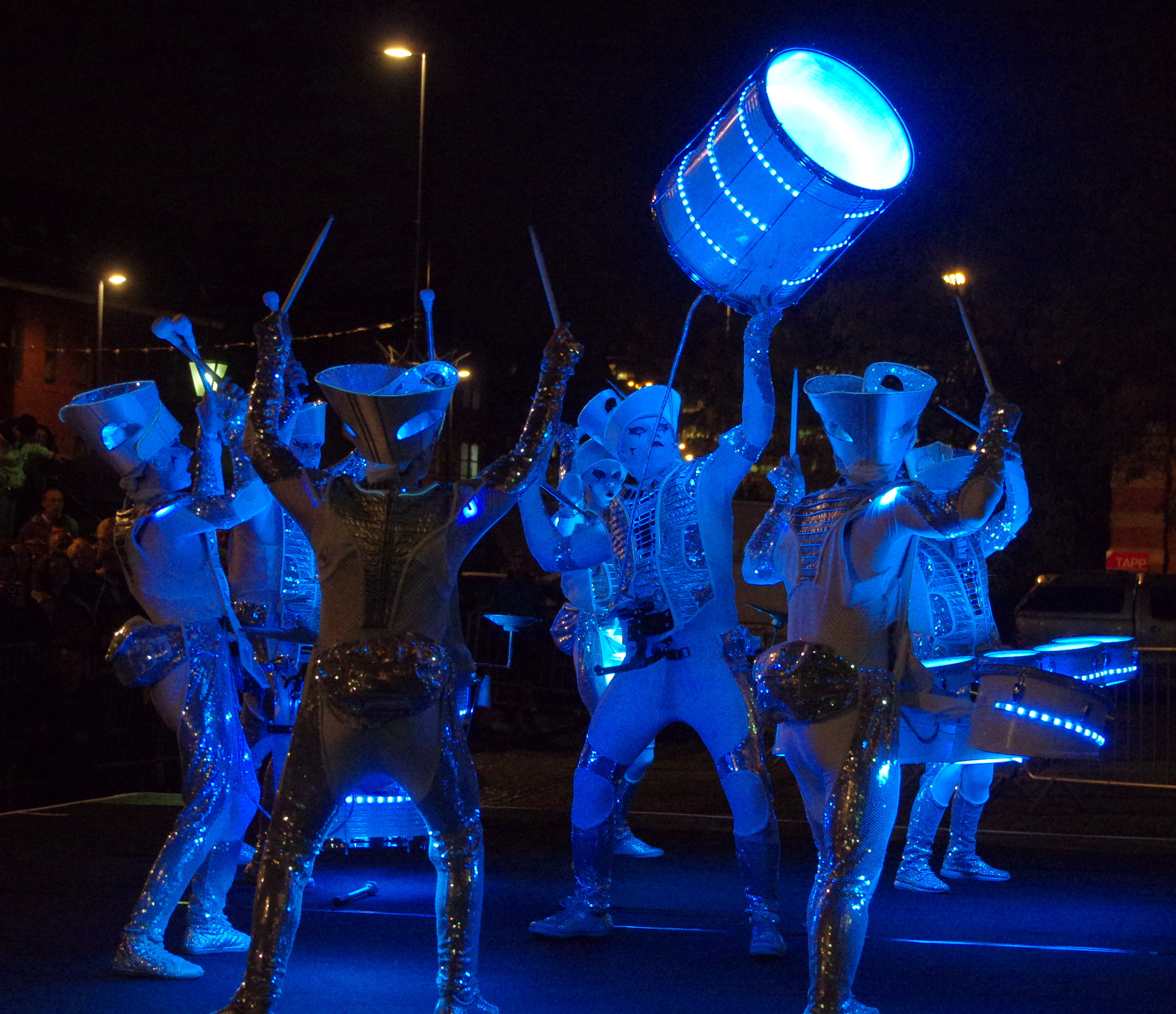
Light Night, one of the UK's largest annual arts and light festivals

Leeds West Indian Carnival is Western Europe's oldest West Indian Carnival, and the UK's third-largest after the Notting Hill and Nottingham Carnival. It attracts around 100,000 people over 2 days to the streets of Chapeltown and Harehills. There is a large procession that finishes at Potternewton Park, where there are stalls, entertainment and refreshments. The Leeds Festival, featuring some of the biggest names in rock and indie music, takes place every year in Bramham Park. The Leeds Asian Festival, formerly the Leeds Mela, is held in Roundhay Park. The Otley Folk Festival (patron: Nic Jones), Walking Festival, Carnival, and Victorian Christmas Fayre are annual events. Light Night Leeds takes place each October, and many venues in the city are open to the public for Heritage Open Days in September. The Leeds International Pianoforte Competition, established in 1963 by Fanny Waterman and Marion Stein, has been held in the city every three years since 1963 and has launched the careers of many major concert pianists. The Leeds International Concert Season, which includes orchestral and choral concerts in Leeds Town Hall and other events, is the largest local authority music programme in the UK.

The Leeds International Film Festival is the largest film festival in England outside London and shows films from around the world. It incorporates the highly successful Leeds Young People's Film Festival, which features exciting and innovative films made both for and by children and young people. Garforth is host to the fortnight-long festival The Garforth Arts Festival which has been an annual event since 2005. The Chapel Allerton Arts Festival is a week-long music and arts event starting in 1998 and held the week after August Bank Holiday each year. The Leeds Festival Fringe is a week long-music festival created in 2010 to showcase local talent in the week prior to Leeds Festival.

Light Night, one of the UK's largest annual arts and light festivals, takes place in the first week of October, turning the entire city into an art installation with light shows, projections, installations and lots more. Leeds Pride is an annual LGBT+ festival held since 2006 supported by the city council and local business. In 2018 attendance was 40,000 with over 100 floats and benefits the city by over £3.8 million. The city has a sponsorship scheme for its 15 Rainbow Plaques commemorating places and events that are of significance to the LGBT+ community organised through Leeds Civic Trust. Other festivals include Transform and Thought Bubble.

=== Film ===
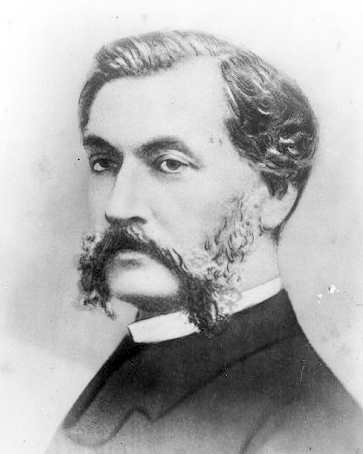
Louis Le Prince

In October 1888, Louis Le Prince filmed moving picture sequences Roundhay Garden Scene and a Leeds Bridge street scene using his single-lens camera and Eastman's paper film. These were several years before the work of competing inventors such as Auguste and Louis Lumière and Thomas Edison. Today, Leeds International Film Festival's International Short Film Competition is named after Louis Le Prince. The 2015 documentary film The First Film, which first aired at the Edinburgh International Film Festival, documents Le Prince's pioneering status.

Wordsworth Donisthorpe who was also from Leeds, filmed the second-oldest-surviving film. It is not known if he and Louis Le Prince ever met but they both had a strong connection to the Leeds Philosophical and Literary Society. Donisthorpe's patent for a camera to capture the moving image pre dated Le Prince's by twelve years.

Leeds has a rich film exhibition culture. In addition to the Leeds International Film Festival and Leeds Young Film Festival, the city hosts numerous independent cinemas and pop-up venues for film screenings. The Cottage Road Cinema and Hyde Park Picture House have continuously been showing films since 1912 and 1914, respectively, which ranks them among the oldest still-running cinemas in the UK.

=== Literature ===
Leeds has produced many writers of note, including celebrated author and playwright Alan Bennett. J. R. R. Tolkien, author of The Lord of the Rings, lived and taught in Leeds from 1921 to 1925. Author Joanne Harris was a teacher at Leeds Grammar School for 15 years, and based several of her novels on her experiences there. In 2019 and 2020, Leeds hosted the Leeds Lit Fest, a "non-traditional" literature festival, incorporating talks, panels, and workshops. There are plans to create a National Poetry Centre in Leeds.

Notable libraries in Leeds are:

- Leeds Central Library, a public library on Calverley Street, is near the city's municipal buildings.
- Leeds Library, a private subscription library on Commercial Street, is the oldest surviving library of this kind in the UK.
- A Boston Spa collection of The British Library, a national research library, includes the library's newspaper archive of over 20 million items.
- A city centre library by The British Library is planned to open as of 2020 at a later date.

=== Parks and open spaces ===
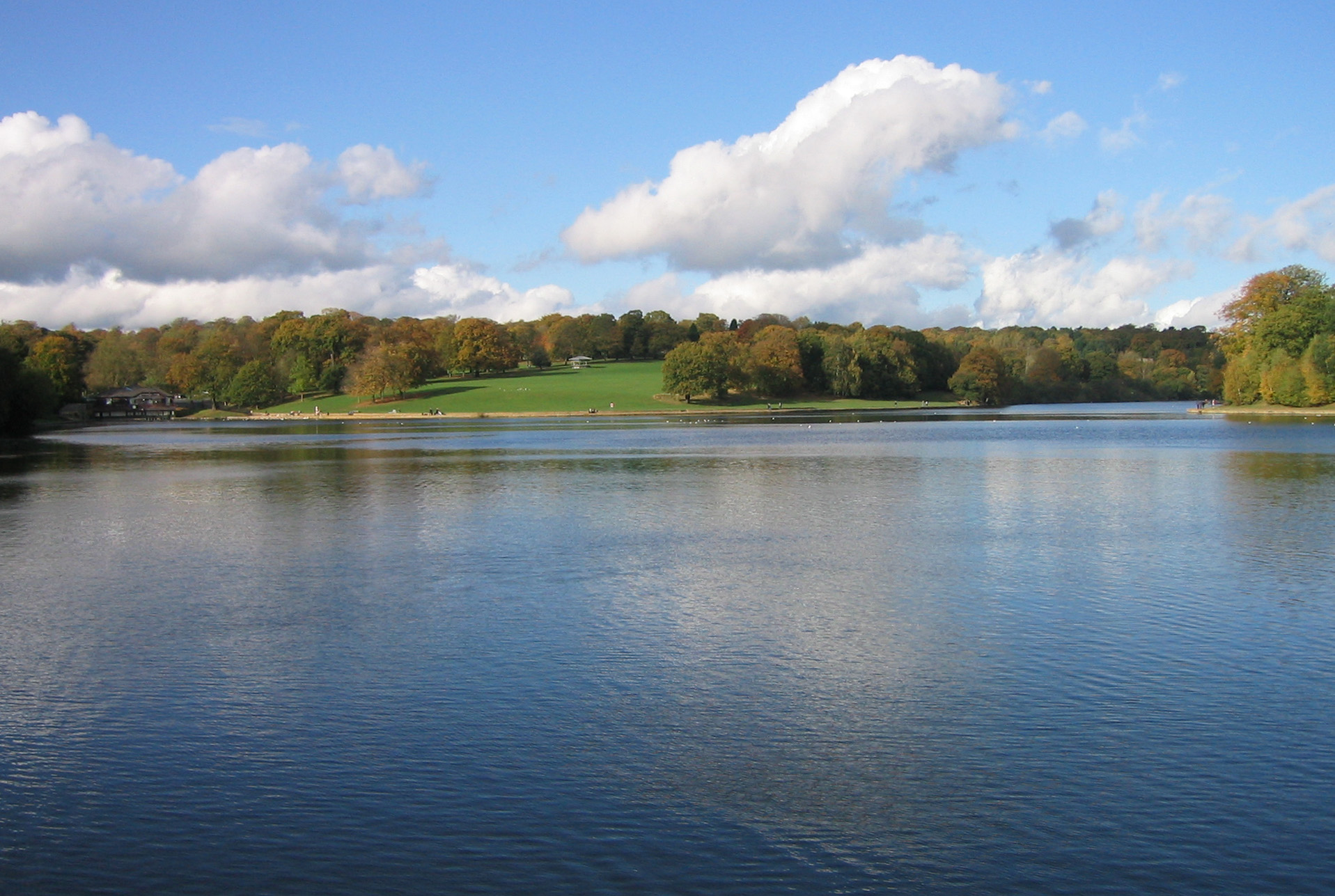
Waterloo Lake in Roundhay Park, one of the largest urban parks in Europe

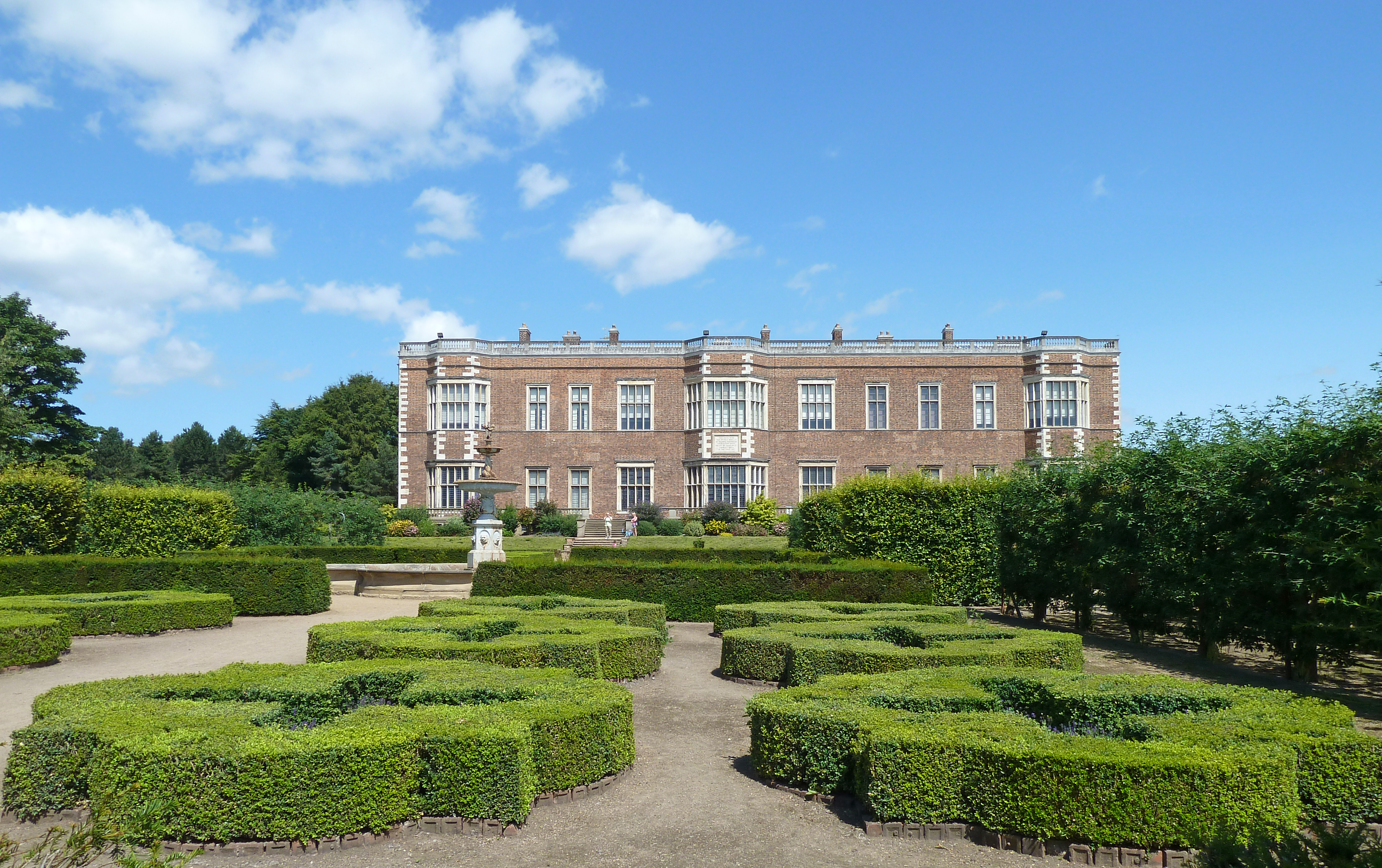
The mansion and garden at Temple Newsam

Leeds has many large parks and open spaces. Roundhay Park is the largest park in the city and is one of the largest city parks in Europe. The park has more than 700 acres (2.8 km^{2}) of parkland, lakes, woodland and gardens which are all owned by Leeds City Council.

Other parks in the city include: Beckett Park, Bramley Fall Park, Cross Flatts Park, East End Park, Golden Acre Park, Gotts Park, the gardens and grounds of Harewood House, Horforth Hall Park, Meanwood Park, Middleton Park, Potternewton Park, Pudsey Park, Temple Newsam, Western Flatts Park and Woodhouse Moor. There are many more smaller parks and open spaces scattered around the city, which make up around 21.7% of the city's total area. A 2017 survey ranked Leeds 7th among the ten largest UK cities (by population) for the amount of green space, although published comments on the survey pointed out major inconsistencies in the city boundaries used.

As part of the South Bank regeneration project, plans are in development for Aire Park, a new 3.5 hectare city centre park located close to the former Tetley Brewery site. Planning permission for the first phase to be undertaken by Vastint UK was granted in December 2018. In 2023, the Monk Bridge viaduct was restored by a developer and subsequently opened as the Monk Bridge Viaduct Garden.

=== Live music ===
Leeds is home to the refurbished Grand Theatre where the only national opera company outside London, Opera North, is based. The City Varieties Music Hall is one of the UK's few remaining music halls, and famously hosted performances by Charlie Chaplin and Harry Houdini. It was also the venue of the BBC television programme The Good Old Days. The newest theatre, containing two auditoriums, is the Leeds Playhouse, which had formerly been known as the West Yorkshire Playhouse. Just south of Leeds Bridge once stood The Theatre which hosted Sarah Siddons and Ching Lau Lauro in 1786 and 1834, respectively.

There are a number of independent venues in Leeds that host live music. For example, the Brudenell Social Club is one of the most popular indie venues in the UK.

The First Direct Arena is a 13,500-seater stadium that opened in September 2013, and used for live music events. Concerts are also held at the O2 Academy, Elland Road, which has hosted groups such as Queen and Kaiser Chiefs, among others and at the universities. Roundhay Park in north Leeds has seen some of the world's biggest artists including Michael Jackson, Madonna, Bruce Springsteen, and Robbie Williams.

Leeds is also home to Phoenix Dance Theatre, who were formed in the Harehills area of the city in 1981, and Northern Ballet Theatre. In autumn 2010 the two companies moved into a purpose-built dance centre which is the largest space for dance outside London. It is also the only space for dance to house a national classical and a national contemporary dance company alongside each another.

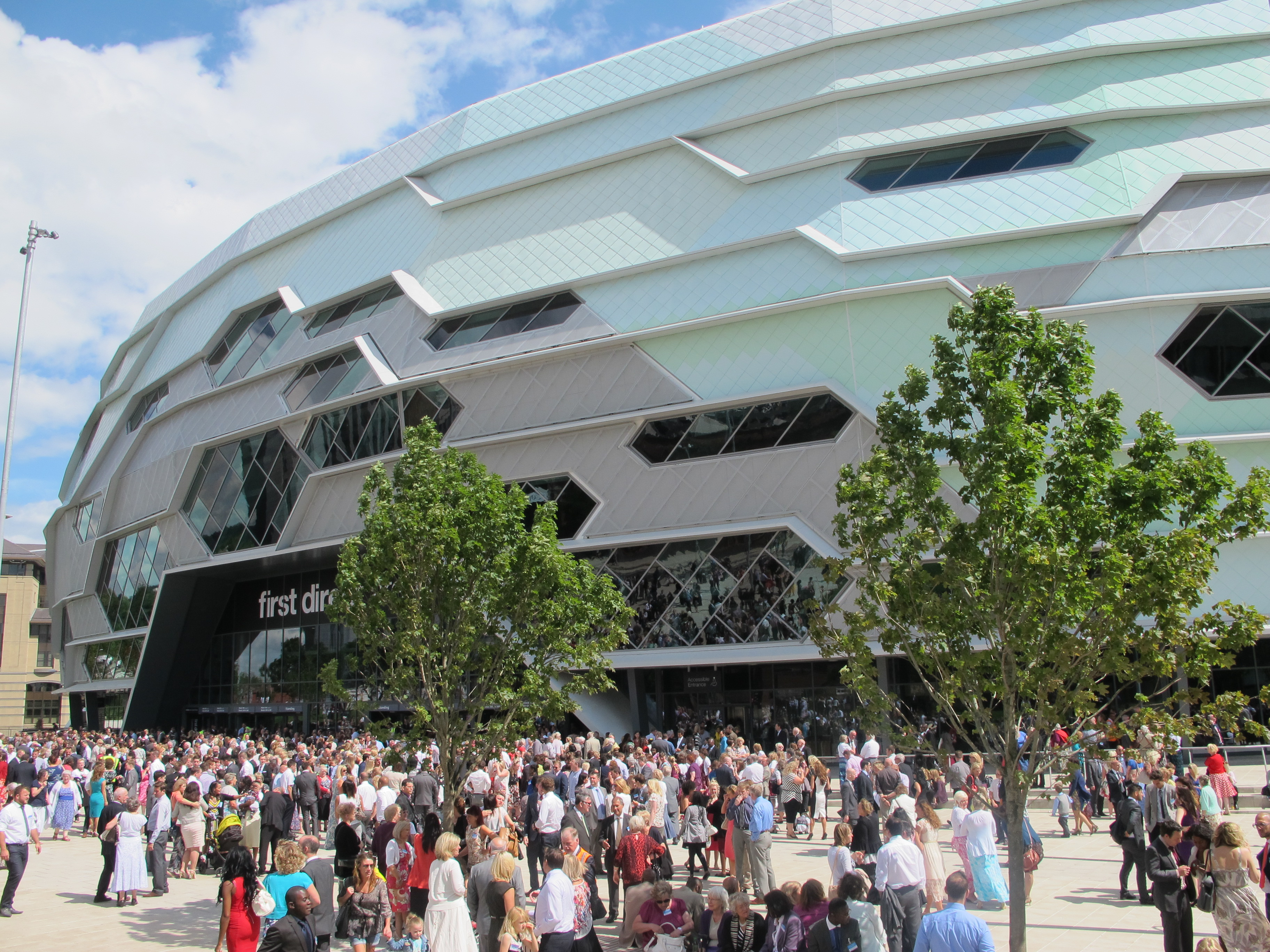
The Leeds Arena building was named the "best new venue in the world" in 2014 by the Stadium Business Awards.

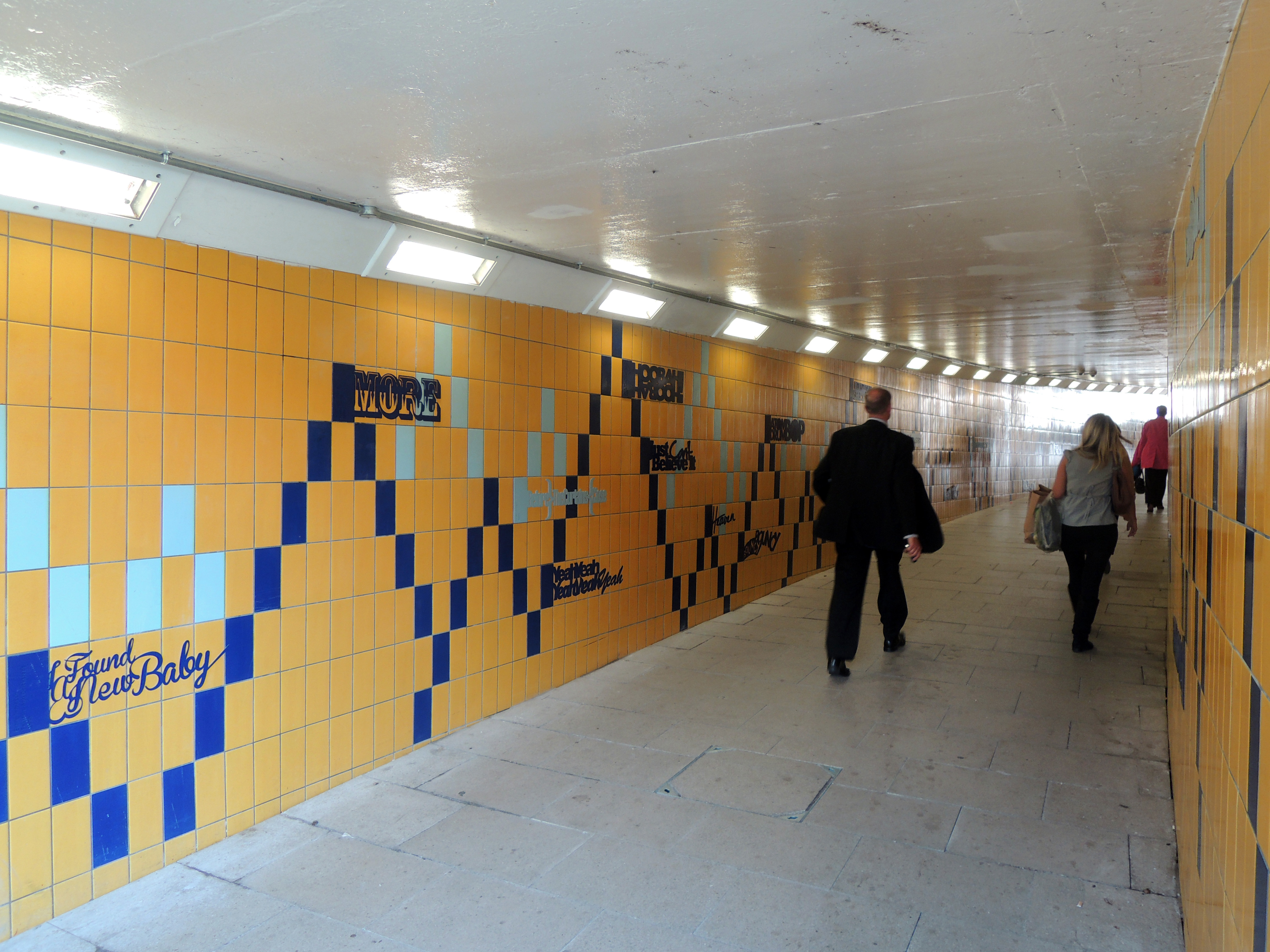
Leeds Song Tunnel public art celebrating the music of the city

Popular musical acts originating from Leeds include Soft Cell, Kaiser Chiefs, the Pigeon Detectives, the Wedding Present, the Sunshine Underground, the Sisters of Mercy, Hadouken!, Corinne Bailey Rae, Dinosaur Pile-Up, Yard Act, Pulled Apart by Horses, Gang of Four, Hood, the Rhythm Sisters, Utah Saints, Alt-J, and Melanie B of the Spice Girls. A public artwork by Adrian Riley called 'Leeds Song Tunnel' celebrates bands and musical artists who have their origins in Leeds.

On Valentine's Day 1970, the Who performed and recorded their album Live at Leeds at the University of Leeds Refectory. Since its initial reception, Live at Leeds has been cited by several music critics as the best live rock recording of all time.

Pink Floyd's popular second single "See Emily Play" was written in Leeds in 1967 after a gig in the old Leeds City College Technology Campus, then known as Kitson College. Leeds is the only city outside of London to have its own repertory theatre, ballet, and opera companies.

=== Nightlife ===
Leeds is Purple Flag accredited to indicate an entertaining, diverse, safe and enjoyable night. Leeds has the fourth largest student population in the country (over 200,000), and is therefore one of the UK's hotspots for night-life. There are a large number of pubs, bars, nightclubs and restaurants, as well as a multitude of venues for live music. It includes the original home of the famous club nights Back 2 Basics, Speedqueen and Vague. Morley was the location of techno club The Orbit.

The F Club was a club night that ran in Leeds between 1977 and 1982 and specialised in punk rock and post-punk. It would prove highly influential to the development of the goth subculture, due to it leading to the formation of seminal gothic rock bands like The Sisters of Mercy, The March Violets, and Southern Death Cult. The now-defunct club Le Phonographique was located in the Merrion Centre and was the first gothic nightclub in the world.

Leeds has a well established LGBT+ nightlife scene, predominantly located in the Freedom Quarter on Lower Briggate. The New Penny is one of the UK's longest running LGBT+ venues, and Leeds' oldest gay bar. Towards Millennium Square is a growing entertainment district providing for both students and weekend visitors. Millennium Square is a venue for large seasonal events such as a Christmas market, gigs and concerts, and citywide parties. It is adjacent to the Mandela Gardens, which were opened by Nelson Mandela in 2001. Leeds also hosts an annual Leeds International Beer Festival, held at Leeds Town Hall every September.

== Media ==
Leeds has a diverse media landscape and is considered a media hub. Yorkshire Post Newspapers Ltd, owned by National World, is based in the city, and produces a daily morning broadsheet, The Yorkshire Post, and an evening paper, the Yorkshire Evening Post (YEP). The YEP has a website which includes a series of community pages which focus on specific areas of the city. The Wetherby News covers mainly areas within the north eastern sector of the district, and the Wharfedale & Airedale Observer, published in Ilkley, covers the north-west, both appearing weekly. The two largest universities both have student newspapers, the weekly Leeds Student from the University of Leeds and the monthly The Met from Leeds Beckett University. The Leeds Guide was a fortnightly listings magazine, which was established in 1997 and ceased publication in 2012. Free publications include the Leeds Weekly News, produced by Yorkshire Post Newspapers in four geographic versions and distributed to households in the main urban area of the city, and the regional version of Metro, which is distributed on buses and at railway stations.

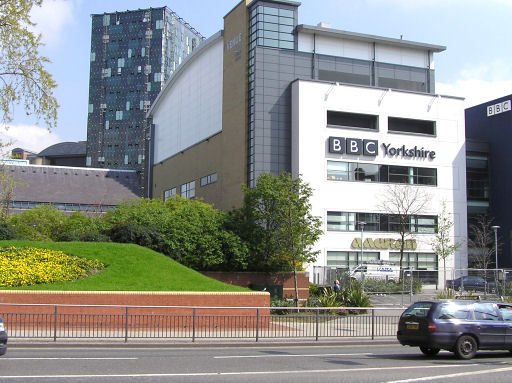
BBC Yorkshire studios

BBC Television and ITV both have regional studios and broadcasting centres in Leeds, while Channel 4 opened a new headquarters at the Majestic in 2020. ITV Yorkshire, formerly Yorkshire Television, broadcasts from the Leeds Studios on Kirkstall Road. There are a number of independent film production companies, including the not-for-profit cooperative Leeds Animation Workshop, founded in 1978; community video producers Vera Media and several small commercial production companies. BBC Radio Leeds, Hits Radio West Yorkshire, Greatest Hits Radio West Yorkshire, Capital Yorkshire, and Heart Yorkshire broadcast from the city. LSRfm.com is based in Leeds University Union, and regularly hosts outside broadcasts around the city. Many communities within Leeds now have their own local radio stations, such as East Leeds FM and Tempo FM for Wetherby and the surrounding areas.

Leeds has a local television station called Leeds TV which is required to broadcast 37 hours a week of first-run local programming. The station had launched in 2014 as Made in Leeds which launched across the city in 2014.

== Sport ==
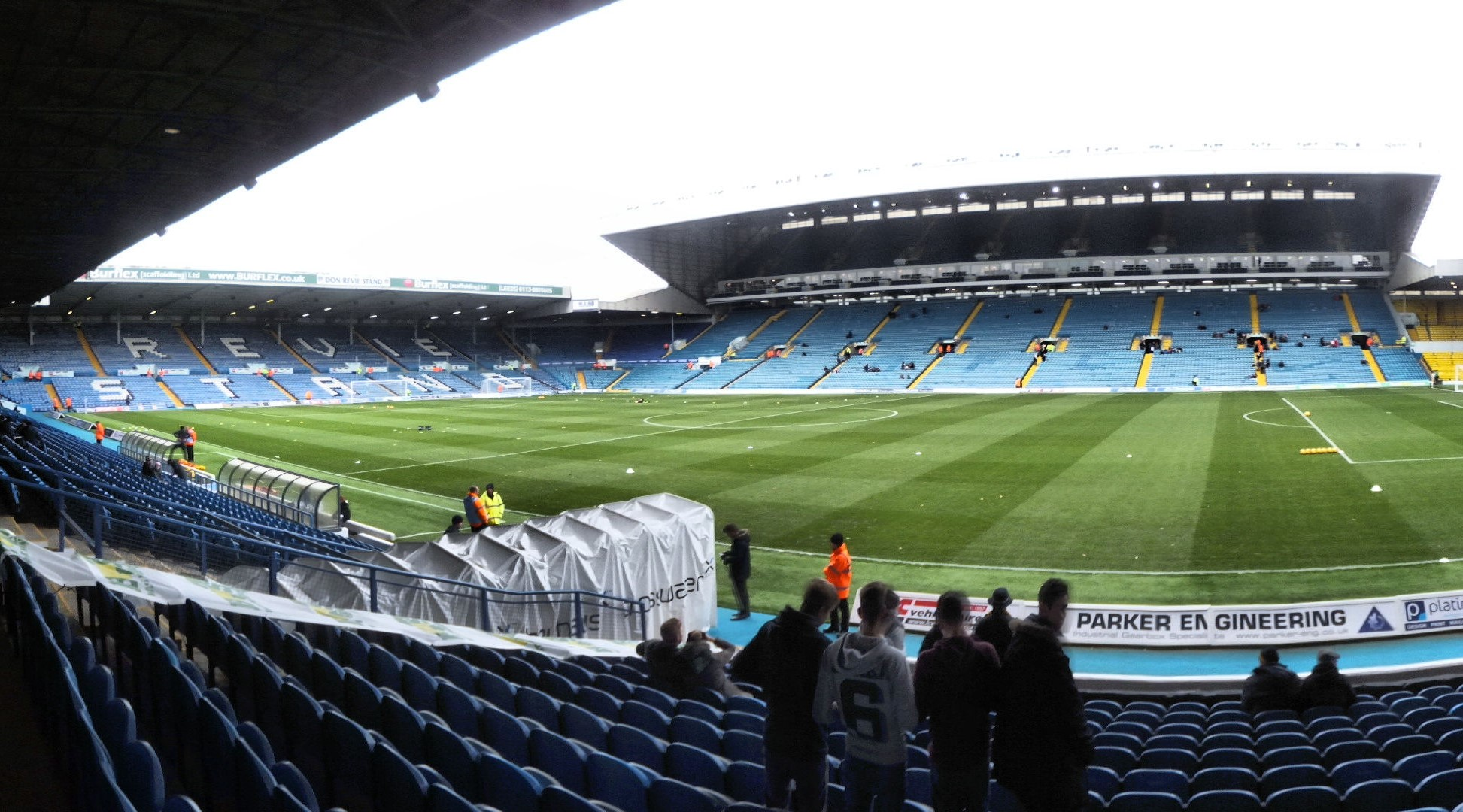
Elland Road Stadium

The city has teams representing all the major national sports. Leeds United F.C. is the city's main football club, and additional clubs include Guiseley AFC, Farsley Celtic, and Garforth Town. Leeds United was formed in 1919 and plays at the 37,890-capacity Elland Road Stadium in Beeston. The team rejoined the Premier League, following a sixteen-year stint in lower divisions, after they won promotion by winning the EFL Championship in 2019–20, but in the Premier League Season of 2022–23 they got relegated to the Championship again. After winning the 2024–25 Championship League, they have once again been promoted to the Premier League.

Guiseley was formed in 1909 and plays at the 4,000 capacity Nethermoor Park Stadium in Guiseley; the team plays in the Northern Premier League. Farsley Celtic was formed in 1908 and plays in the National League North and their stadium is Throstle Nest. Garforth Town was formed in 1964 and plays in the Northern Counties East League Premier Division; their stadium is Wheatley Park.

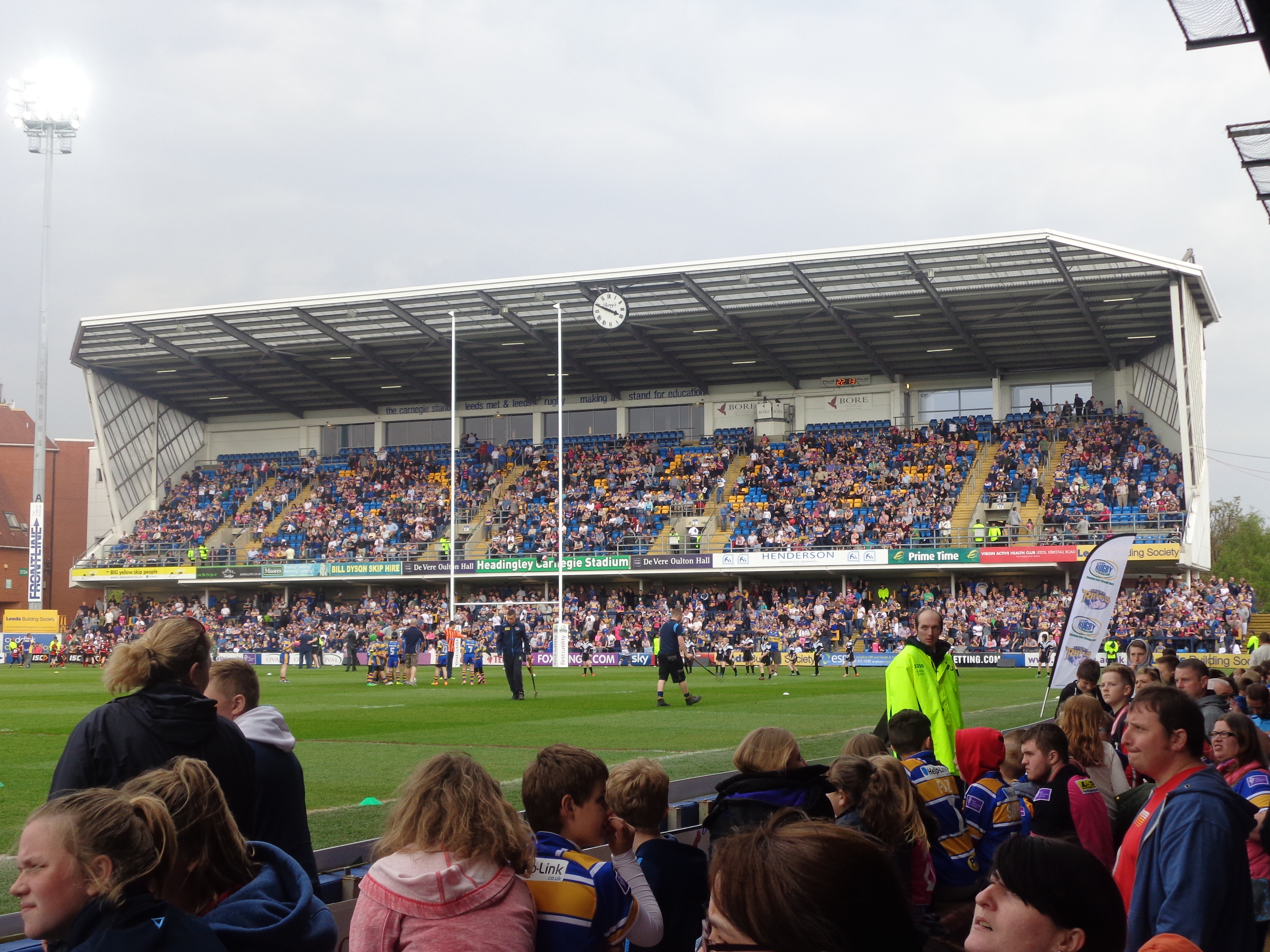
Headingley Stadium, home of the Leeds Rhinos

Leeds Rhinos are the most successful rugby league team in Leeds. In 2009, they became first club to be Super League champions three seasons running, giving them their fourth Super League title. They play their home games at the Headingley Rugby Stadium. Hunslet, based at the John Charles Centre for Sport, play in the Co-Operative Championship One. East Leeds and Oulton Raiders play in the National Conference League. Bramley Buffaloes (previously Bramley), and Leeds Akkies were members of the Rugby League Conference.

Leeds Tykes were the foremost rugby union team in Leeds and they previously also played at Headingley. They play in National League 1 having been relegated from RFU Championship at the end of the 2019–20 season. Otley RUFC are a rugby union club based to the north of the city and compete in National League 2 North, whilst Morley RFC, located in Morley currently play in National Division Three North.

Headingley Cricket Stadium is home to Yorkshire County Cricket Club which is the most successful cricket team in England, with 33 County Championship wins (including one shared). Their main rivals are Lancashire. Leeds City Athletic Club competes in the British Athletics League and UK Women's League as well as the Northern Athletics League.

Leeds is home to a number of field hockey clubs that compete in the Men's England Hockey League, the Women's England Hockey League, the North Hockey League, the Yorkshire Hockey Association League and the BUCS leagues. These include Leeds Hockey Club, Leeds Adel Carnegie Hockey Club, the University of Leeds Hockey Club, and Leeds Beckett University Hockey Club.

The City of Leeds Synchronised Swimming Club train at the John Charles Centre for Sport and are represented by swimmers throughout the whole of the North East. The club was founded in 2008 and only compete in National and International Competition.

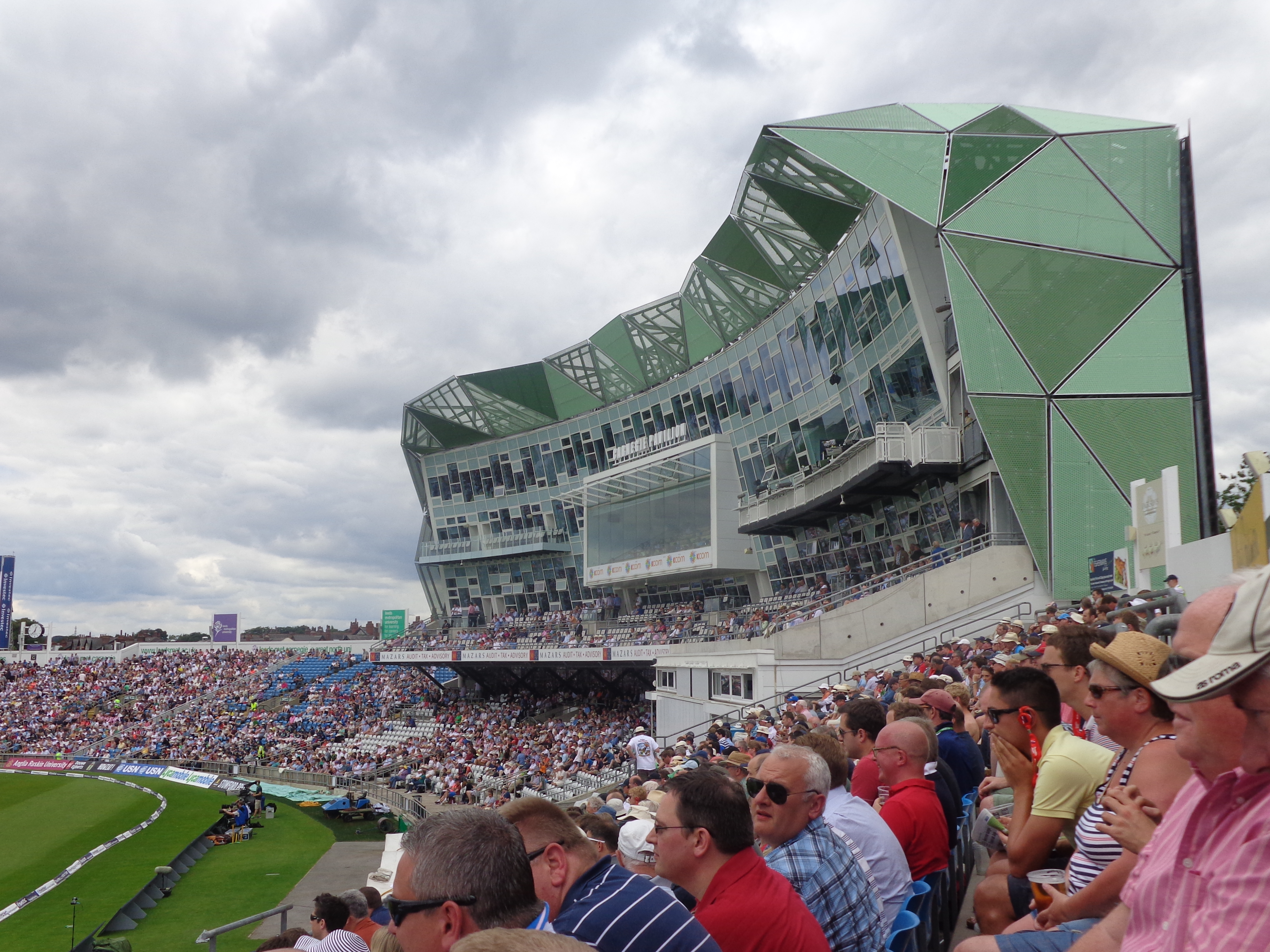
Carnegie Pavilion at Headingley Stadium

The city has a wealth of sports facilities including the Elland Road football stadium, a host stadium during the 1996 European Football Championship; the Headingley Carnegie Stadiums, adjacent stadia world-famous for both cricket and rugby league and the John Charles Centre for Sport with an Olympic-sized pool in its Aquatics Centre and includes a multi-use stadium. Other facilities include the Leeds Wall (climbing) and Yeadon Tarn sailing centre. In 1929 the first Ryder Cup of Golf to be held on British soil was competed for at Moortown Golf Club in Alwoodley, and Wetherby has a National Hunt racecourse. In the period 1928 to 1939 speedway racing was staged in Leeds on a track at the greyhound stadium known as Fullerton Park, adjacent to Elland Road. The track entered a team in the 1931 Northern league.

The 2014 Tour de France Grand Départ took place from the Headrow in Leeds city centre on 5 July 2014. Leeds is well known for its divers and features some of the best diving facilities in the UK. City of Leeds Diving Club, who train at the John Charles Centre for Sport, has trained many athletes who have competed at international and Olympic level, with Jack Laugher and Chris Mears making history by becoming the first ever divers from Great Britain to win an Olympic gold medal, a feat they accomplished at the 2016 Rio Olympics. Leeds has an ice hockey team, the Leeds Knights (formerly named Leeds Chiefs); they play at the Planet Ice Arena in Beeston, Leeds, in the National Ice Hockey League.

Leeds has a well-established climbing and mountaineering scene. The Yorkshire Ramblers' Club, England's second oldest mountaineering club, was founded in Headingley in 1892, and the city is also home to a number of other climbing clubs and venues. The UK's first artificial climbing wall for training and developing technique was established at the University of Leeds in 1964. Leeds has hosted the BMC's British Bouldering Championships, and the Youth Climbing Series Grand Final.

=== Teams ===
Club	Sport	League	Venue	Location	Formed	Top flight championships
Yorkshire CCC	Cricket	County Championship	Headingley Stadium	Headingley	1863	33
Leeds Rhinos	Rugby league	Super League	Headingley Stadium	Headingley	1870	11
Leeds United	Football	Premier League	Elland Road Stadium	Beeston	1919	3
Hunslet	Rugby league	League 1	John Charles Centre for Sport	Hunslet	1883	2
Guiseley	Football	Northern Premier League	Nethermoor Park	Guiseley	1909	0
Farsley Celtic	Football	National League North	Throstle Nest Stadium	Farsley	1908	0
Leeds Knights	Ice hockey	National Ice Hockey League	Planet Ice Leeds	Beeston	2019	0

== Religion ==
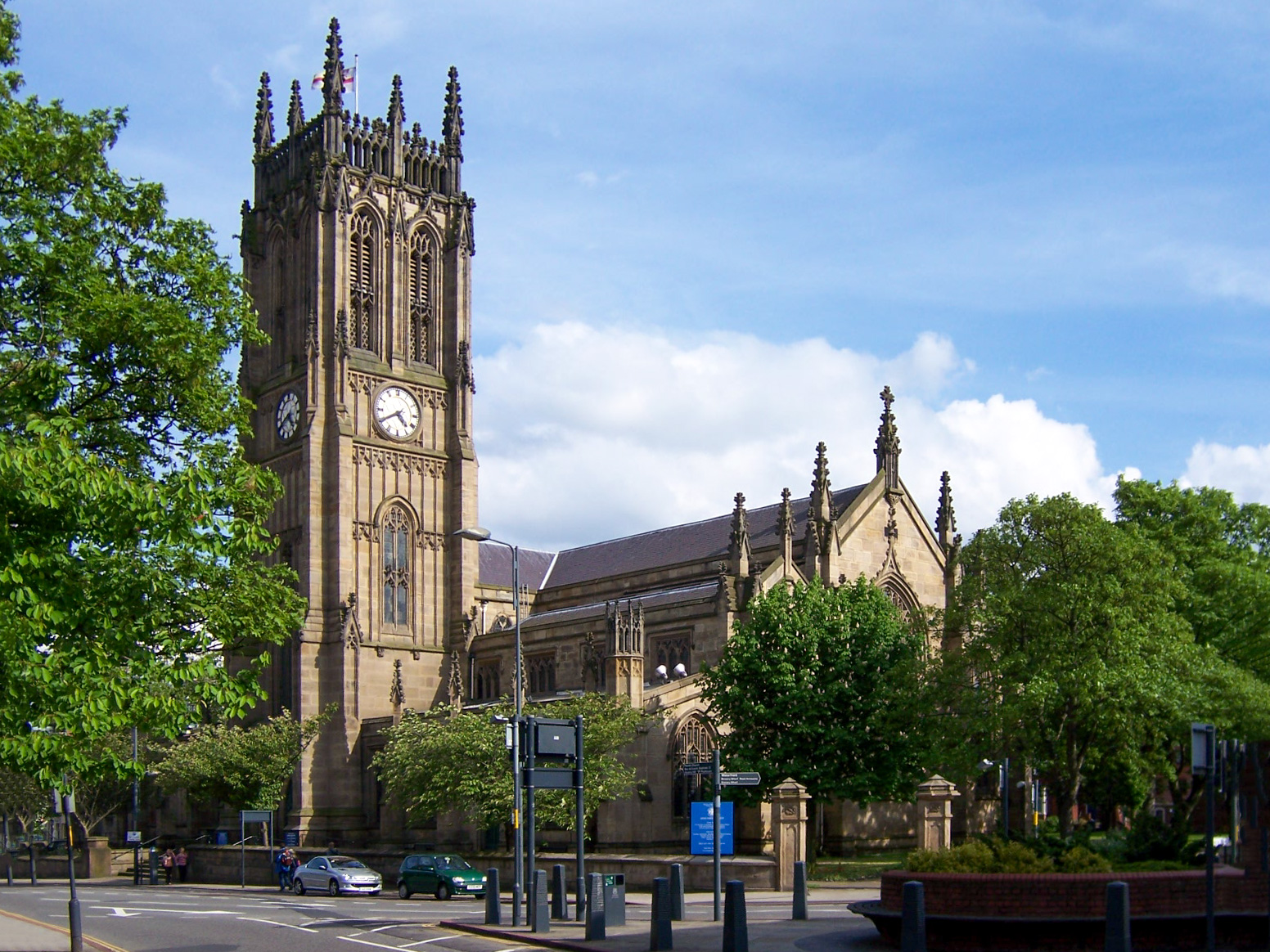
Leeds Minster has been designated a Grade I listed building by Historic England.

Religion in Leeds (2021)
1. Christianity (42.3%)
2. No religion (40.2%)
3. Islam (7.80%)
4. Sikhism (1.20%)
5. Hinduism (1.10%)
6. Judaism (0.80%)
7. Buddhism (0.40%)
8. Other religion (0.40%)
9. Not stated (5.80%)

The majority of people in Leeds identify themselves as Christians. Leeds does not have a Church of England cathedral: although it is in the Anglican Diocese of Leeds (formerly in the Diocese of Ripon and Leeds), headed by the Bishop of Leeds, the diocese has cathedrals in Bradford, Ripon, and Wakefield (although the Bishop's residence has been in Leeds since 2008). The most important Anglican church is Leeds Minster, although St. George's has the largest congregation by far.

Leeds has a Roman Catholic Cathedral, the episcopal seat of the Roman Catholic Diocese of Leeds. Many other Christian denominations and new religious movements are established in Leeds, including Assemblies of God, Baptist, Christian Scientist, the Church of Jesus Christ of Latter-day Saints, Community of Christ, Greek Orthodox, Jehovah's Witnesses, Jesus Army, Lutheran, Methodist, Moravian, Nazarene, Newfrontiers, Pentecostal, Salvation Army, Seventh-day Adventist, Society of Friends ("Quakers"), Unitarian, United Reformed, Vineyard, an ecumenical Chinese church, Winners' Chapel, and several independent churches.

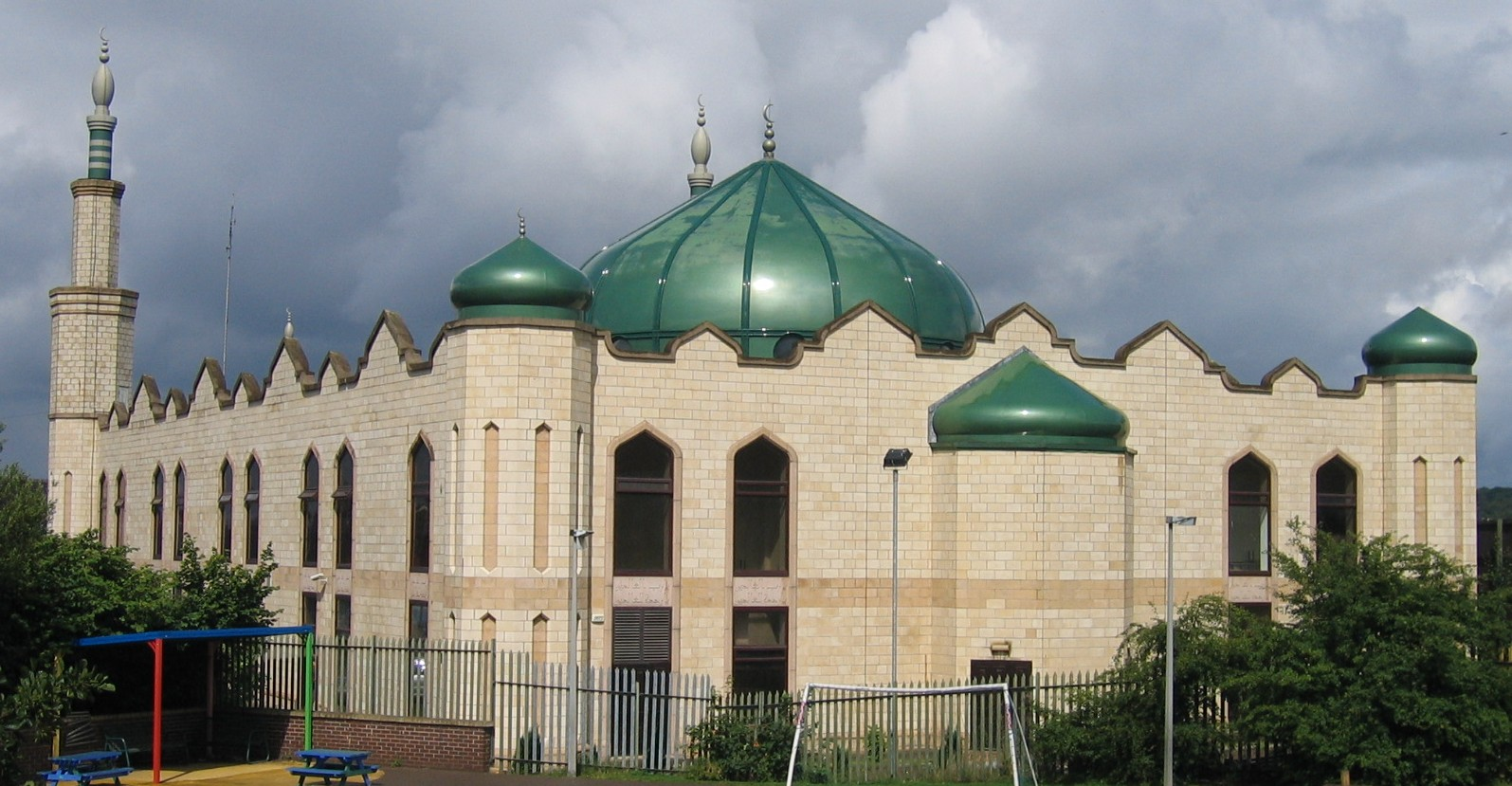
Harehills Mosque

The proportion of Muslims in Leeds is 7.8% as of 2021 (up from 5.4% in 2011), slightly above average for the country. Mosques can be found throughout the city, serving Muslim communities in Chapeltown, Harehills, Hyde Park and parts of Beeston. The largest mosque is Leeds Grand Mosque in Hyde Park.

The Sikh community is represented by gurdwaras (temples) spread across the city, the largest being in Chapeltown. There is also a colourful religious annual procession, called the Nagar Kirtan, into Millennium Square in the city centre on 13–14 April to celebrate Vaisakhi—the Sikh New Year and the birth of the religion. It is estimated that around 3,000 Sikhs in Leeds take part in this annual event.

The Jewish community of Leeds is the third-largest in the United Kingdom, after London and Greater Manchester. The areas of Alwoodley and Moortown contain sizeable Jewish populations. There are eight active synagogues in Leeds. The Hindu community in Leeds has a temple (mandir) at Hyde Park. The temple has all the major Hindu deities and is dedicated to the Lord Mahavira of the Jains.

Various Buddhist traditions are represented in Leeds, including: Soka Gakkai, Theravada, Tibetan, Triratna Buddhist Community, and Zen. The Buddhist community (sangha) comes together to celebrate the major festival of Wesak in May. There is also a community of the Baháʼí Faith in Leeds.

== Public services ==
Water supply and sewerage services in Leeds are provided by Yorkshire Water, part of the Kelda Group. Prior to 1973, water and sewerage services had been provided by the Leeds Corporation. Leeds City Council has a target of 11 MW of renewable energy from onshore wind by 2010 and an aspirational target of 75 MW by 2020. There are currently no operational wind farms in Leeds, but a planning application by Banks Renewables Ltd for five turbines at Hook Moor, near Micklefield, was approved in 2011.

The area is policed by the West Yorkshire Police. The force has five policing districts covering the West Yorkshire area, one of which covers Leeds. The Leeds District Headquarters is located at Elland Road in the south of the city. In the north-west of the city, the main stations are Weetwood and Woodhouse Lane; in the north-east, the main stations are Stainbeck near Chapel Allerton and Killingbeck; in the south the main stations are Leeds Central, located on Park Street in the city centre, and the District Headquarters itself. Fire and rescue services are provided by the West Yorkshire Fire and Rescue Service. The fire stations in Leeds are: Cookridge, Gipton, Hunslet, Stanks, Moortown, Stanningley, and the "Leeds" fire station (near the city centre, on Kirkstall Road).

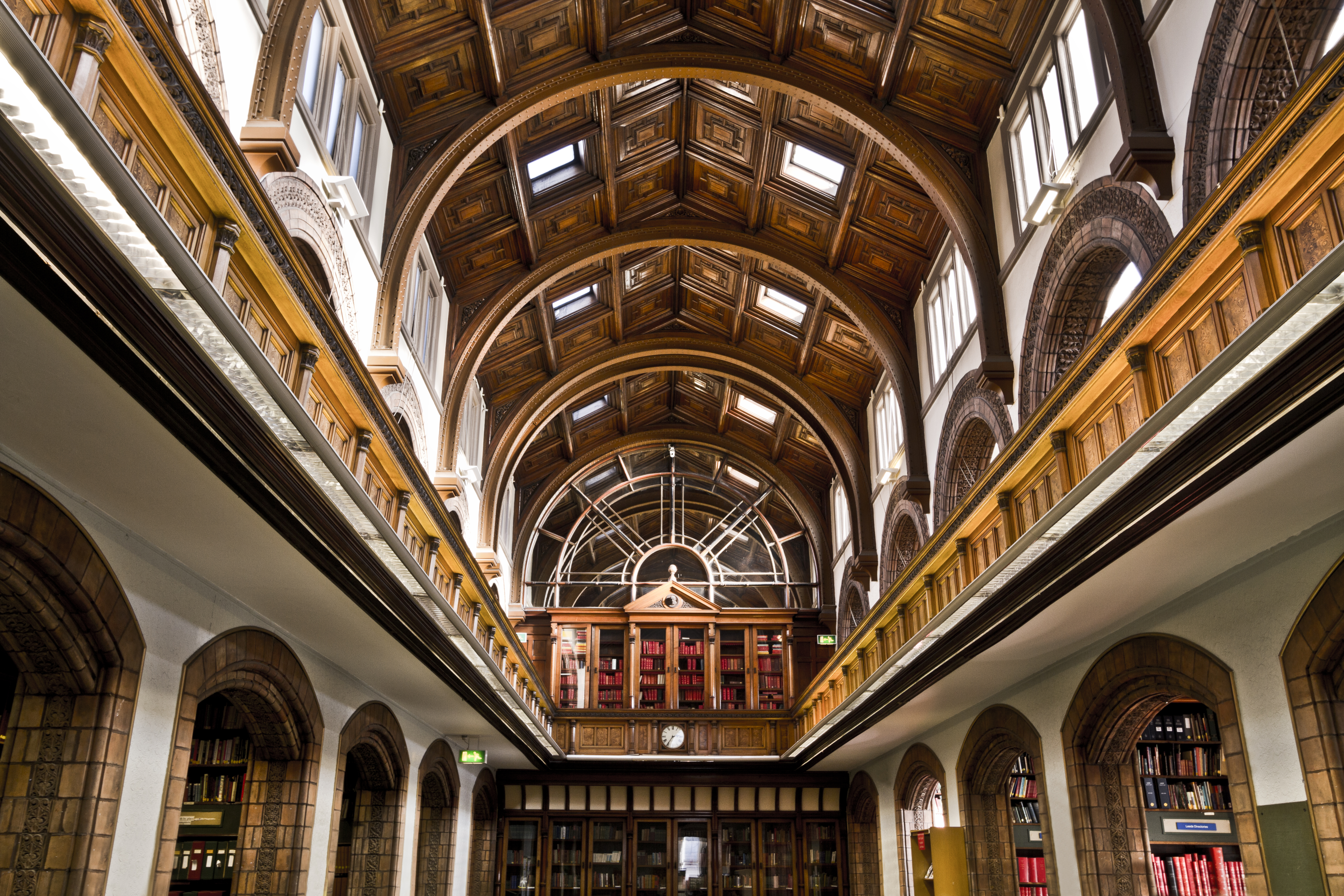
Leeds Central Library

NHS health services are provided by the Leeds Teaching Hospitals NHS Trust, Leeds Primary Care Trust, and Leeds and York Partnership NHS Foundation Trust, which provides mental health services. Leeds General Infirmary ("LGI") is a listed building with more recent additions and is in the city centre. St James's University Hospital, known locally as "Jimmy's", is to the north east of the city centre and is the largest teaching hospital in Europe. Other NHS hospitals are Chapel Allerton Hospital, Seacroft Hospital, Wharfedale Hospital in Otley, and Leeds Dental Institute.

West Yorkshire Joint Services provides analytical, archaeological, archives, ecology, materials testing, and trading standards services in Leeds and the other four districts of West Yorkshire. It was created following the abolition of the county council in 1986 and expanded in 1997, and is funded by the five district councils, pro rata to their population. The Leeds site of the archives service is in the former public library at Sheepscar, Leeds. Leeds City Council is responsible for over 50 public libraries across the whole city, including 5 mobile libraries. The main Central Library is located on the Headrow, in the city centre.

== Notable people ==
- List of people from Leeds

== Freedom of the City ==
The following people, military units and organisations and groups have received the Freedom of the City of Leeds.

=== Individuals ===
- Field Marshal Douglas Haig, 1st Earl Haig: 23 January 1920.
- Admiral of the Fleet David Beatty, 1st Earl Beatty: 18 October 1922.
- David Lloyd George: 21 October 1922.
- Edward Wood, 1st Earl of Halifax: 5 March 1923.
- Stanley Baldwin: 13 March 1925.
- H. H. Asquith: 13 March 1925.
- Berkeley Moynihan, 1st Baron Moynihan: 6 October 1926.
- Sir William Middlebrook: 6 October 1926.
- Sir Edward Brotherton: 6 October 1926.
- Philip Snowden, 1st Viscount Snowden: 11 September 1930.
- Arthur Greenwood: 11 September 1930.
- Mary, Princess Royal and Countess of Harewood: 7 July 1932.
- H. V. Evatt: 7 July 1943.
- Sir Winston Churchill: 28 October 1958.
- Major James Milner, 1st Baron Milner of Leeds: 1967.
- Nelson Mandela: 30 April 2001.
- Dame Fanny Waterman: April 2004.
- Jane Tomlinson : 20 May 2005.
- Alan Bennett: 12 March 2006.
- James Heselden: 26 January 2011. (Awarded posthumously)
- Beryl Burton: 12 September 2014. (Awarded posthumously)
- Rob Burrow: 20 December 2022
- Kevin Sinfield: 20 December 2022

=== Military units ===
- HMS Ark Royal, RN: 4 November 1941.
- RAF Church Fenton: 1971.
- HMS Ark Royal, RN: 25 October 1973.
- 5th Battalion The Rifles: 1 August 2009.
- 4th Battalion The Parachute Regiment: 9 December 2020.
- Leeds Rifles
- Leeds Pals
- 51st (2nd Yorkshire West Riding) Regiment of Foot
- Leeds Volunteer Corps, a volunteer regiment of the British Volunteer Corps during the Napoleonic Wars.

=== Organisations and Groups ===
- Leeds United FC 1967–74: 4 December 2019.

== See also ==
- Outline of Leeds

== Notes and references ==
=== Sources ===
- Burt, S.; Grady, K. (1994). The Illustrated History of Leeds. Breedon Books. ISBN 9781873626351.
- Fraser, Derek (1982). A History of Modern Leeds. Manchester University Press. ISBN 978-0-7190-0781-1.
- Unsworth and Stillwell (2004). Twenty-First Century Leeds: Geographies of a Regional City. Leeds: Leeds University Press. ISBN 0-85316-242-5.
