= Leeds War Memorial =

War memorial in Leeds, West Yorkshire, England

- East side of the memorial
- Interactive map of Leeds War Memorial
- 53°47′59″N 1°32′52″W
- Location: Victoria Square, The Headrow, Leeds

History
- Built: 1922 (statue replaced in 1992)

Site notes
- Architect: Henry Charles Fehr
- Sculptor: Henry Charles Fehr and Ian Judd (replacement)

Listed Building – Grade II
- Reference no.: 1255832

Leeds War Memorial stands on Victoria Square on the Headrow, to the east of Town Hall and to the south of Leeds City Art Gallery in Leeds, England. It was erected as a memorial to those who had fallen in the First World War. The memorial was designed by Henry Charles Fehr (1867–1940) and unveiled on 14 October 1922 by Viscount Lascelles.

== History ==
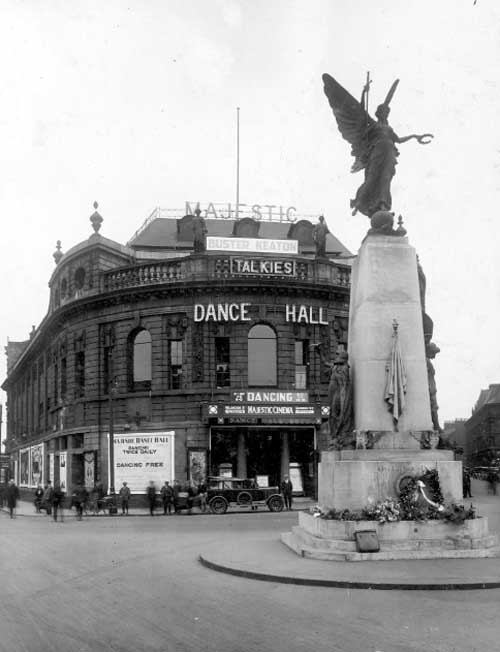
The war memorial with the original angel of victory in its original location on City Square.

Following the First World War the Royal Academy invited sculptors to submit models for war memorials. Fehr submitted a design less conventional than the more traditional cenotaph memorials. The design was successful and adopted most notably by Leeds but also by Eastbourne, Lisburn and Lockerbie. The memorial was initially erected in City Square before being relocated to Victoria Square off the Headrow.

=== Relocation ===
Until the 1930s the site now occupied by Victoria Square was occupied by buildings. From the late nineteenth century, Leeds Corporation had sought to widen Park Lane to create the boulevard now known as The Headrow. This scheme had begun with the demolition and relocation of Leeds Cathedral prior to the First World War. In 1936 it was decided as part of this scheme to create a garden of rest in front of the municipal buildings on the Headrow of the central library and art gallery. Previously this site had been occupied by Wharton's Hotel and the offices of the Leeds Permanent Building Society (which subsequently moved adjacent to the buildings now occupied by The Light). In January 1937 it was decided to relocate the memorial into the new garden of rest to accommodate new traffic arrangements on City Square. The garden of rest was officially opened by Lord Mayor of Leeds, Tom Coombs, following which the war memorial was re-dedicated.

=== Removal during the Second World War ===
A crack was found in the obelisk in 1940, following which the decision was taken to remove the memorial for repairs and it was duly taken down in 1940. Owing to concerns about potential bomb damage during the Leeds Blitz the memorial remained in storage until being replaced in 1946.

=== Deterioration, removal again and refurbishment ===
Further damage was sustained from wind resulting in the angel of victory statue being removed again in 1965. In 1967 the memorial was capped with marble. The winged victory statue was then relocated to Cottingley Crematorium where it continued to deteriorate to a point beyond repair by which time it was removed in November 1988. The head of the statue is all which presently survives and is part of the Leeds Sculpture Collection. The memorial remained without a crowning statue until in 1990 it was decided a replacement should be commissioned. Rather than a replica, a more conciliatory design was favoured in the form of the statue of the Angel of Peace. This was designed by sculptor Ian Judd and was dedicated at a Remembrance Day ceremony on 10 November 1991.

== Description ==
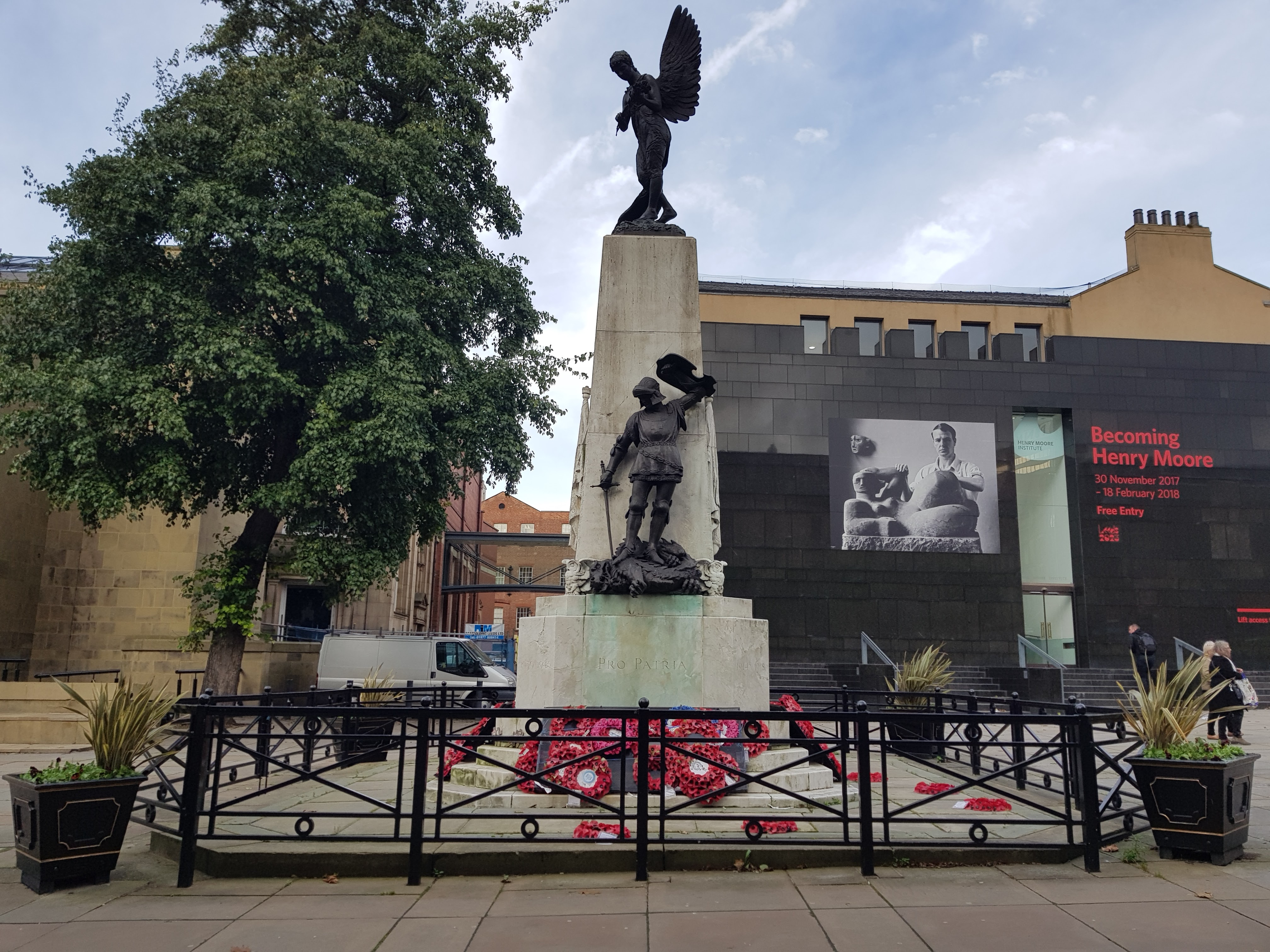
South side of the Leeds War Memorial, with the art gallery behind

The memorial is of a marble 'pyramid' obelisk topped with a bronze angel of peace holding roses. The angel was added in 1992 as a replacement for Fehr's original angel of victory with a sword and wreath which was damaged during a storm. This was similar to the angels currently atop of war memorials in Colchester and Eastbourne. The obelisk is flanked by 'Peace releasing a dove' on the north side and 'Saint George and the Dragon' on the south. The corners of the obelisk are adorned with owls; being the heraldic symbol of the City of Leeds.

=== Inscriptions ===
The memorial is inscribed on all sides

- Invictis Pax (north face)
- Ovr Gloriovs Dead (west face)
- Honovr to the Fallen (east face)
- Pro Patria (south face)
- 1914–1918 (north-west corner)
- 1939–1945 (south-west corner)
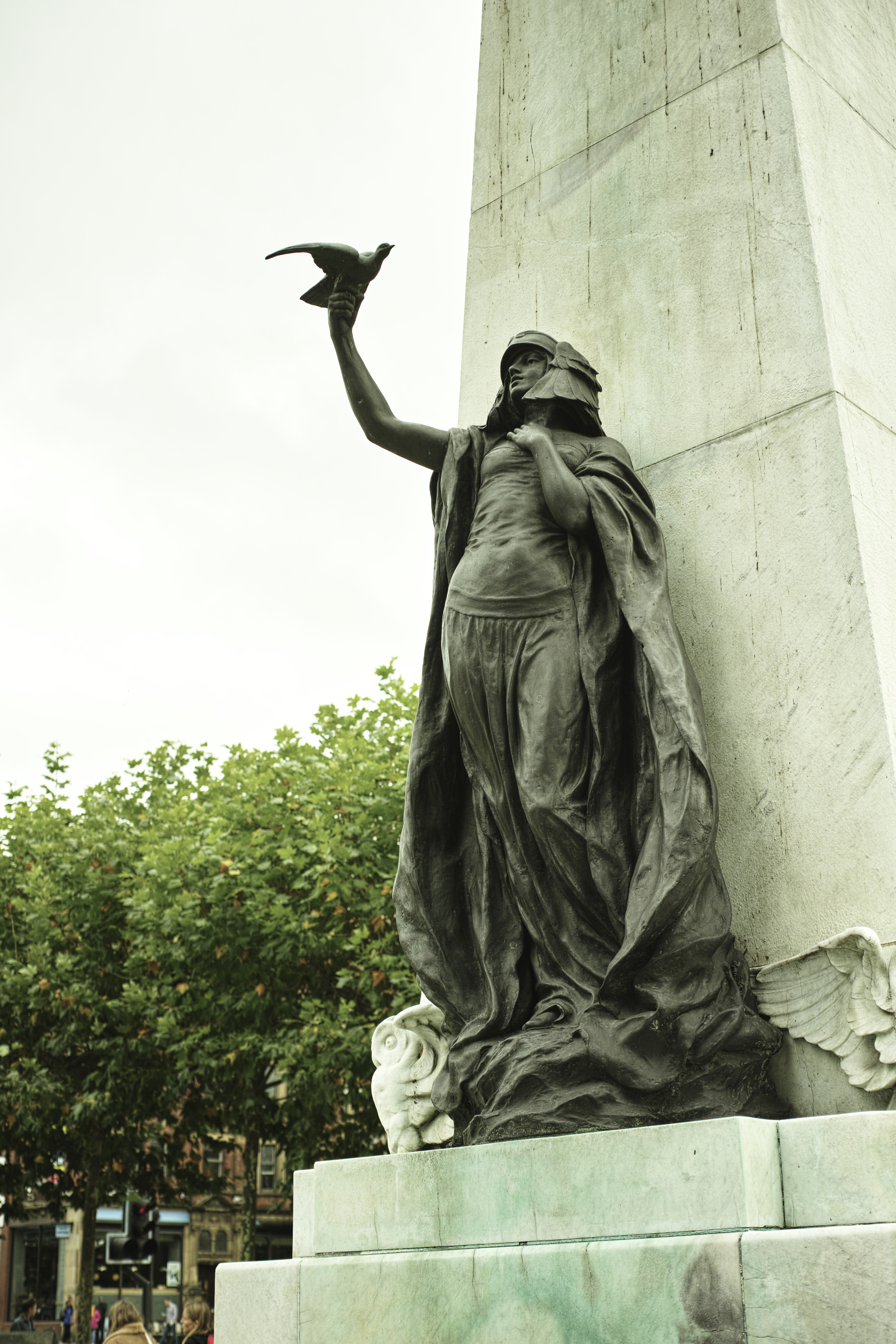
Peace releasing a dove

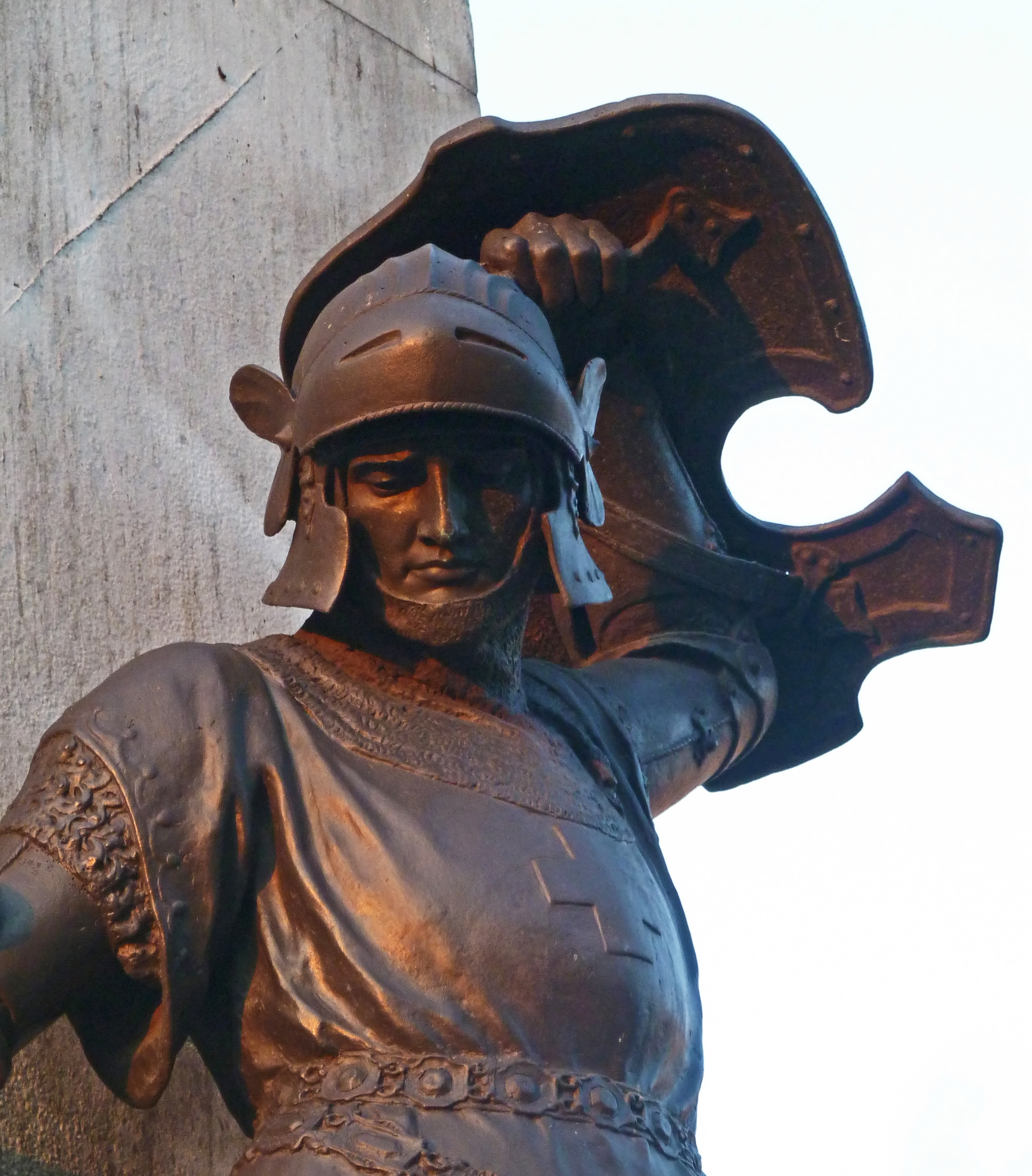
Saint George and the Dragon

== Today ==
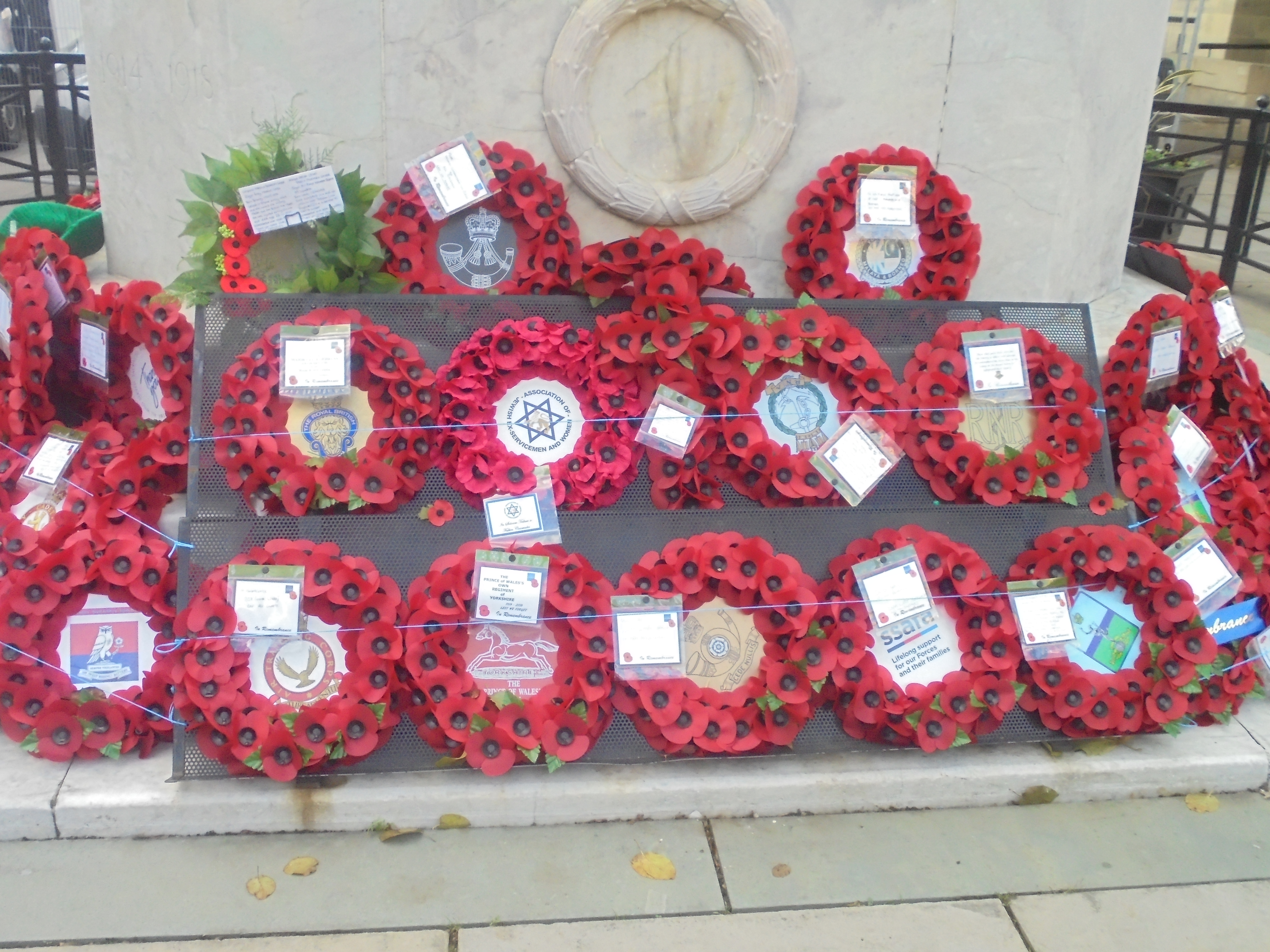
Wreaths at the memorial in November 2018

Today the memorial is the centre of Leeds' remembrance day obligations. Adjacent to the memorial are mountings for three flag poles which are brought in for the ceremony.

== See also ==
- Listed buildings in Leeds (City and Hunslet Ward - northern area)

== Notes and references ==
Notes

Citations
