= St John's Shopping Centre =

St John's Shopping Centre may refer to:

- St John's Centre, Leeds
- St Johns Shopping Centre, Liverpool
- St John's Shopping Centre, Perth
