= Leeds city centre =

Central business district of Leeds, West Yorkshire, England

Coordinates: 53.7998°N 1.5482°W

- Central business district
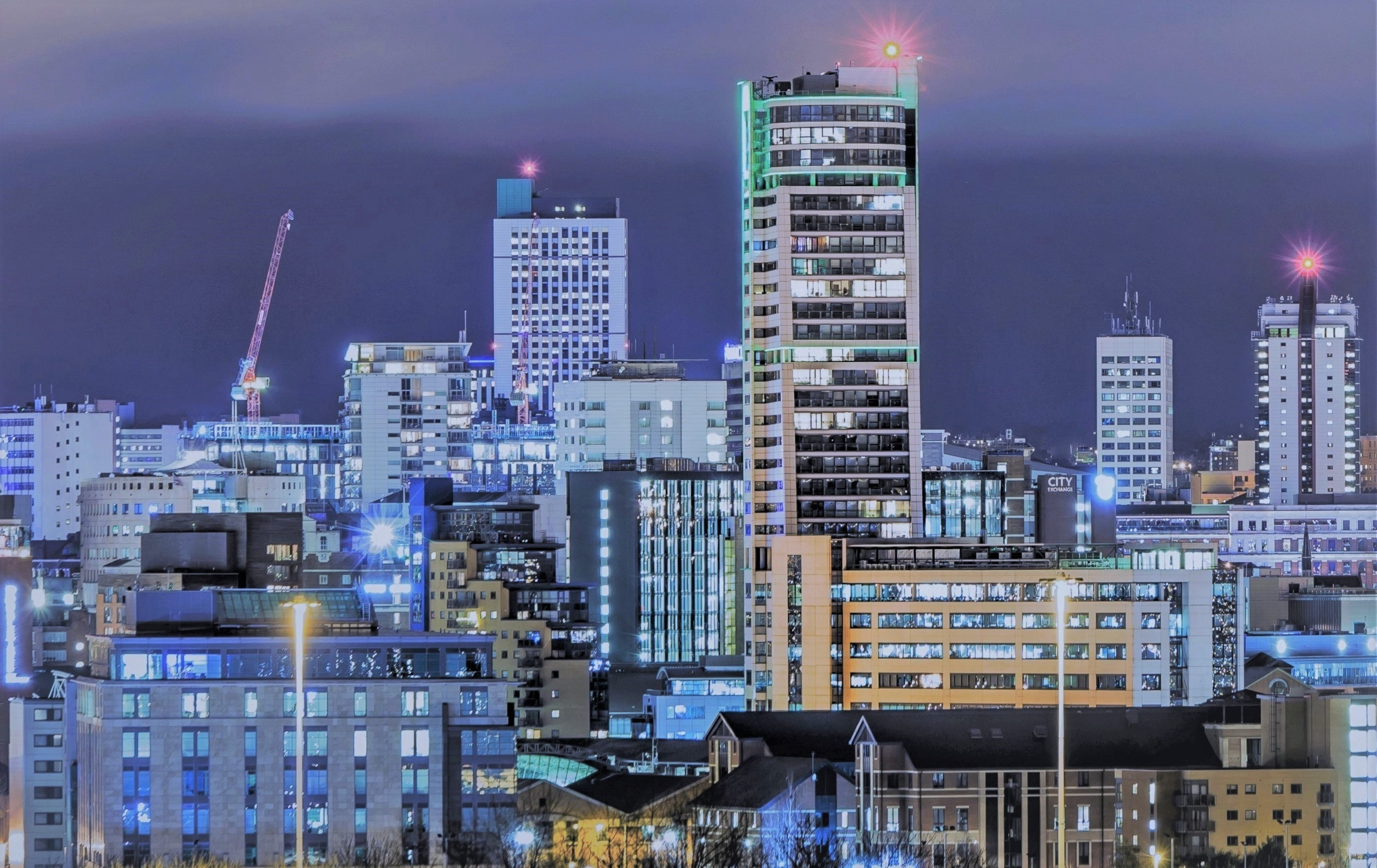
- Skyline of Leeds

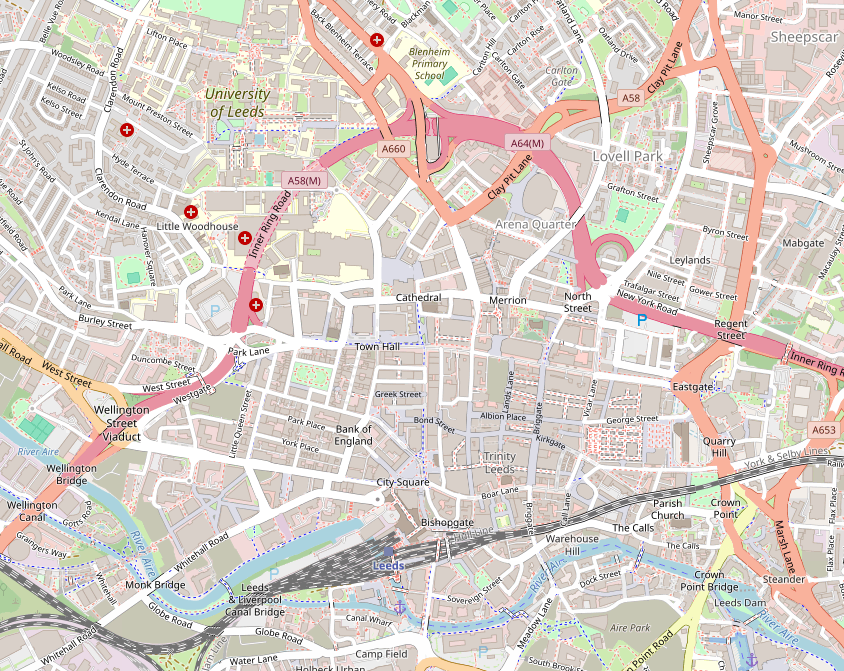
- Street map

- Location within West Yorkshire
- OS grid reference: SE297338
  - London: 190 mi (310 km) SSE
- Metropolitan borough: City of Leeds
- Metropolitan county: West Yorkshire
- Region: Yorkshire and the Humber
- Country: England
- Sovereign state: United Kingdom
- Post town: Leeds
- Postcode district: LS1, LS2, LS10, LS11
- Dialling code: 0113
- Police: West Yorkshire
- Fire: West Yorkshire
- Ambulance: Yorkshire
- UK Parliament: Leeds Central

Leeds city centre is the central business district of Leeds, West Yorkshire, England. It is roughly bounded by the Inner Ring Road to the north and the River Aire to the south and can be divided into several quarters.

== Areas ==
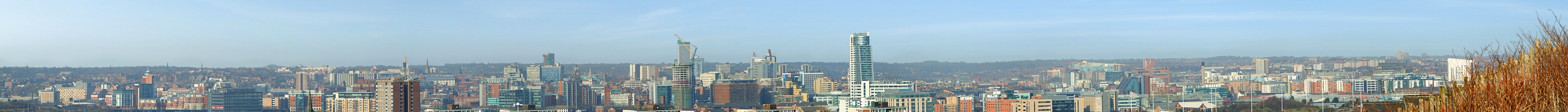
Leeds city centre from the south

=== Under the Headrow ===
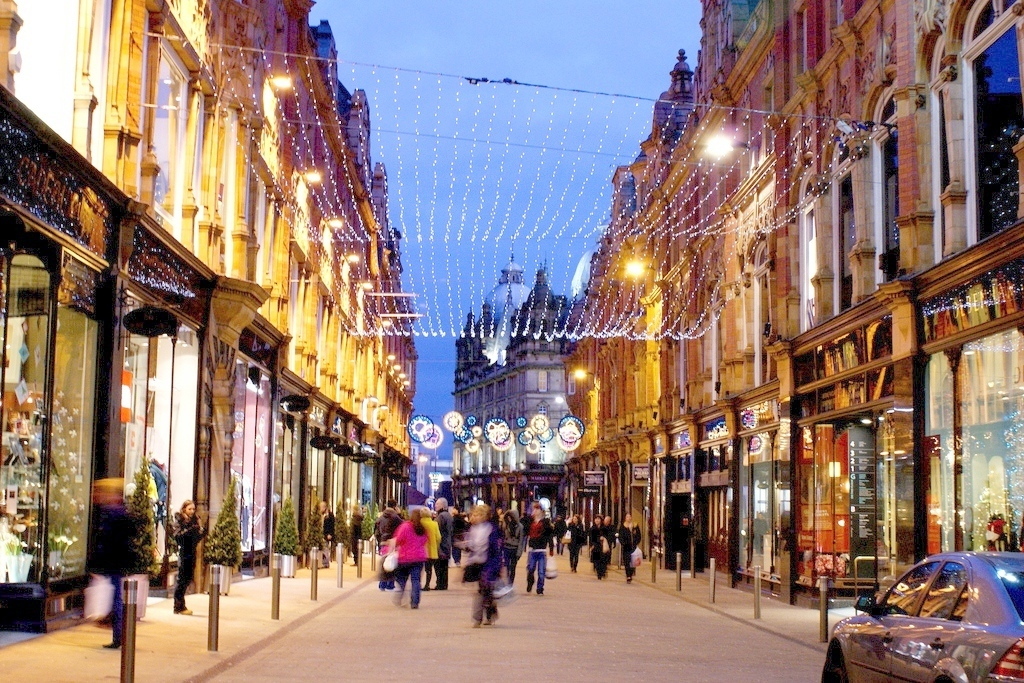
King Edward Street

The old town is considered the retail core of Leeds, it extends south from buildings on either side of The Headrow to the River Aire. Kirkgate and Briggate are the oldest streets in Leeds, from which the city grew from. Briggate is home to several chain food and shopping chains, was fully pedestrianised in 1996 and connected the two previously pedestrian areas either side of it.

The old town can be further subdivided into several areas: the city square; the Victorian arcades (such as the Grand Arcade, Thornton's Arcade and the County Arcade); department stores and indoor shopping centres of The Headrow (such as The Light and St John's Centre), The Calls' markets (Corn Exchange and Leeds Kirkgate Market).

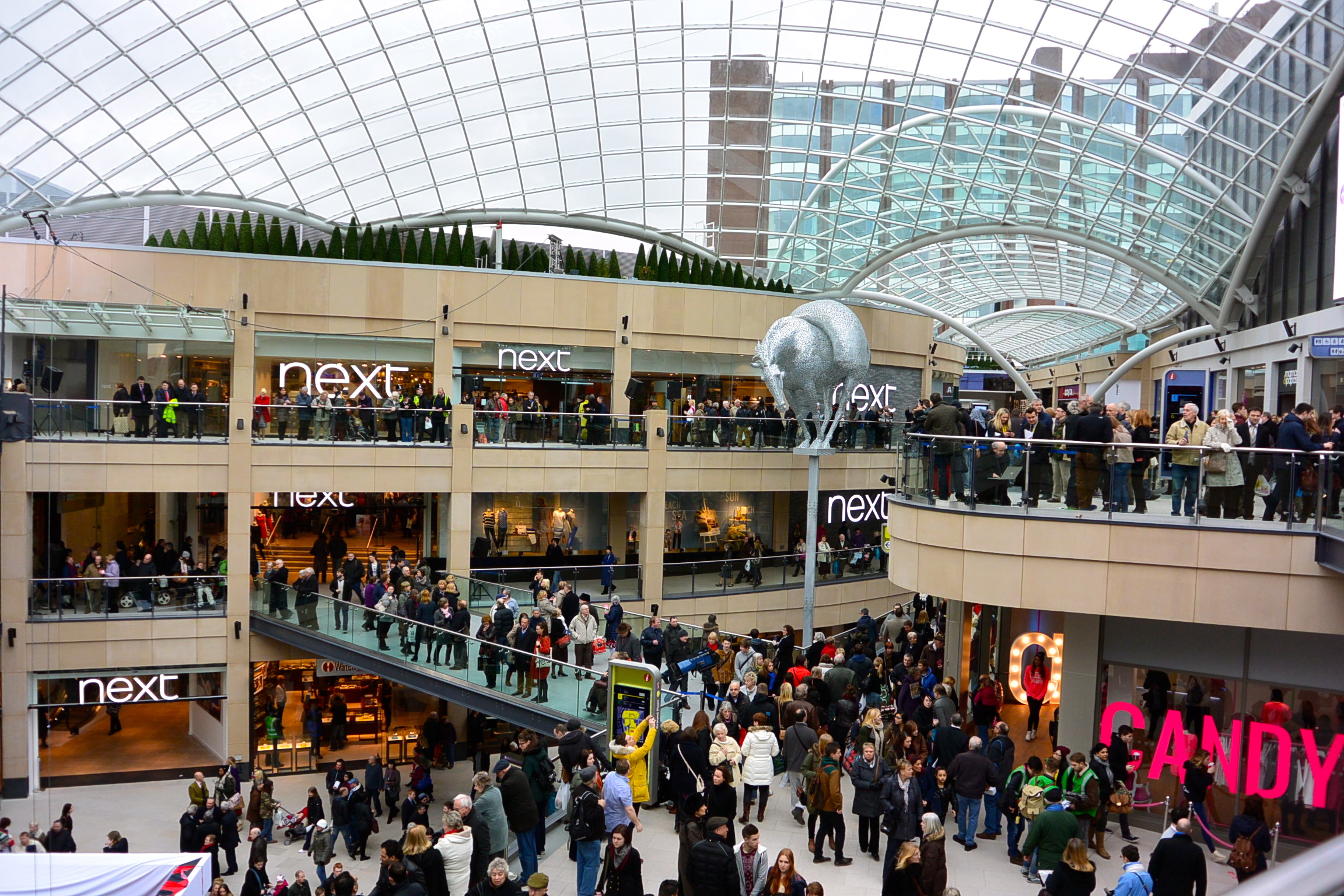
Trinity Leeds opening day

Opened 21 March 2013, Trinity Leeds shopping centre had a surge of 130,000 people enter its doors on the first day of opening. Costing £350 million, and creating 3,000 jobs, this was a major development for Leeds. It was the only major retail development to open in the UK in 2013. It covers 1,000,000 sq ft (93,000 m^{2}) with has a capacity for 120 shops and numerous pop-up shops.

The Calls is close to the River Aire. The area's decline began in the early 20th century when industry moved away from the centre outwards. From 1985 to 1995 Leeds Corporation carried out a major regeneration with a careful conversion of listed building warehouses and new build in sympathetic style for a mixed-use area. Many of the area's old industrial buildings have now been converted into modern flats and commercial buildings.

=== Over the Headrow ===
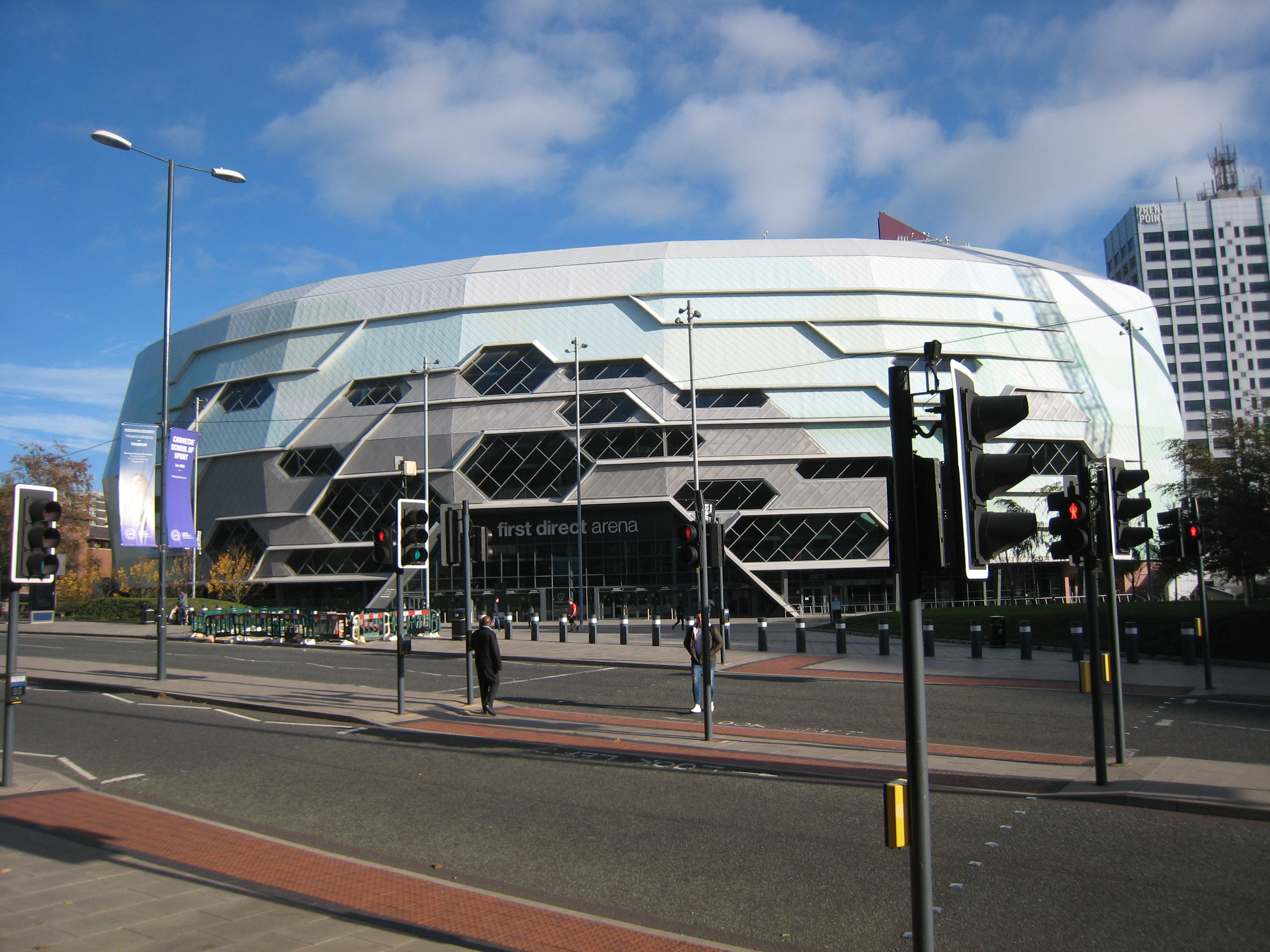
Leeds Arena

Mediaeval Leeds ended at The Headrow, multiple entertainment venues and municipal buildings were built directly north of the narrower shopping areas of the city.

The area's entertainment venues are Leeds Arena, are Leeds Academy, Leeds Grand Theatre and Opera House. Millennium Square anchored by the civic hall was a flagship project to mark the year 2000. It hosts regular concerts, with past performers including the Kaiser Chiefs, Bridewell Taxis, HARD-Fi, Fall Out Boy and Embrace.

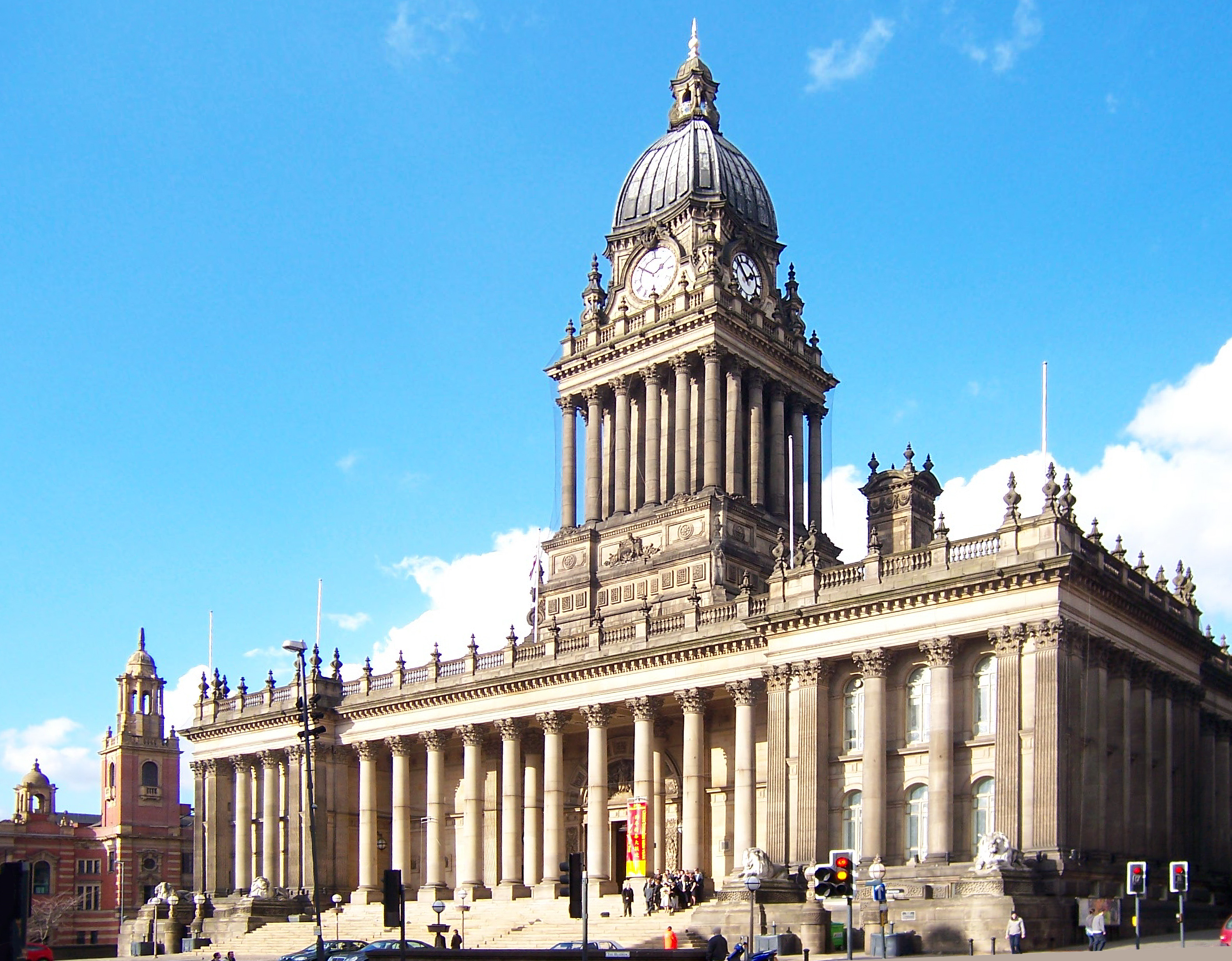
Leeds Town Hall

It is home to a number of grand Victorian buildings that are important in the civic life of the city. Prominent institutes include Leeds Magistrates' and Crown Courts, Leeds Library, Leeds Art Gallery, Leeds Civic Hall and Leeds Town Hall. The town hall was completed in 1858 and opened by Queen Victoria. Leeds Civic Hall opened in 1933 by King George V and is home to the Lord Mayor's Room and the council chambers. Many barristers' chambers and solicitors' offices are found here because of the close proximity to the courts.

The area has a number high-rise residential properties and developments, including Sky Plaza and Opal 3. Altus House is the tallest building in Yorkshire. Other major institutions are located within the Quarter, including the Yorkshire Bank HQ and also the Merrion Centre. Queen Square is also found here.

=== North-western campuses ===
Leeds General Infirmary, the Leeds Beckett University and the University of Leeds each have a large campus forming an expansive tri-campus area in the north-east city centre, spanning both sides of the inner ring road and expanding into the areas. In addition to the two university campuses there are also multiple smaller education campuses to the area including Leeds Arts University, Notre Dame Sixth Form College, Leeds City College and Blenheim Primary School.

=== East ===
Quarry Hill is the city's northern cultural quarter. Centred upon Centenary Square, landmarks include: NHS England's Quarry House; the BBC Yorkshire building, which moved from Woodhouse Lane in August 2004; the Leeds Playhouse, which opened in March 1990; Leeds College of Music, which moved to its current location in 1997; and Northern Ballet which moved to the area in 2010. Leeds City College also has a large campus here.

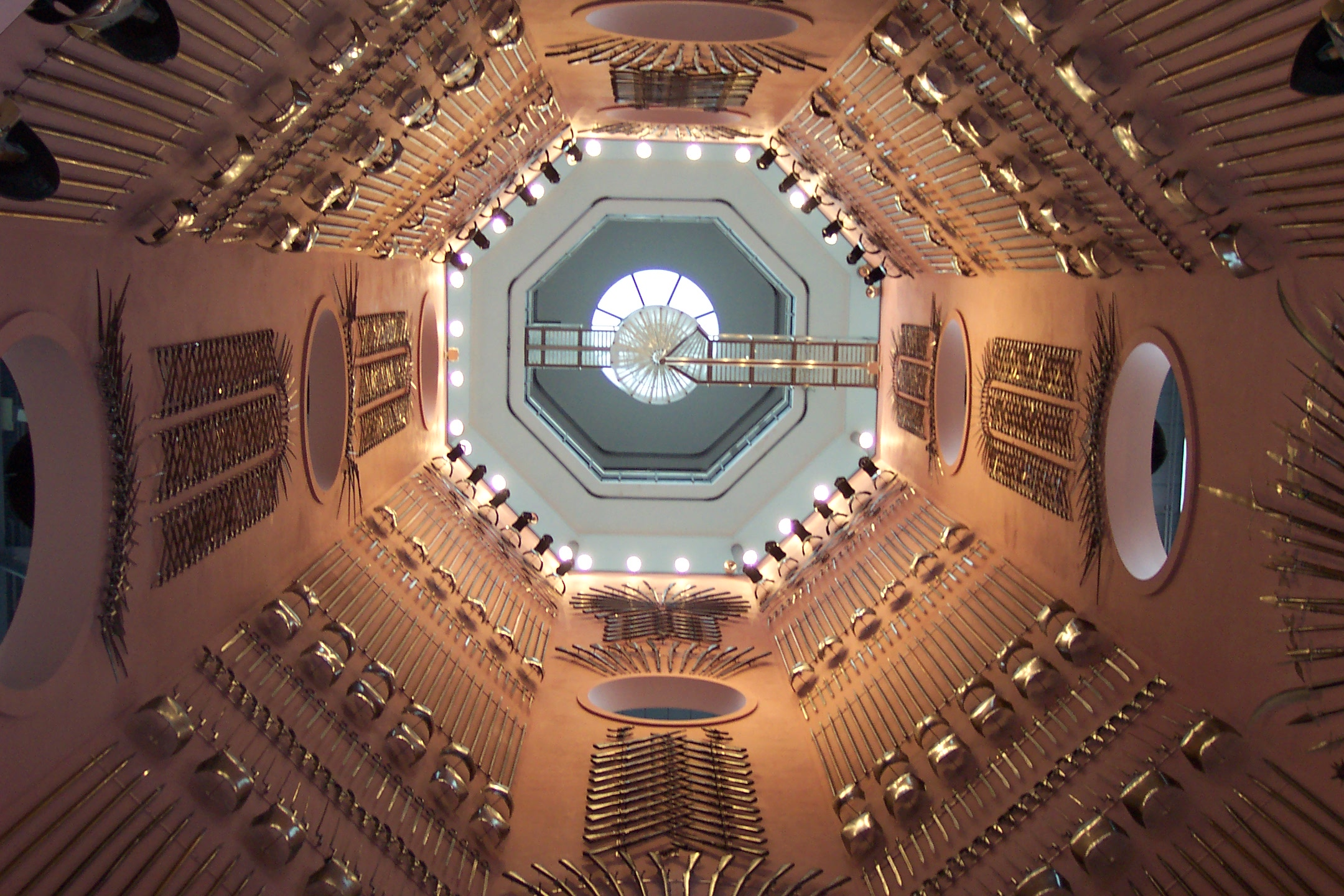
Inside the Royal Armouries main stairwell

Leeds Dock is the city's southern Cultural Quarter. It is where the Royal Armouries Museum can be found, the building was designed by architect Derek Walker and built at a cost of £42.5 million over two years. The museum has since become one of the city's major tourist attractions.

=== West ===
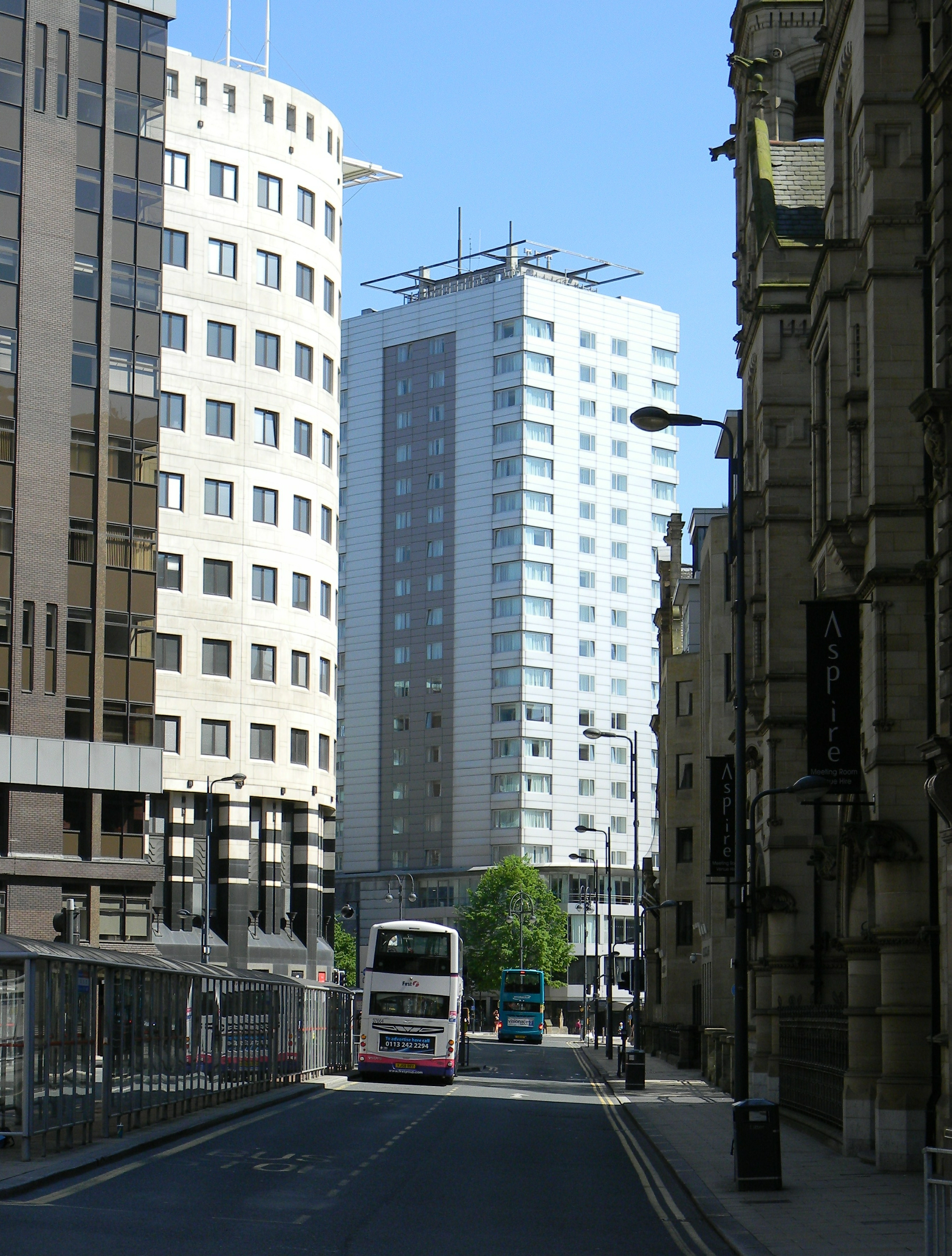
Infirmary Street in the heart of financial quarter.

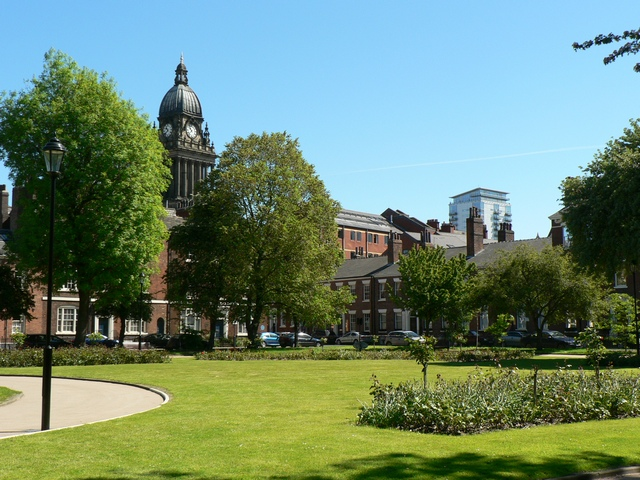
Park Square in the financial quarter

The Financial Quarter is bounded by Park Row to the east, Leeds Inner Ring Road to the west, The Headrow to the north and Wellington Street to the south. It is centred on the Georgian Park Square, one of the green spaces in Leeds city centre. The City Centre Loop passes through the quarter, using City Square, Quebec Street, King Street and East Parade. Leeds Law School is at Cloth Hall Court. Major names can be found in the financial quarter such as Aviva and The Bank of England. The district has grown out towards the west of the city. The Wellington Place development and the wider Wellington Gardens area of the city contain a number of international corporations. Wellington Place is currently under construction.

Historically, Holbeck Urban Village was Holbeck's closest area to the centre of Leeds. Due to the expansion of the city, it is now considered part of the city centre and was rezoned as Holbeck Urban Village, following the completion of a number of developments. is the name given by local government and planning agencies to a mixed-use urban renewal area south of Leeds railway station. Bridgewater Place and also Granary Wharf are within Holbeck Urban Village. The new High Speed 2 station was due to border this area of Leeds, which is why much of the area is considered prime location for development.

== Major corporations ==
Leeds city centre has offices of a number of banks and financial services companies:

- The Bank of England
- Aviva
- Zurich Financial Services
- Leeds Building Society
- Lloyds TSB
- KPMG
- Direct Line
- Yorkshire Bank
- HBOS

Hospitality in the city centre includes:

- Queens Hotel
- Malmaison Hotel
- Radisson Blu Hotel
- The Ivy
- Miller and Carter

Other headquarters include Asda and Channel 4.

== Leeds Lights ==
Each Christmas the streets of Leeds city centre are decorated with a variety of Christmas lights. The switch on ceremony is in early November, when a celebrity flicks the switch to illuminate the decorations at Victoria Gardens and usually attracts tens of thousands of people to the turning on ceremony. When Leeds Lights were first established in 1983, the switch on was held on the fourth Thursday of November, however it has since been brought forward. The illuminations are renowned as being the largest display in the United Kingdom, spanning over 13 miles (21 km) of city centre streets and using over 2 million low energy light bulbs.

Leeds is notable for designing, manufacturing and maintaining its own Christmas light motifs. Its workshop began as a place to provide people with disabilities some employment opportunities. Its workshop has had several locations, beginning in a temporary location near Chapeltown Road, then to the old disused Whitbread Brewery site at Kirkstall and from 1993 to the present Seacroft location. Leeds City Council was the only local authority to do this for some years but now a small number have followed Leeds Lights example in preparing their own displays where as most other councils buy in their lights and services. The lights are repaired and pressure cleaned annually at the Leeds Lights workshop in Seacroft throughout the year. 80,000 coloured lamps are stored at the workshop, and 2000 metres of coloured rope light are used. A team of 14 works all year round producing the display. From October–January, a team of 9 works to erect the lights ready for the switch on in early November, before removing the lights after Christmas.

Commercial advertising has been permitted on some of the lights, such as The Headrow's champagne bottle lights.

The Christmas lights are usually turned on by a celebrity.

== Transport ==
=== Rail ===
Leeds railway station

Leeds city centre is served by Leeds railway station. The station is one of 20 in Great Britain to be managed by Network Rail. It is the busiest English station outside London, and the UK's second busiest station outside London after Glasgow Central. The station serves national, regional and suburban railway services.

=== Road ===
Traffic passing past Leeds city centre is diverted away from the main areas by the Leeds Inner Ring Road, an urban motorway passing the east, north and west of the city centre. Much of the road is in tunnels so not visible to passing pedestrians. All major routes into Leeds head towards the city centre. The city centre is served by the M621 motorway.

=== Buses ===
The most notable bus service within central Leeds is the LeedsCityBus service operated by First Leeds and funded by West Yorkshire Metro. This service runs every few minutes in a clockwise direction around the city centre. It serves major transport interchanges and both universities as well as the main shopping and financial districts. There have been calls for a second FreeCityBus to serve emerging business, leisure and residential districts in the southern part of central Leeds.

Leeds City bus station, the city's main bus station, is in the east of the city centre. However, as a rule only buses heading out of the City of Leeds and National Express services use it. Local First Leeds buses use stops on the city streets, or a number of smaller bus stations, referred to as bus points, at Bond Street, Infirmary Street, Leeds railway station and the Corn Exchange.
