= Henry Charles Fehr =

British artist

- Born: 4 November 1867; Forest Hill, London
- Died: 13 May 1940 (aged 72); London, England
- Education: City of London School
- Alma mater: Royal Academy Schools
- Known for: Sculpture, public memorials

Henry Charles Fehr FRBS (4 November 1867 – 13 May 1940) was a British monumental and architectural sculptor active in the late nineteenth and early twentieth centuries. He produced several notable public sculptures, war memorials and works for civic buildings. These included architectural sculptures for Middlesex Guildhall, for Wakefield County Hall and for Cardiff City Hall. Throughout the 1920s, Fehr created a number of war memorials, often featuring detailed bronze statuary, for British towns and cities. Notable examples of Fehr's war memorials include those at Leeds, Colchester, Keighley and at Burton upon Trent.

== Biography ==
Fehr was born in Forest Hill in south-east London into a Swiss family, who had settled in England. Fehr attended the City of London School and is thought to have trained as an apprentice in the studio of the sculptor and stonemason Horace Montford, who supported his application to the Royal Academy Schools in 1885. Although Fehr won several prizes at the Academy, he was narrowly beaten to the 1889 gold medal in sculpture and a travelling scholarship by his fellow student Goscombe John.

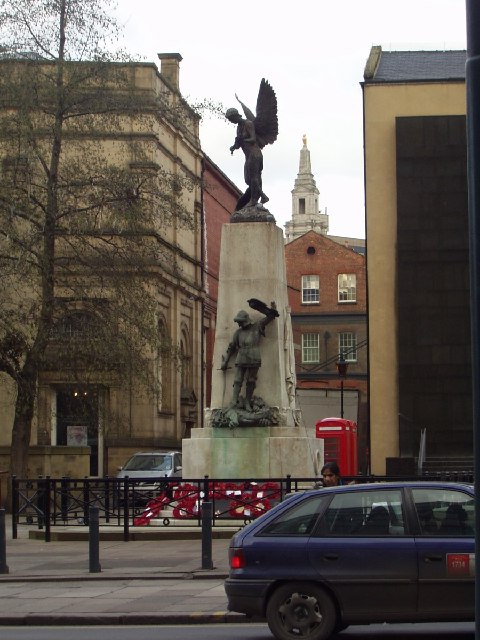
Leeds War Memorial, sculpted by Fehr

When he graduated from the Royal Academy, Fehr worked as an assistant in the studio of Thomas Brock. There, Fehr created a monumental bronze sculpture, The Rescue of Andromeda, which is considered his first significant work and was subsequently purchased by the Chantrey Bequest for the Tate Gallery. Fehr was greatly upset, and protested repeatedly, when the Tate moved the sculpture from an internal gallery to the position outside the building where it remains. The success, and naturalistic style of The Rescue of Andromeda led to Fehr being, briefly, regarded as part of the New Sculpture movement. Although the association didn't last, like the New Sculpture artists, Fehr's did receive several commissions from firms of architects keen to include decorative sculptures into the designs of their new buildings. For the architect Charles Fitzroy Doll Fehr produced four life-size terracotta sculptures of British queens for the Hotel Russell in London's Bloomsbury. For the firm of Lanchester, Stewart & Rickards, he created architectural decorations for the dome of the Methodist Central Hall in Westminster and also the Welsh dragon that sits above Cardiff City Hall. J.S Gibson & Partners commissioned Fehr for decorative works on several buildings including the West Ham Technical Institute in London, for a school in Scarborough, for Walsall Central Library and, most notably, for the Middlesex Guildhall in Parliament Square. For the same company, Fehr made a coloured plaster relief frieze of scenes from the Wars of the Roses for the interior of Wakefield County Hall in 1898.

In October 1919, as World War I was drawing to a close, the Royal Academy in London held an exhibition of war memorial designs. At the exhibition Fehr displayed statuettes of three figures, Peace holding a dove, a winged Victory and Saint George with a sword and shield. Bronze statues of these figures appeared on several of the war memorials that Fehr created throughout the 1920s for British towns and cities. All three figures positioned on, or around, a stone obelisk, featured on the memorials Fehr created at Colchester, at Burton-upon-Trent, and, in different versions, on the Leeds War Memorial. Several other memorials, including those at Lockerbie and Langholm in Scotland, at Eastbourne and at Grangetown in Cardiff, only featured the figure of Victory, holding a laurel wreath and an inverted sword, on a pedestal or obelisk. The memorial at Keighley has a version of Peace with bronze statues of an infantryman in battle dress and a sailor holding a telescope. The memorial on the Bund in Shanghai (destroyed on the orders of the Japanese army in 1943) featured Peace guarding a mother and child.

Fehr first exhibited at the Royal Academy in 1887. He exhibited at the La Libre Esthétique in Brussels and was a founding member of the Royal British Society of Sculptors in 1904, and was later elected a Fellow of the Society. Throughout his career, Fehr sculpted a number of portrait busts. These included several of William Morris, versions of which are in the Royal Academy collection, the William Morris Gallery and the Art Workers Guild collection while Fehr's marble busts of John Ruskin and Robert Browning are held by the South London Gallery.

== Public works ==
=== 1891–1900 ===
Image	Title / subject	Location and coordinates	Date	Type	Material	Dimensions	Designation	Wikidata	Notes
More images	The Rescue of Andromeda	Exterior of Tate Britain, London	1893	Sculpture group on pedestal	Bronze				
More images	James Watt	Leeds City Square	1898	Statue on pedestal	Bronze and granite		Grade II	Q26655856	
	Elizabeth I, Mary II, Queen Anne and Queen Victoria	Hotel Russell, Bloomsbury, London	1900	4 statues in niches	Terracotta				

=== 1901–1910 ===
Image	Title / subject	Location and coordinates	Date	Type	Material	Dimensions	Designation	Wikidata	Notes
	Memorial to David Garrick	No. 27 Southampton Street, Covent Garden, London	1901	Relief plaque	Bronze				
	Archibald Forbes	Crypt of St Paul's Cathedral, London	1902	Plaque	Bronze & Brazilian onyx				
More images	John Harrison	Leeds City Square	1903	Statue on pedestal with plaque	Bronze and granite		Grade II	Q26655861	
More images	Queen Victoria	Queen Victoria Square, Kingston upon Hull	1903	Statue and figures on pedestal with surround	Bronze and Portland stone		Grade II	Q26492135	
	Welsh Dragon	Pinnacle of entrance hall, City Hall, Cardiff	1904	Architectural sculpture	Bronze		Grade I		
More images	James Watt	Former Watt Memorial School, Greenock	1908	Statue on pedestal	Bronze and stone		Category B		

=== 1911–1920 ===
Image	Title / subject	Location and coordinates	Date	Type	Material	Dimensions	Designation	Wikidata	Notes
More images	John Hampden	Market Square, Aylesbury, Buckinghamshire	1911	Statue on pedestal	Bronze and stone		Grade II	Q26647298	
More images	Historical figures	Façade of Middlesex Guildhall, Parliament Square, London	1906–13	Reliefs, statues and frieze	Stone		Grade II*		
More images	War memorial	Eastbourne, East Sussex	1920	Statue on pedestal	Bronze and granite		Grade II	Q61670643	

=== 1921–1930 ===
Image	Title / subject	Location and coordinates	Date	Type	Material	Dimensions	Designation	Wikidata	Notes
	War memorial	Grange Gardens, Grangetown, Cardiff	1921	Statue on pedestal with panels	Bronze and Portland stone		Grade II	Q29496527	
More images	War memorial	Langholm, Dumfries & Galloway	1921	Statue on pedestal	Bronze and granite			Q114168682	
More images	Burton upon Trent war memorial	Memorial Gardens, Burton upon Trent, Staffordshire	1922	3 statues on a pedestal	Bronze and Portland stone		Grade II*	Q26577152	
More images	Leeds War Memorial	The Headrow, Leeds	1922	Obelisk with 3 statues	Portland stone and bronze	7m tall	Grade II	Q26547390	
More images	War memorial	Shepherd's Bush Green, London	1922	Statue on pedestal	Bronze and stone		Grade II	Q26487630	
	War memorial	High Street, Lockerbie	1922	Statue on pedestal	Bronze and stone				
More images	War memorial	Colchester, Essex	1923	3 statues on pedestal with panels	Bronze and Portland stone	c. 10m tall	Grade II*	Q26671057	
More images	War memorial	Castle Street, Lisburn, County Antrim	1923	Statue on pedestal with panels	Bronze and marble				
	War memorial	Graaff-Reinet, South Africa	1923	Statue on pedestal	Bronze and stone				
More images	War memorial	The Bund, Shanghai, China	1924	Statue on pedestal with panels	Bronze and stone				
More images	War memorial	Town Hall Square, Keighley, West Yorkshire	1924	3 statues on pedestal	Bronze and stone	9.5m tall	Grade II*	Q26600400	

== Other works ==
- A set of carved relief panels at the former Westwood School, built 1897-1900, in Scarborough, North Yorkshire.
- 1903 Boer War memorial, a stone tablet and a figure of Justice, on the facade of the Old Library, Dulwich College, London.
- The identity of the sculptor of the war memorial at Coggeshall in Essex is unknown but has been attributed to Fehr due to its similarity to his nearby Colchester memorial.
- Statue of Benjamin Disraeli in the Market Square at Aylesbury.
- Marble, seated statue of Edmund Cartwright in Cartwright Hall, Bradford.
