= Albion Street, Leeds =

Street in Leeds, England

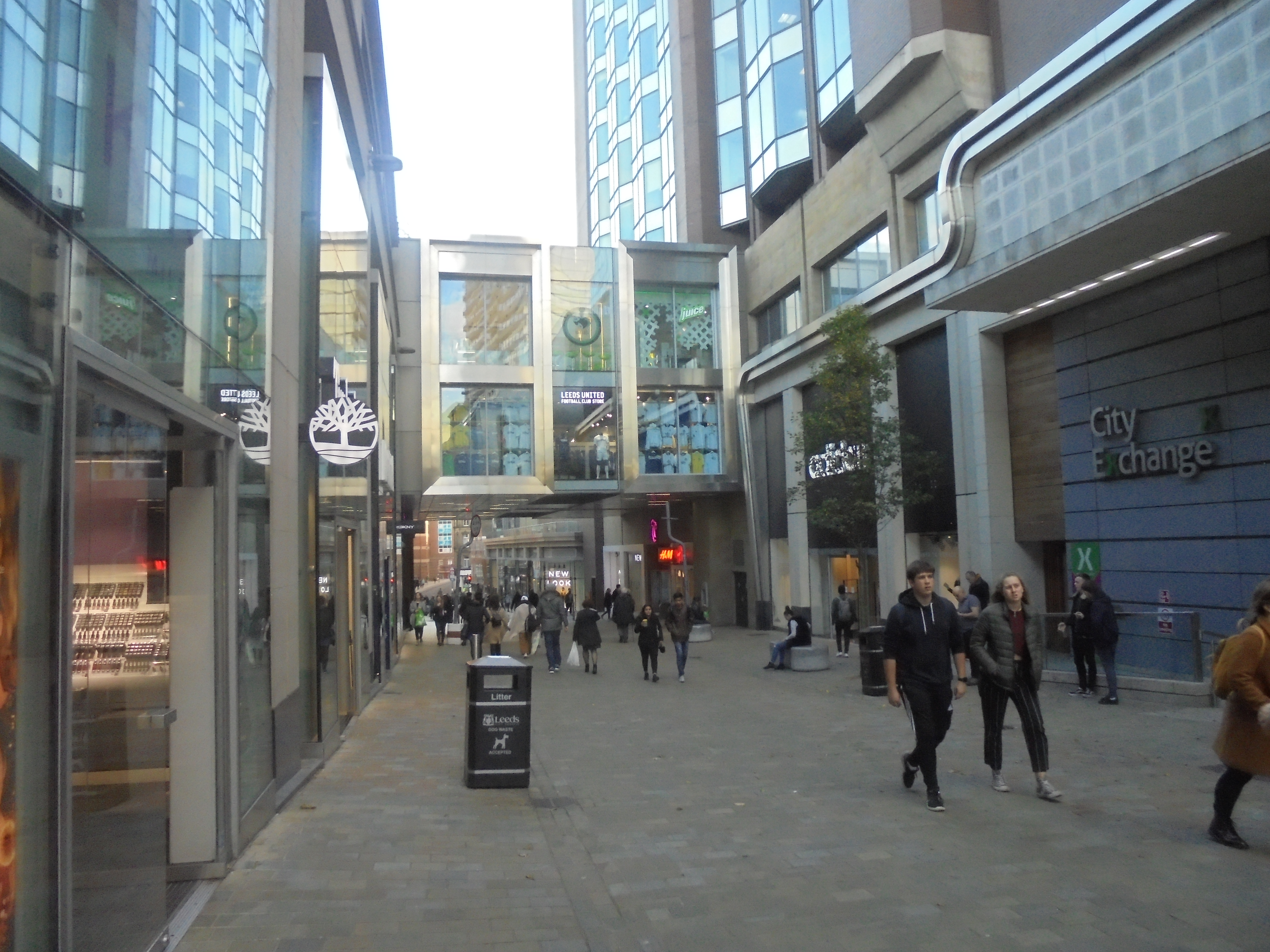
Southern part of Albion Street, looking south, in 2018

Albion Street is a road in the city centre of Leeds, a city in England.

== History ==
The street was constructed between 1790 and 1791, with an initial requirement that only housing could be constructed along it. This gradually changed, with a music hall being constructed in 1792/3, with a small hall underneath for trading in cloth. In 1802, a Methodist Chapel opened. By the 1850s, buildings on the street included the General Post Office, the American Consulate, the Inland Revenue Office, Coroner's Office, Clerk of the Peace's Office, Stock Exchange Hall, and the Catholic Literary Institution.

During the 20th century, the street became lined with shops, including a large Leeds Co-operative Society store. The southern part of the street was pedestrianised in 1970.

== Layout and architecture ==
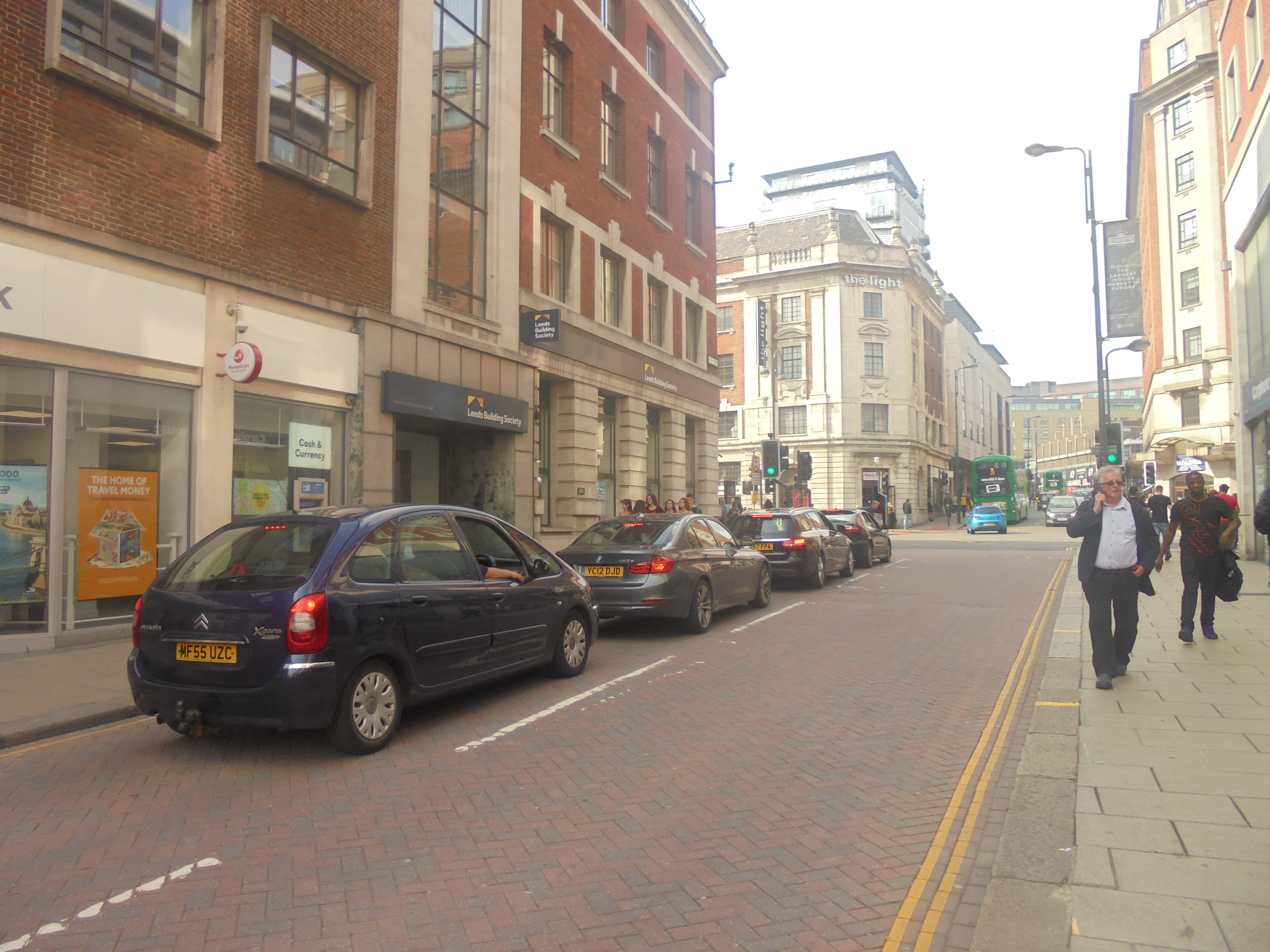
Northern part of Albion Street, looking north, in 2018

The street runs north, starting at Boar Lane, opposite the entrance to New Station Street. It passes underneath part of the Trinity Leeds shopping centre, to a crossroads with Commercial Street and Bond Street. It continues past Albion Place and Short Street, to a crossroads with Headrow. Passing between The Light and St John's Centre, it has junctions with Wormald Row and St Anne's Street, ending at a junction with Merrion Street and Great George Street, beyond which its continuation is Woodhouse Lane.

Other than the shopping centres, notable buildings on the street include Moorlands House, built in the 1850s as the headquarters of the Leeds and West Yorkshire Assurance Company.
