= St John's Centre =

Coordinates: 53.800°N 1.543°W

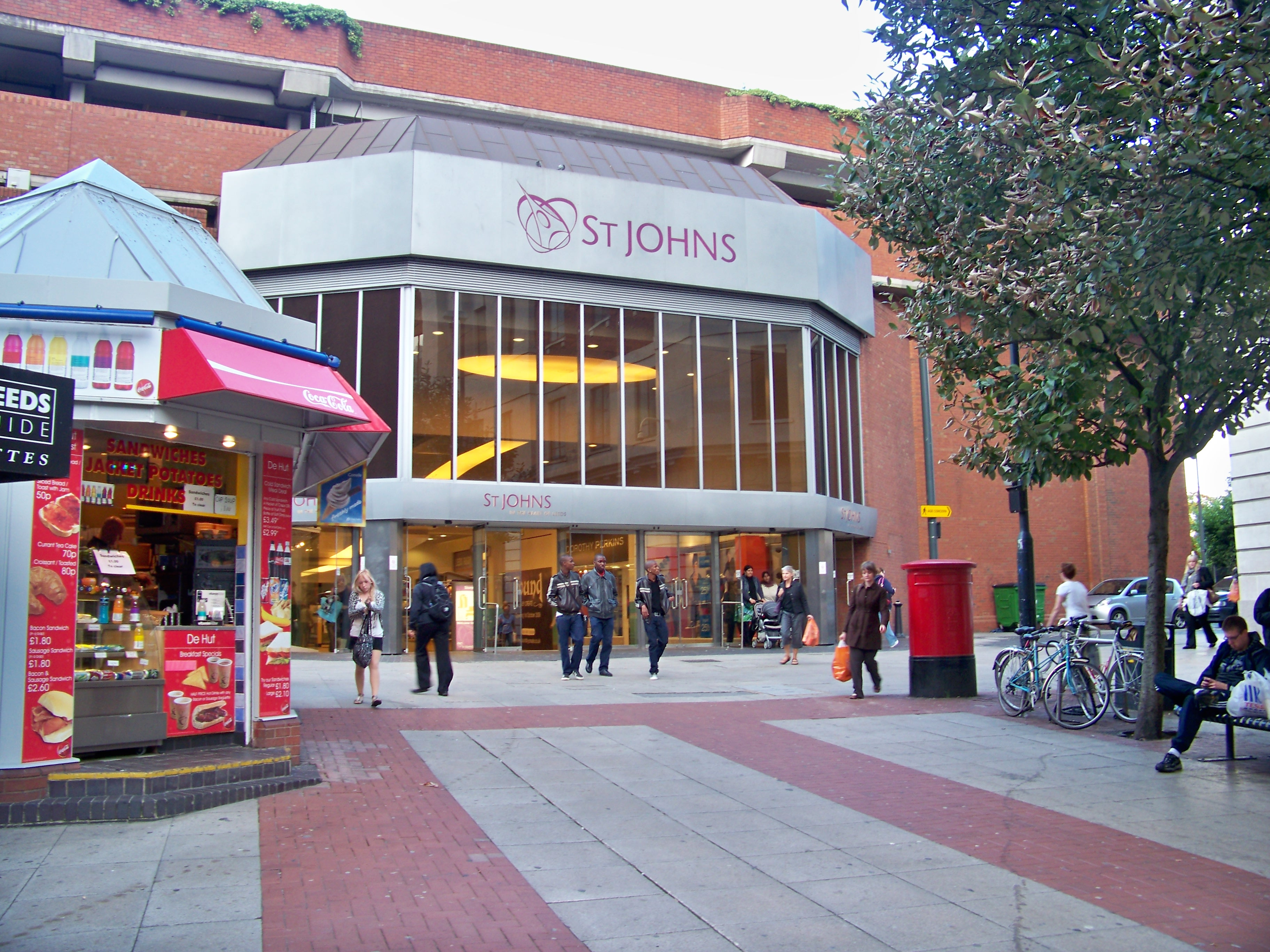
- Dortmund Square elevation.
- Location: Leeds, West Yorkshire, England
- Opened: 1985
- Num. of stores: 34
- Floors: 2
- Parking: 350 spaces
- Website: http://www.stjohnsleeds.co.uk

The St John's Centre is an indoor shopping centre in Leeds, West Yorkshire, England. The centre is surrounded by The Headrow to the south, Albion Street to the west and Merrion Street to the north. The centre makes up the central shopping centre to a row of three, that run up through the northern side of Leeds city centre, The Core to the south and the Merrion Centre to the north. The centre has an annual footfall of ten million. Dortmund Square lies to the front of the centre. In early 2005 the centre was refurbished.

== Stores and restaurants ==
The stores in St John's as of October 11 2026 are McDonald's, Poundland, Taco Bell, Burger King, HMV, Klass, Yours, Roman, Asiana sushi, Magic nails salon, North West clothing, Savers, Card Factory, Warren James, Regal Salons Rocling Mobiles and the Hole In Wand wizard golf (However this attraction is due to close on November 1st 2026)

Former retailers include Topshop and Index. The centre does not have an anchor retailer nor a unit large enough for one.

== Layout ==
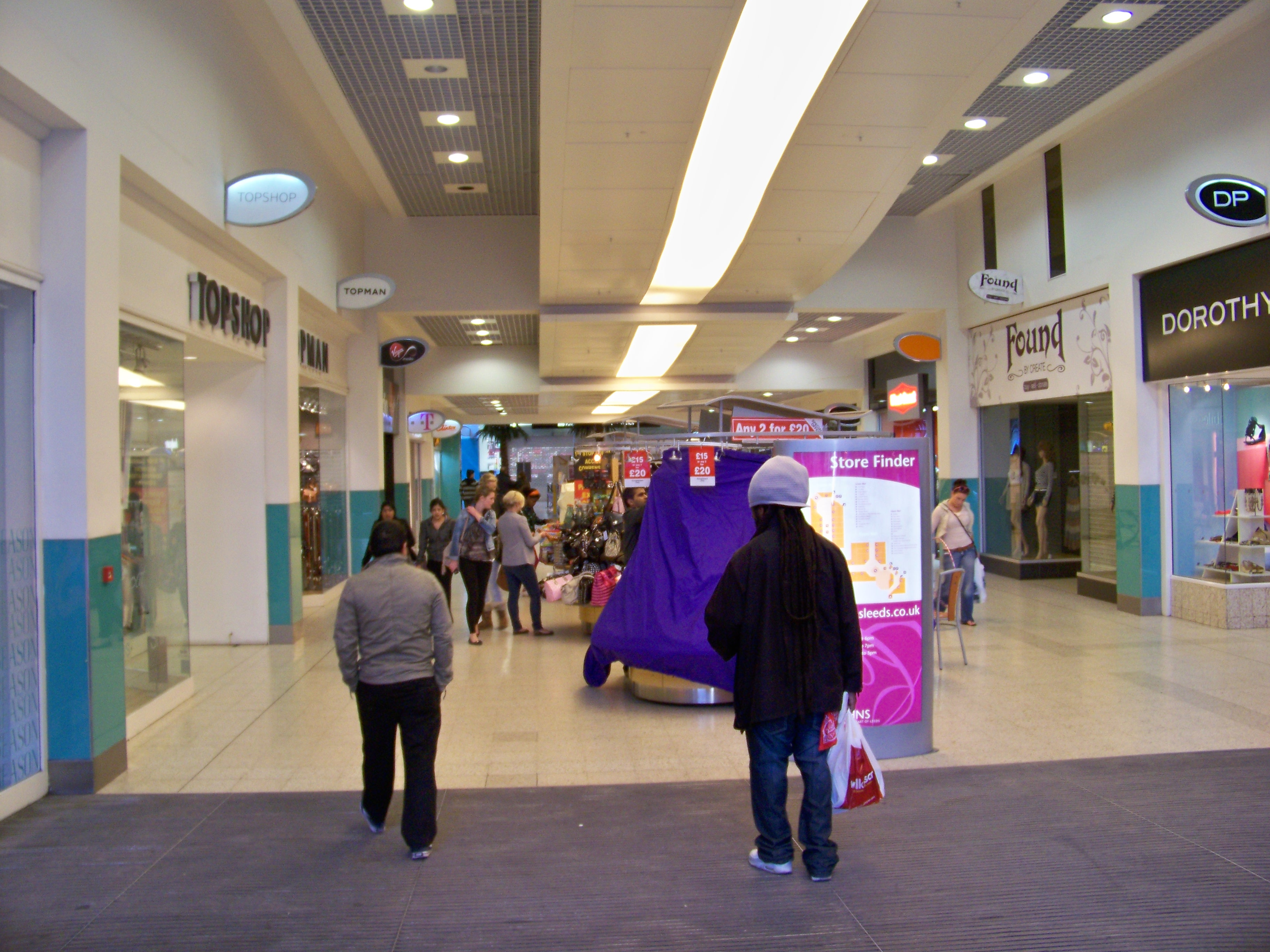
The interior elevation

The first floor is separated from the ground floor by three adjacent escalators with stairs running either side of them. Lifts also link the floors, however the two floors do not overlap in many places. The ground floor exits onto Dortmund Square on The Headrow, whilst the first floor exits to Albion Street and Merrion Street.

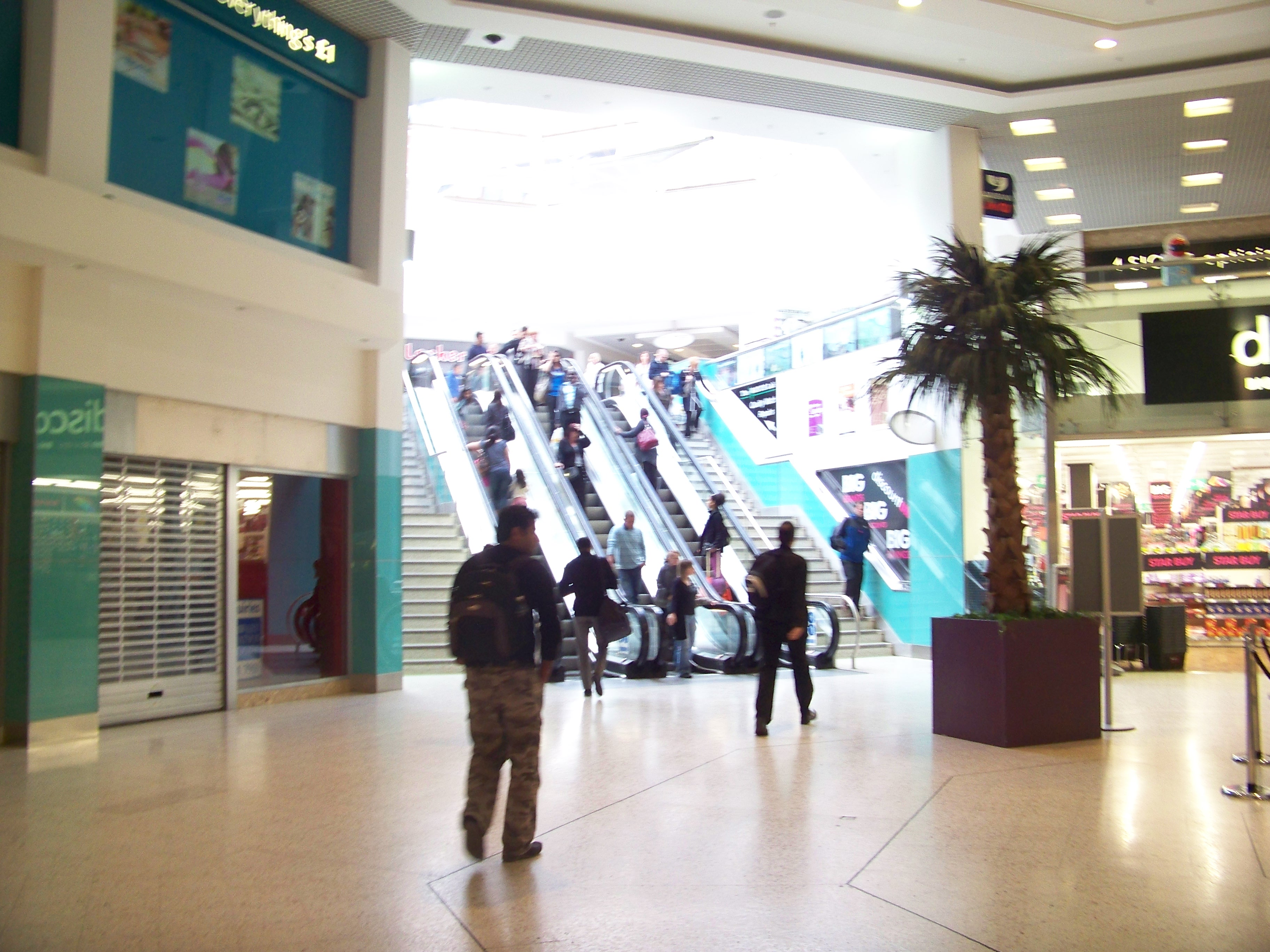
Escalators linking the lower and upper levels

== Parking ==
The centre has an attached large multi-storey car park with 24 hour access operated by Q-Park. It has a total of 282 parking spaces and can be access via Merrion Street to the rear of the centre; there is also direct access to the centre via lift.
