= The Headrow =

Street in Leeds, West Yorkshire, England

Coordinates: 53.7995°N 1.5450°W

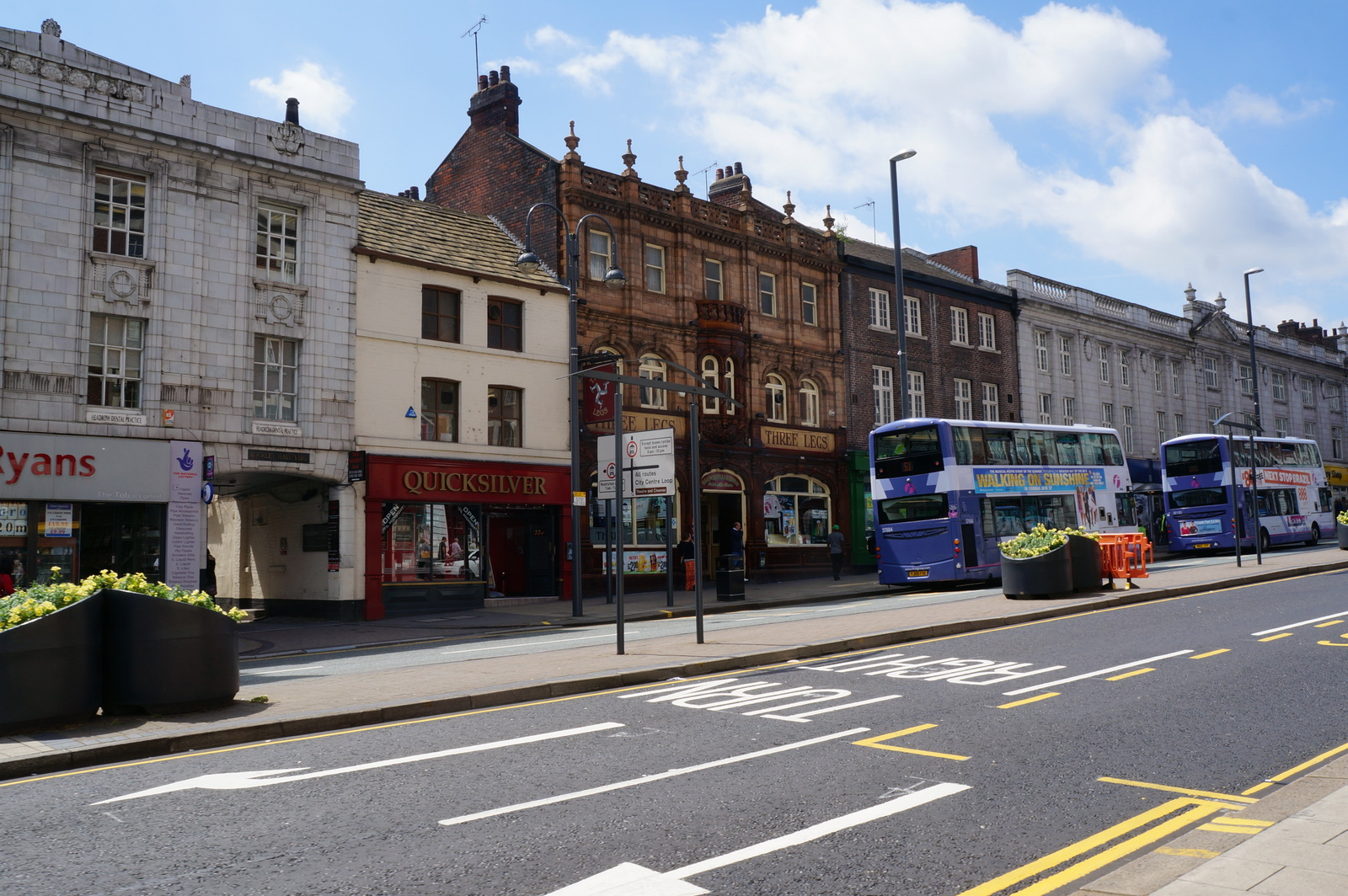
Shops on the older, south side of the Headrow

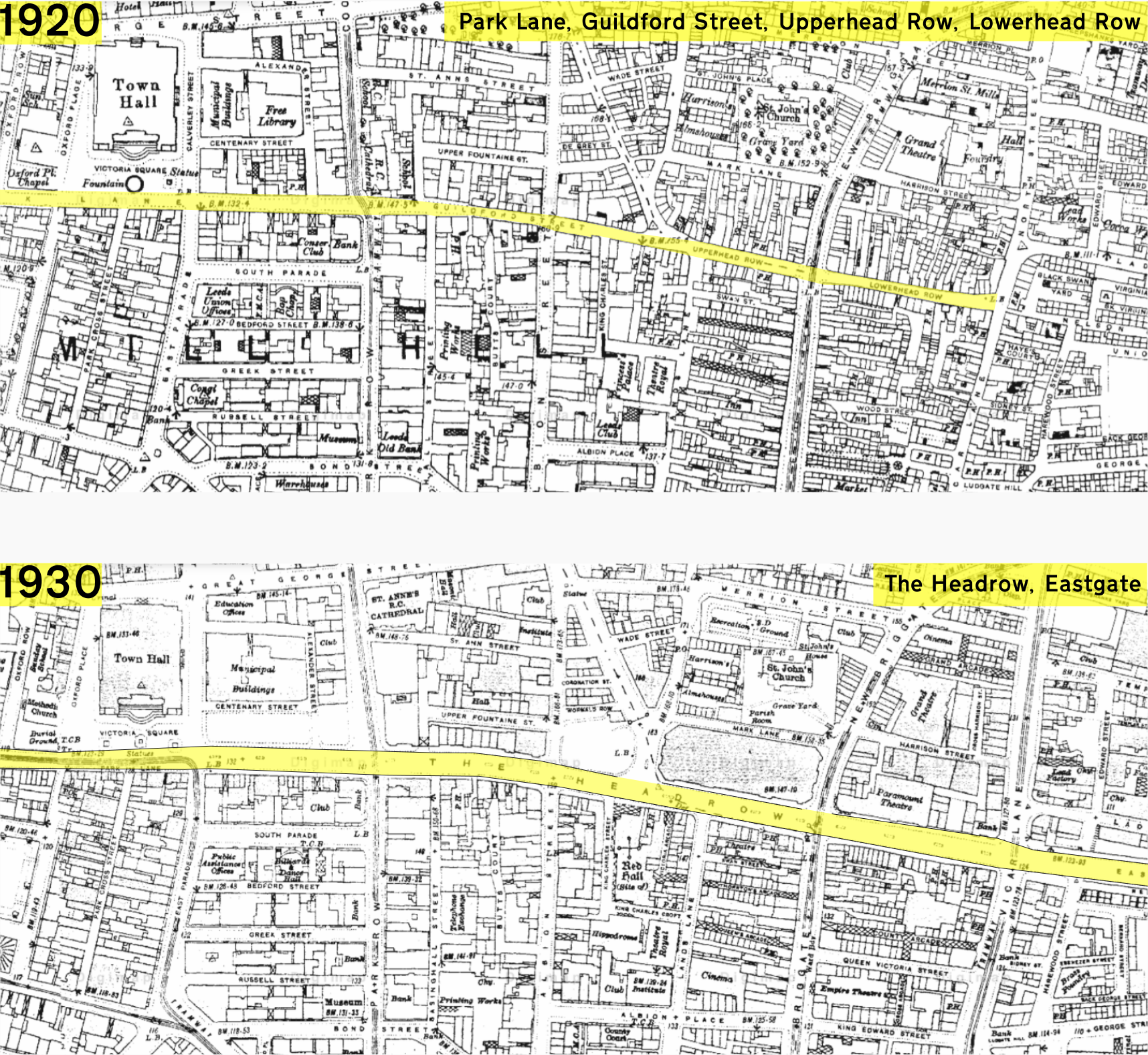
A section of the Ordnance Survey map of central Leeds of before and after the Headrow's creation, highlighting its route

The Headrow is an avenue in Leeds city centre, West Yorkshire, England.

It is one of the most important thoroughfares in central Leeds, hosting many of the city's civic and cultural buildings, including Leeds Town Hall, Leeds Central Library, Leeds Art Gallery, The Henry Moore Institute, and The Light. Some of the largest retail floorplates in the city are on The Headrow, particularly between Park Row and Briggate, where major chains have opened flagship stores. The Headrow is part of a longer axis that includes Westgate, Eastgate, and Quarry Hill.

The Headrow forms a spine across the city centre between Westgate and Eastgate and is approximately ½ mile (700 m) long. It was widened between 1928 and 1932 in a redevelopment designed by architect Reginald Blomfield, primarily as a way of improving traffic flow through city centre. The area has an advisory speed limit of 15 miles per hour (24 km/h). The section between Park Row and Briggate is reserved for buses and taxis and cars/motorcycles are not permitted to use it between 5 a.m. and 10 p.m.

== History ==
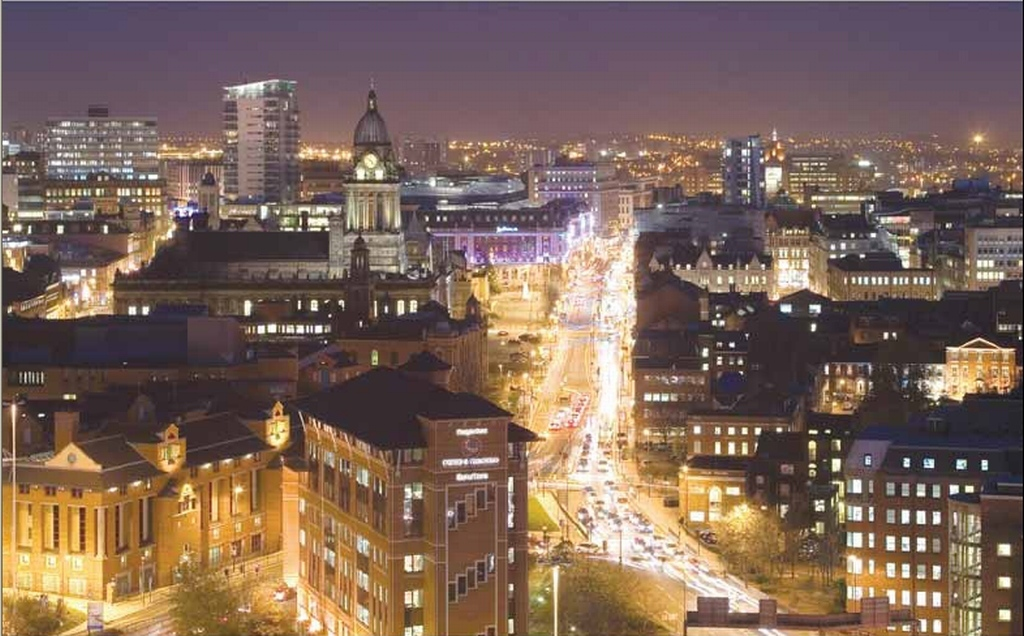
View down Westgate and the Headrow at night

Appearing on maps in 1560, the Headrow once formed the northern edge or "head" of medieval Leeds' boundary, hence its name. To the east the street crossed Sheepscar Beck, a tributary of the River Aire now culverted, and continued, known as "The Street", to York. In the 17th century it was renamed Parke Lane, Burley Bar, Upper Head Row and Lower Head Row. Renamed again in the 19th century, at the junction with Albion Street the street ran to the east as Upperhead Row and Lowerhead Row and to the west as Park Lane and Guildford Street – once home to St Anne's Cathedral which was demolished in November 1904 and relocated to Cookridge Street. More recently, running east-to-west, the street became Eastgate, the Headrow and Westgate, though portions of Park Lane remain at the far end of Westgate.

Developments included the construction of Permanent House, the headquarters of the Leeds Permanent Building Society, Lewis's department store and the Odeon Cinema, which opened as the Paramount Theatre. Headrow House was constructed in the 1950s. The redevelopment is designed in a uniform neo-baroque style similar to Regent Street in London also designed by Reginald Blomfield. The buildings are clad in red brick and Portland stone as opposed to Portland stone only on Regent Street. The development of the Headrow as a road-widening scheme meant that the north side was constructed in the uniform style while the south side has a mixture of buildings from the 1800s to the present.

The Odeon, which was the last picture palace in the city centre, closed due to competition with local multiplexes and the impending opening of a thirteen screen multiplex at The Light retail and leisure complex originally operated by Ster Century and now Vue, it closed in 2001. The building which was originally to be converted to an apartment & leisure complex but was almost immediately bought by Primark who converted it into a large three storey clothes store that opened in August 2005. Primark vacated the building in March 2015 and in August 2015 the building re-opened as a Sports Direct store.

== Retail ==
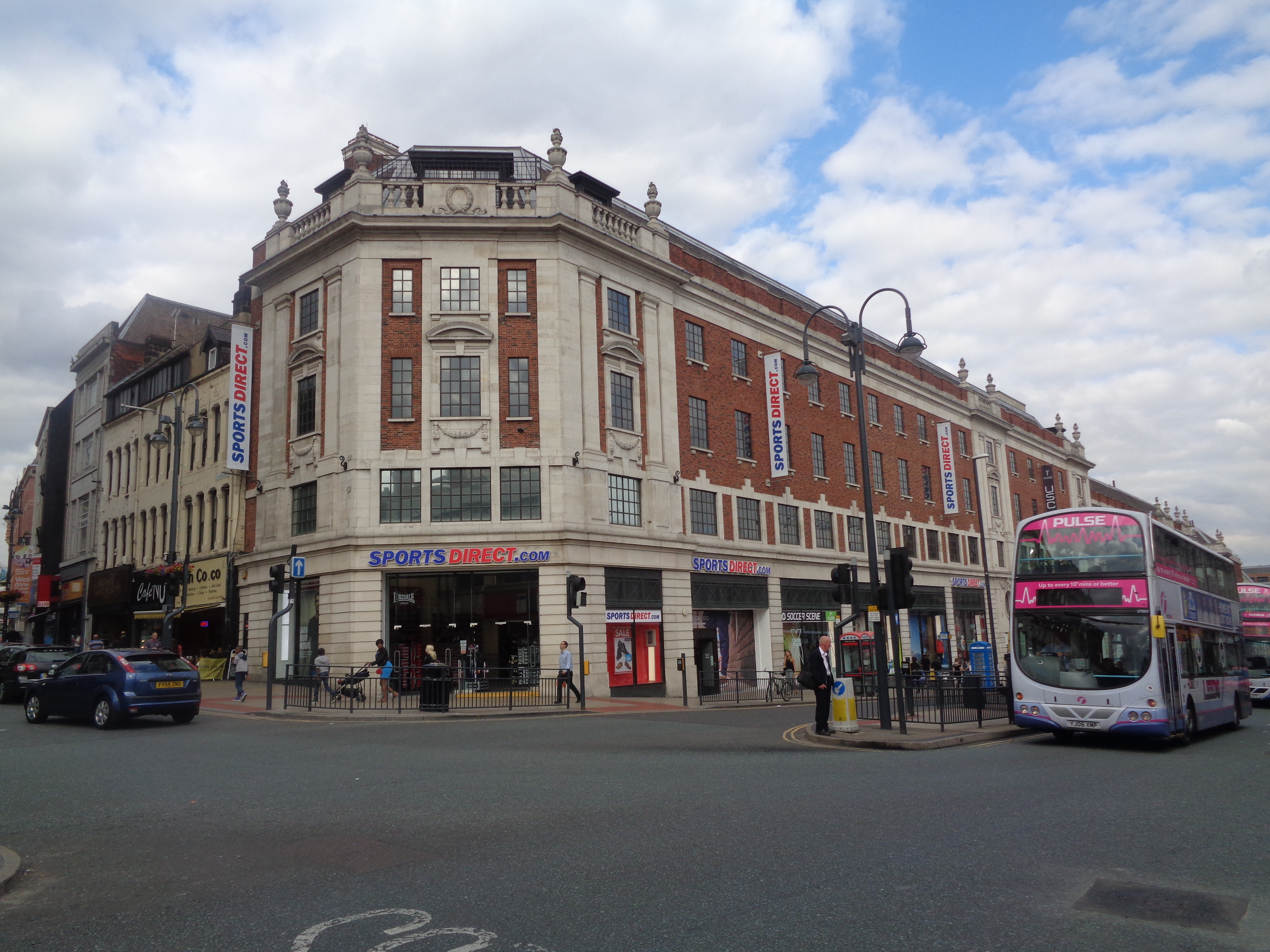
The former Odeon cinema, now Sports Direct

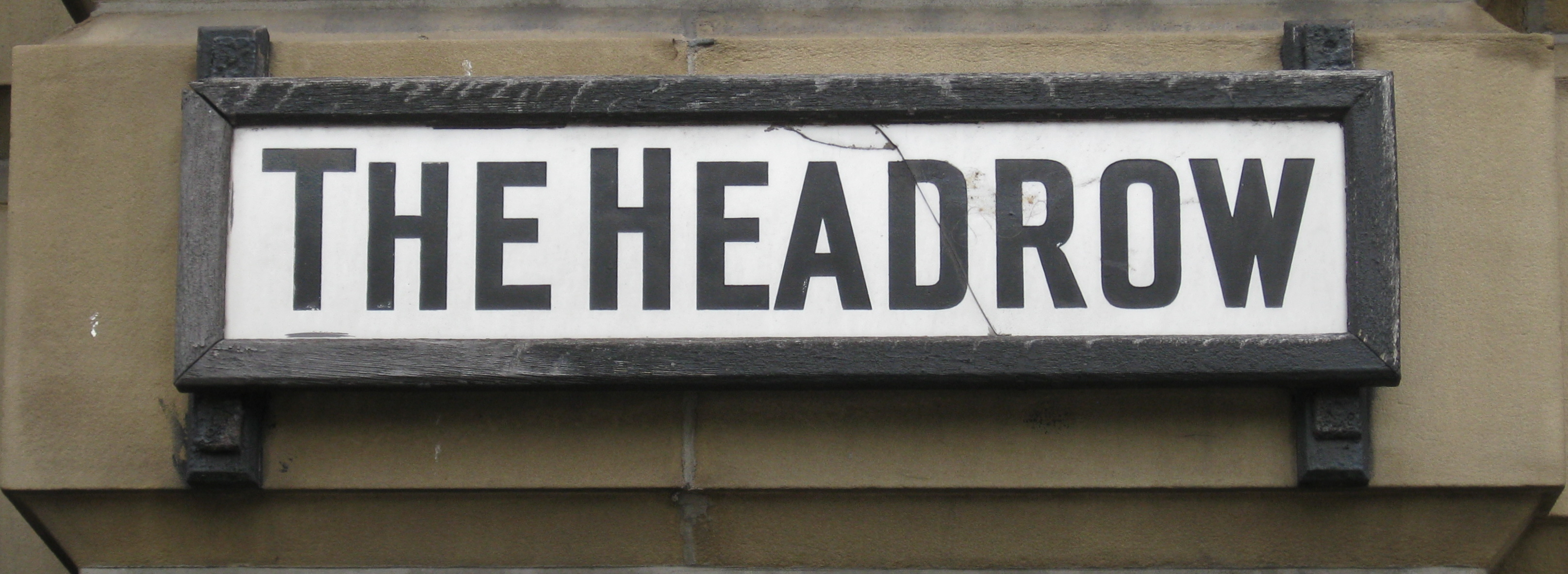
Street sign

Today the street is one of Leeds's principal shopping streets. The former Permanent House, now known as The Light on the north side, houses a cinema, restaurants and a Radisson BLU Hotel. There is ground floor retail in Direct Line House (originally Headrow House) on Dortmund Square. St John's Shopping Centre and The Headrow Centre flank opposite sides of Dortmund Square, on The Headrow.

Broad Gate was built in 1932 and occupied by Lewis's from 1932-1996, it was then occupied by Allders from 1996-2005. After the closure of Allders in 2005, Broad Gate was closed for refurbishment. Since 2008, half of the Broad Gate building has been transformed into offices and the other half has remained open to the public as separate retail units occupied by retailers including Sainsbury's, T.K. Maxx, Argos and Clas Ohlson. In 2016 Clas Ohlson was closed and In 2017 the unit was re-opened by Home Sense.

Opposite the former Odeon cinema is Crash Records, which has been a fixture of the Leeds music scene for over 30 years.

== Attractions ==
Part of the Headrow, including Leeds War Memorial, Leeds Art Gallery and Leeds Town Hall

The Light houses a 13-screen multiplex cinema operated by Vue and a Virgin Active Gym, Radisson BLU Hotel and restaurants and bars. There are several art galleries on The Headrow axis, including the major Leeds City Art Gallery, Henry Moore Institute and New Briggate gallery.

=== Victoria Gardens ===
At the western end of the Headrow is Victoria Gardens, Leeds' Speakers' Corner, best known as the location of the war memorial, and where justice and anti-war rallies have gathered and terminated. The area is surrounded by Leeds Town Hall, Leeds City Art Gallery, The Henry Moore Institute and Leeds Central Library. The mother church of the Methodist District of Leeds, Oxford Place Methodist Mission, fronts the western side, while The Light shopping centre is on the eastern side.

=== Dortmund Square ===
In 1980, the area between Headrow House and Lewis's store was converted to Dortmund Square. To celebrate ten years of twinning, the people of Dortmund presented the people of Leeds with a bronze statue of a Dortmund drayman, sculpted by Arthur Shulze-Engels, which stands in the square.
