= The Light, Leeds =

Building in Leeds, West Yorkshire, England

Coordinates: 53.7999°N 1.5467°W

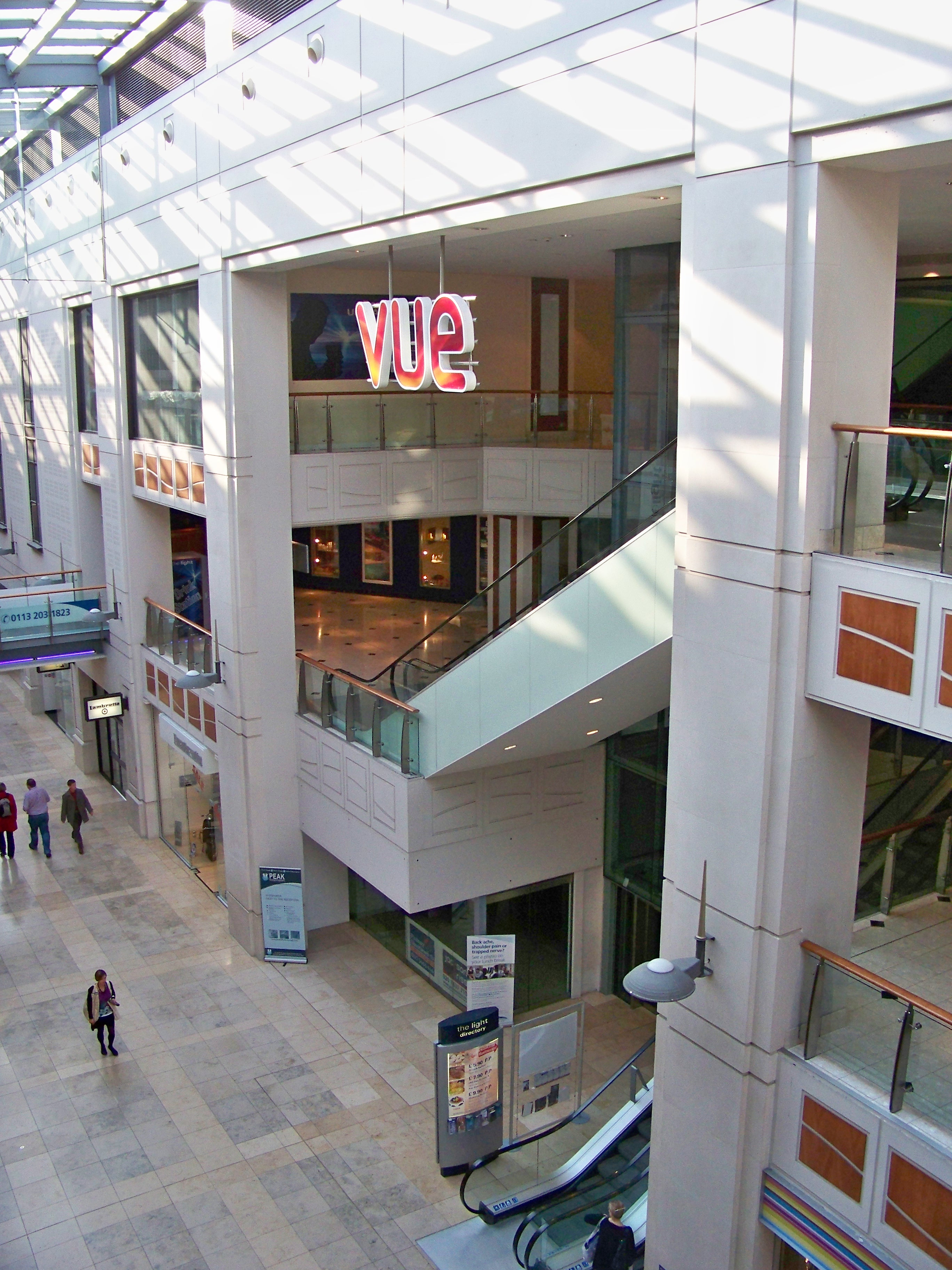
Interior showing promenade and cinema

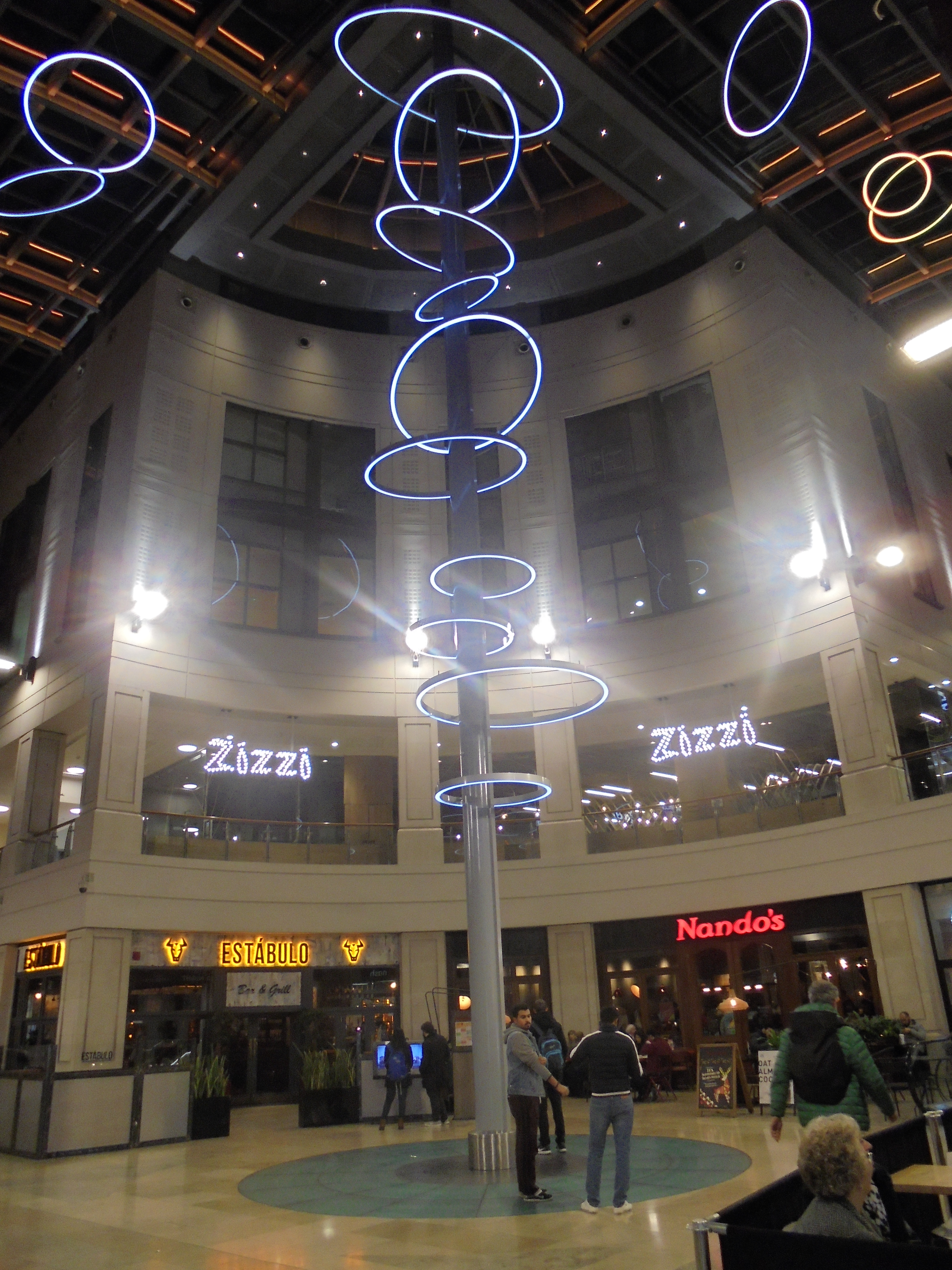
Interior junction of the two streets in the evening

The Light is a leisure and retail centre in central Leeds in West Yorkshire, England. It occupies the rectangular space between The Headrow on the south, St Anne's Street on the north, Cookridge Street on the west, and Albion Street. Two former streets divide it: Upper Fountaine Street (east-west) and Cross Fountaine Street (north-south) now covered with a glass roof. It incorporates two listed buildings Permanent House and the Headrow Buildings.

== Structure ==
The Light opened in 2001 with a retail area of 32,515 square metres (349,990 sq ft). In 2002 the £100 million development won two City of Leeds Awards for Architecture and Lighting: the Altered Building Award and The People's Award.

The retail and leisure centre was created by building a glass roof over Upper Fountaine Street and Cross Fountaine Street to create an arcade between two listed buildings, Permanent House and the Headrow Buildings. New construction on two levels created a first level promenade with a multi-screen cinema. Above the ground floor shops and restaurants are a nightclub and health club. It was designed by DLG Architects.

Permanent House and the Headrow Buildings are of the same style in Portland stone and brick by Sir Reginald Blomfield and local architect C. W. Atkinson. The Headrow Buildings fronts the Headrow and Permanent House is on the corner with Cookridge Street. The Headrow Buildings have five stepped stages to accommodate the slope of the Headrow and an arch surmounted by Doric columns over Cross Fountaine Street. The height of the cornices was set to match that of Lewis's department store building. It had nine shop units and four floors of offices. Permanent House, which houses the Radisson Blu Hotel, was constructed as two linked buildings on Cookridge Street, separated by Upper Fountaine Street which was bridged and the buildings are joined by a carriage arch. The headquarters of the Leeds Permanent Building Society was opened 15 May 1930 on the corner of Cookridge Street and the Headrow. The north part was opened 31 December 1931 as shops and offices. Browns Restaurant occupies the former banking hall.

== Gallery ==
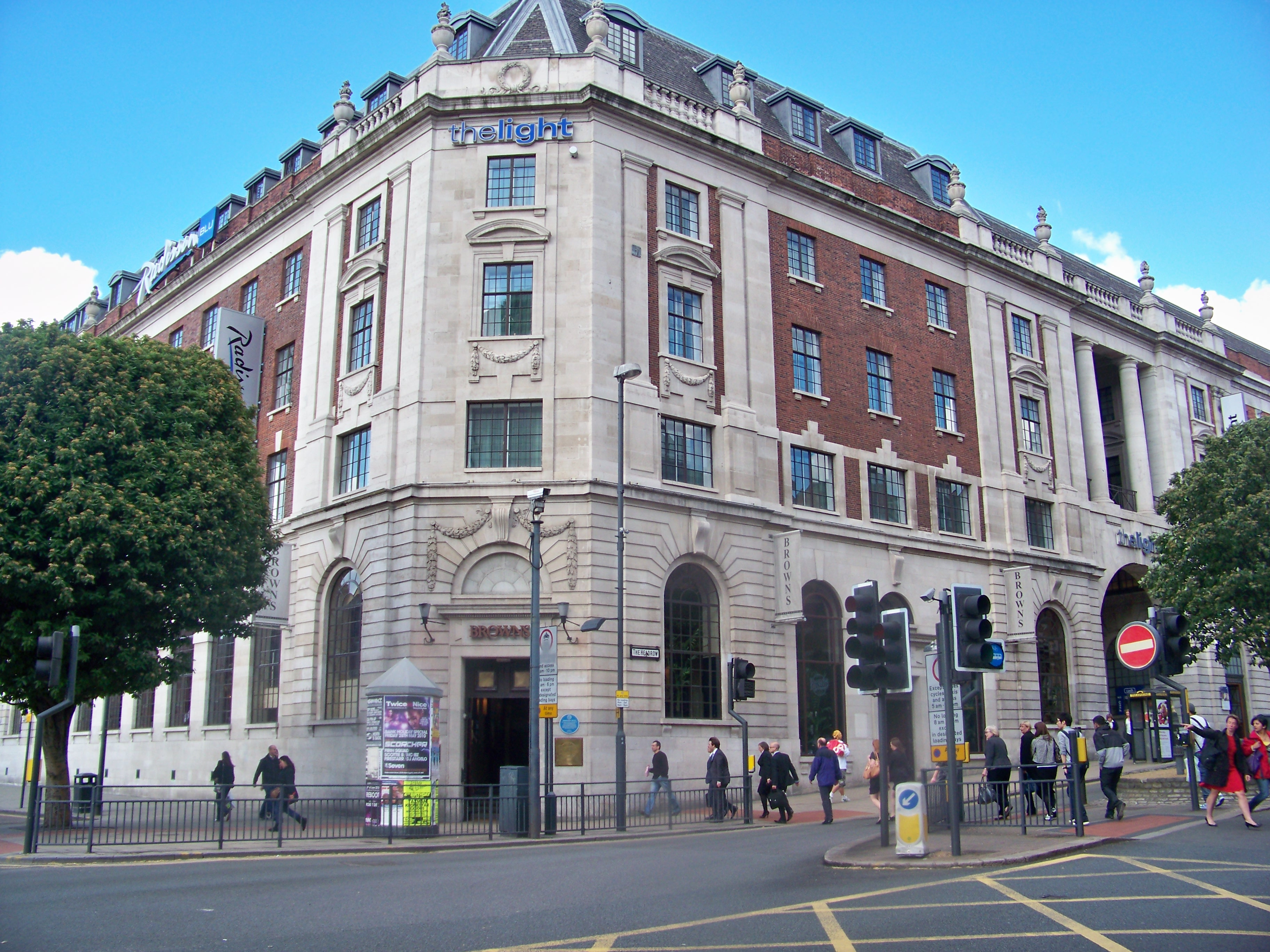
Permanent House, corner of Cookridge Street and the Headrow

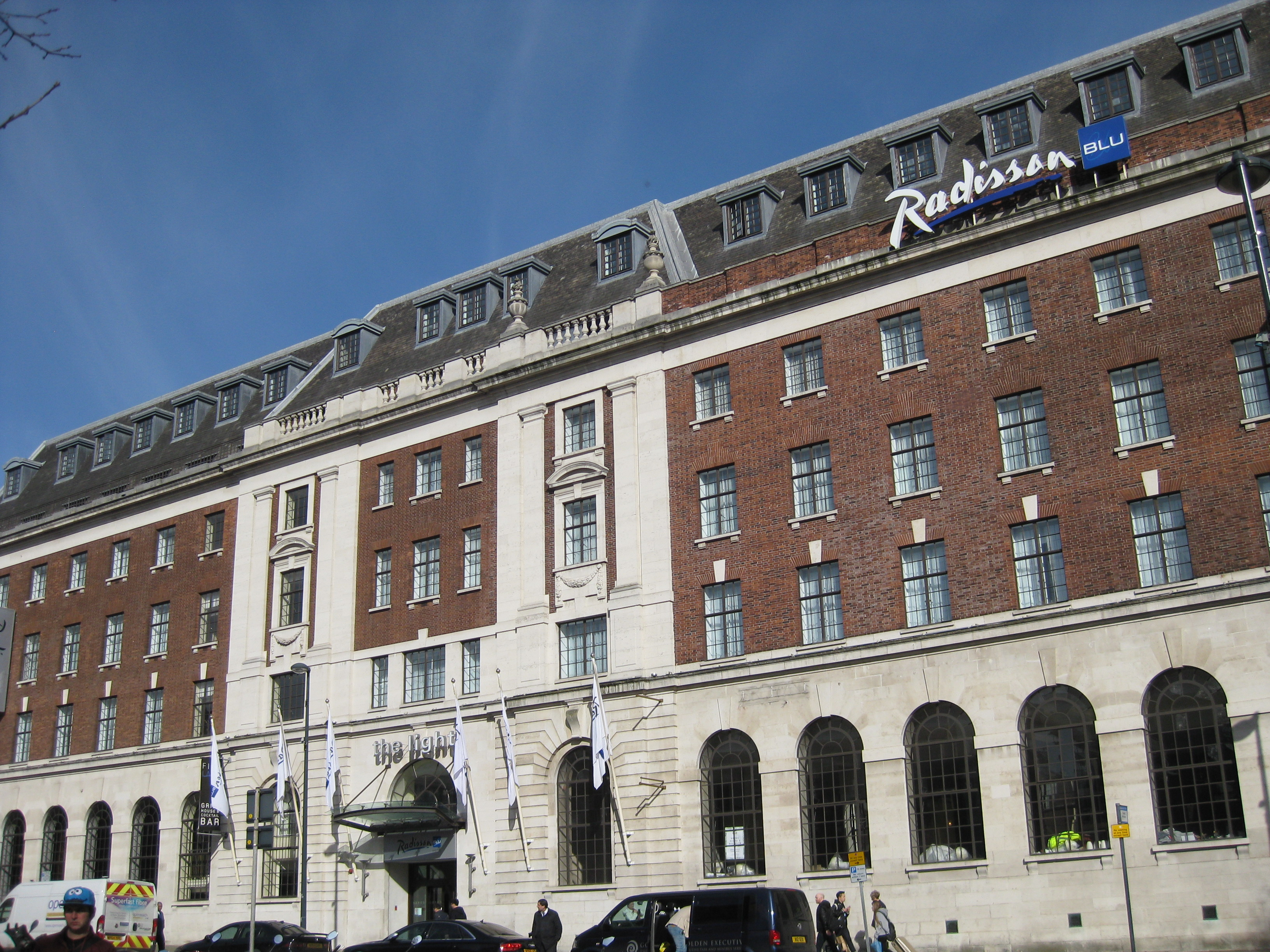
Permanent House, Cookridge Street showing the link and arch

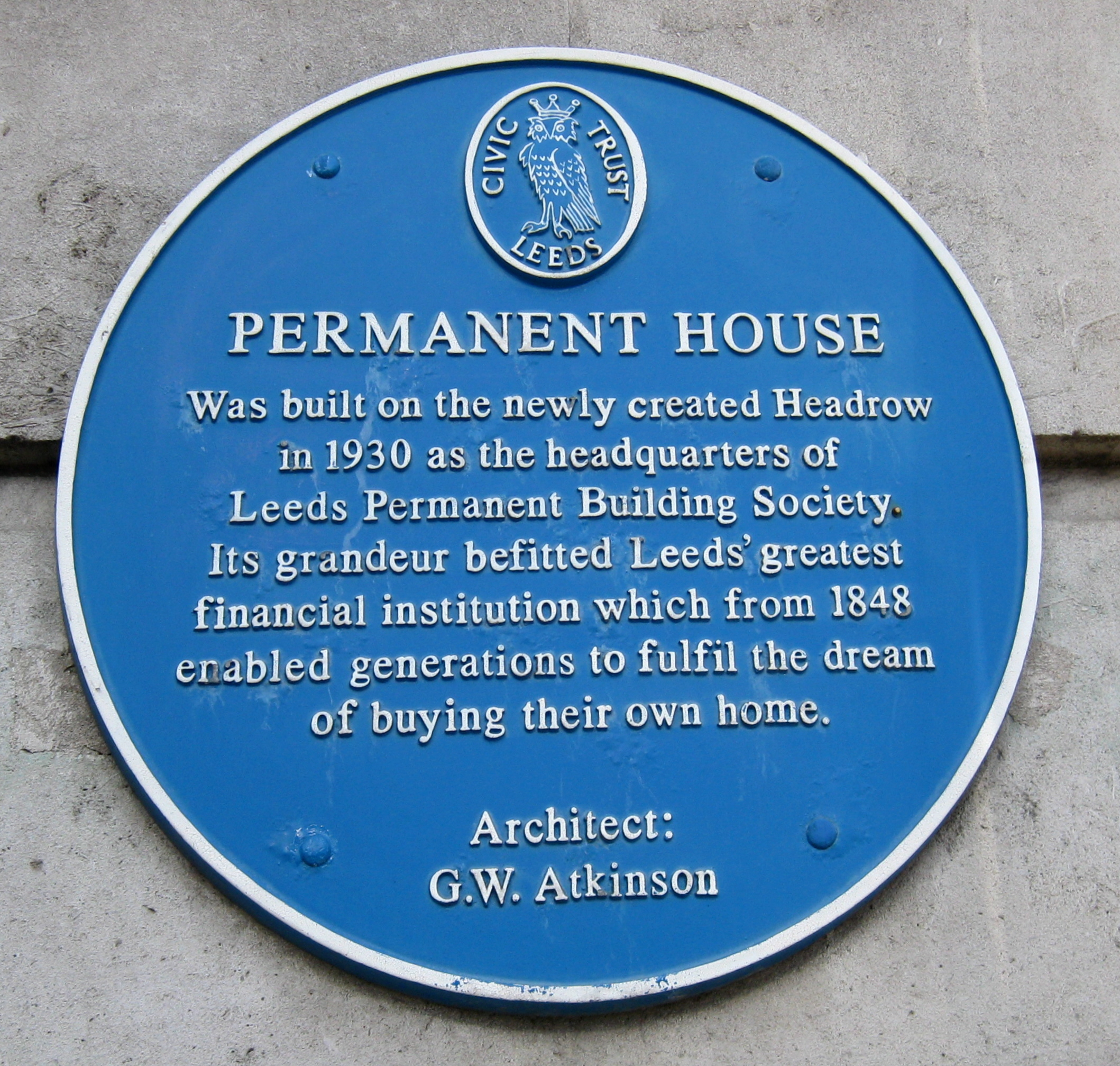
Blue plaque on Permanent House

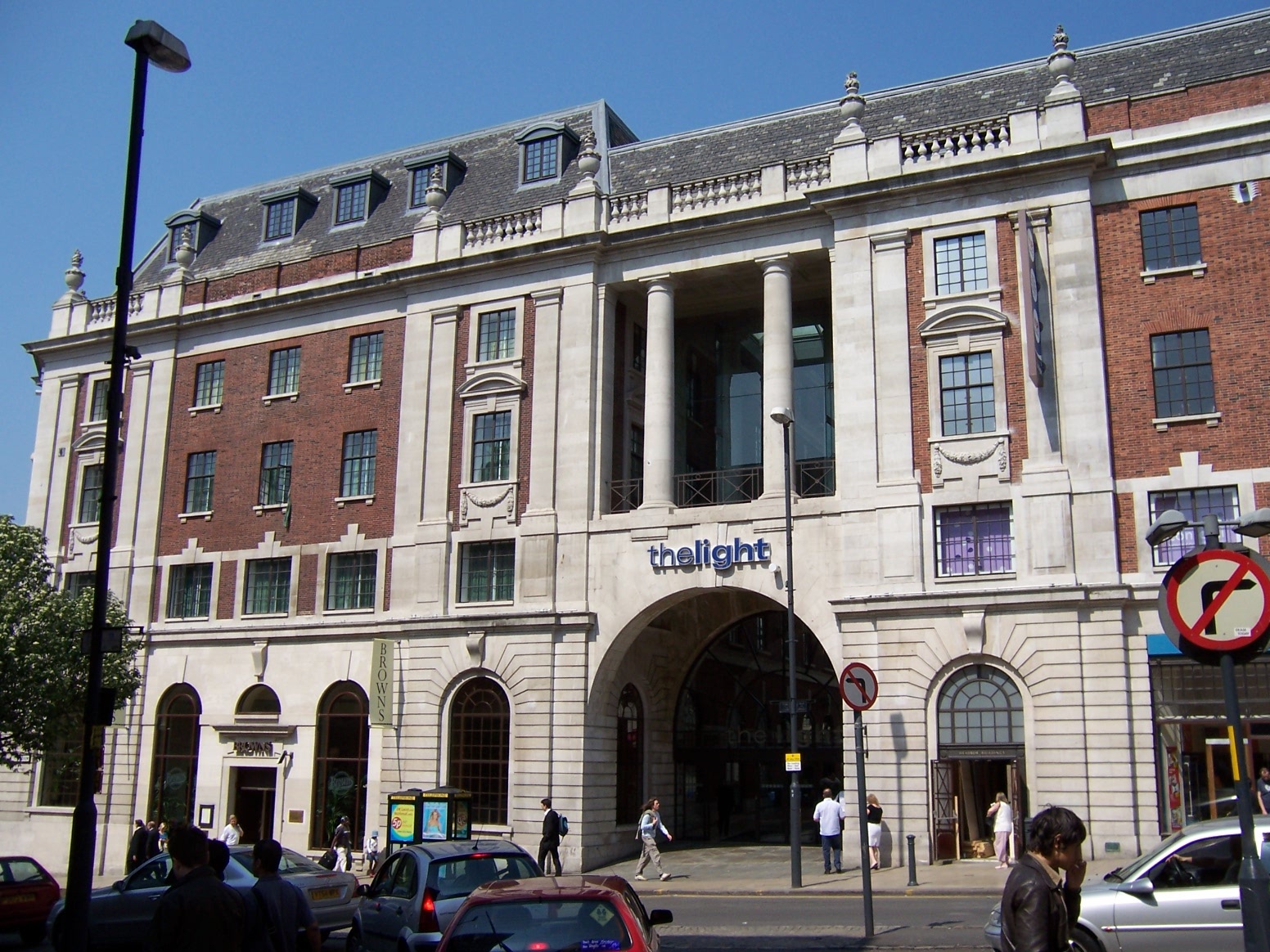
Headrow Buildings entrance to Cross Fountaine Street

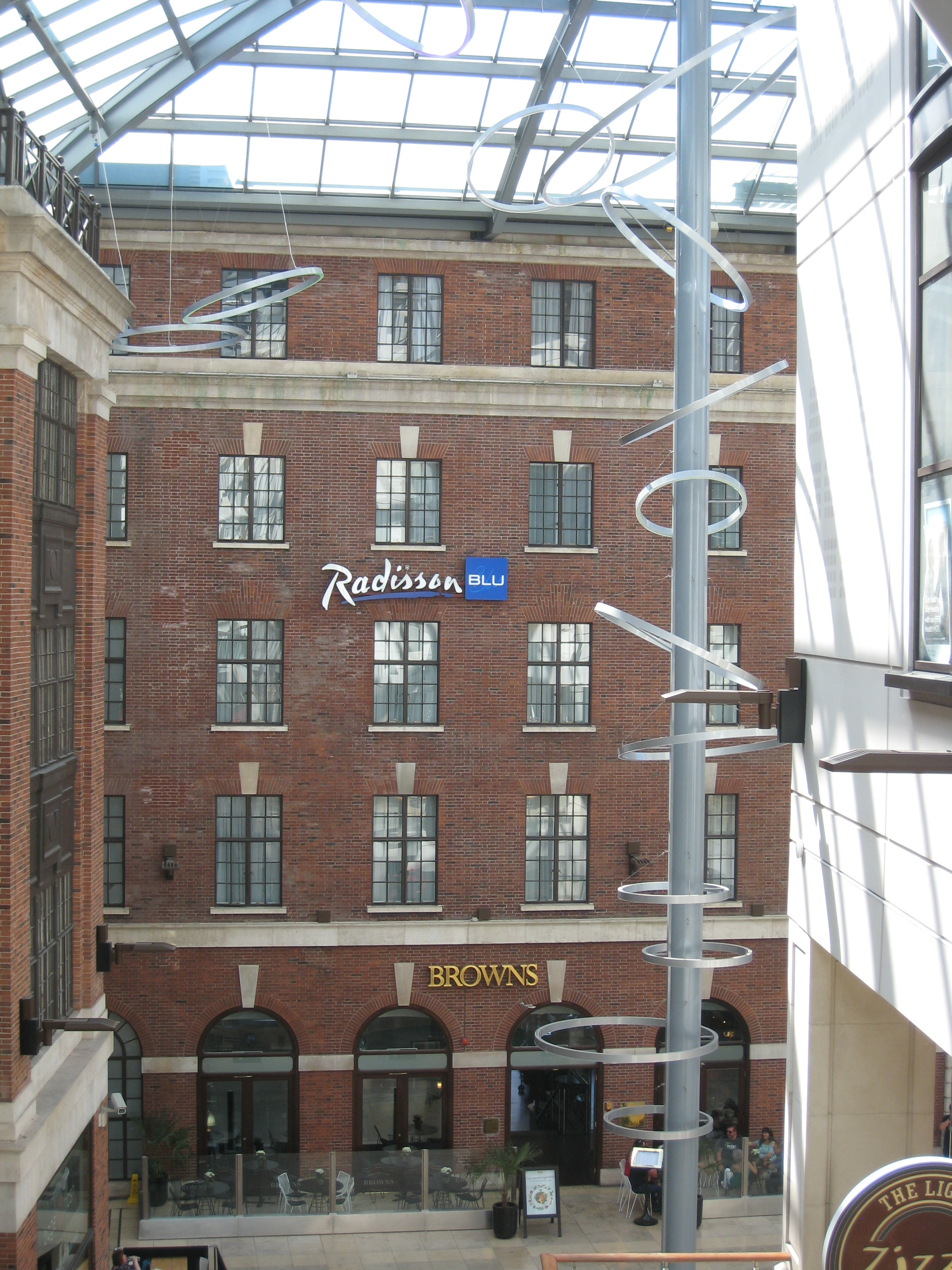
Entrance to Browns and Radisson Blue inside the Light

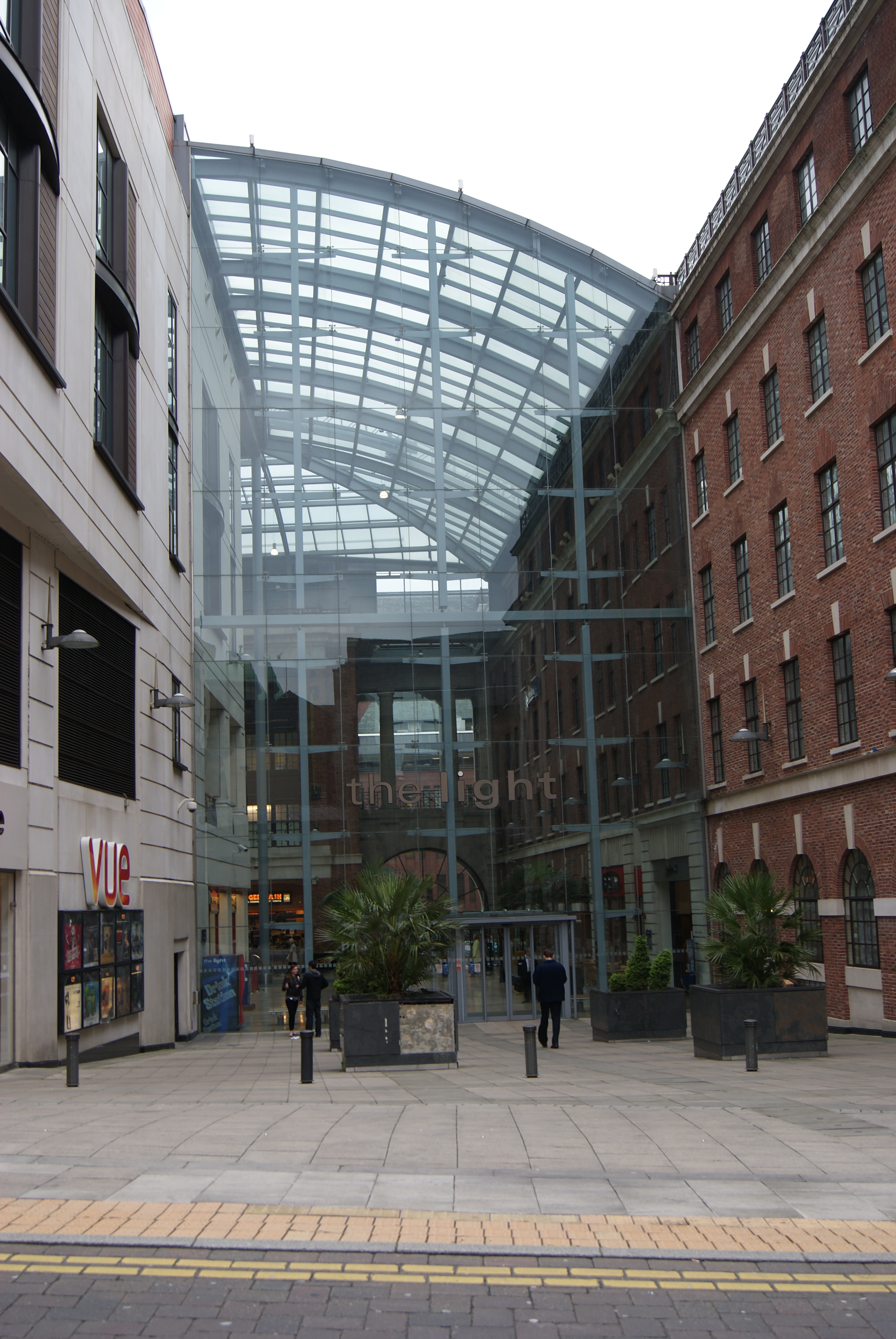
North entrance from St Anne's Street
