= Leeds Permanent Building Society =

English building society (founded 1848)

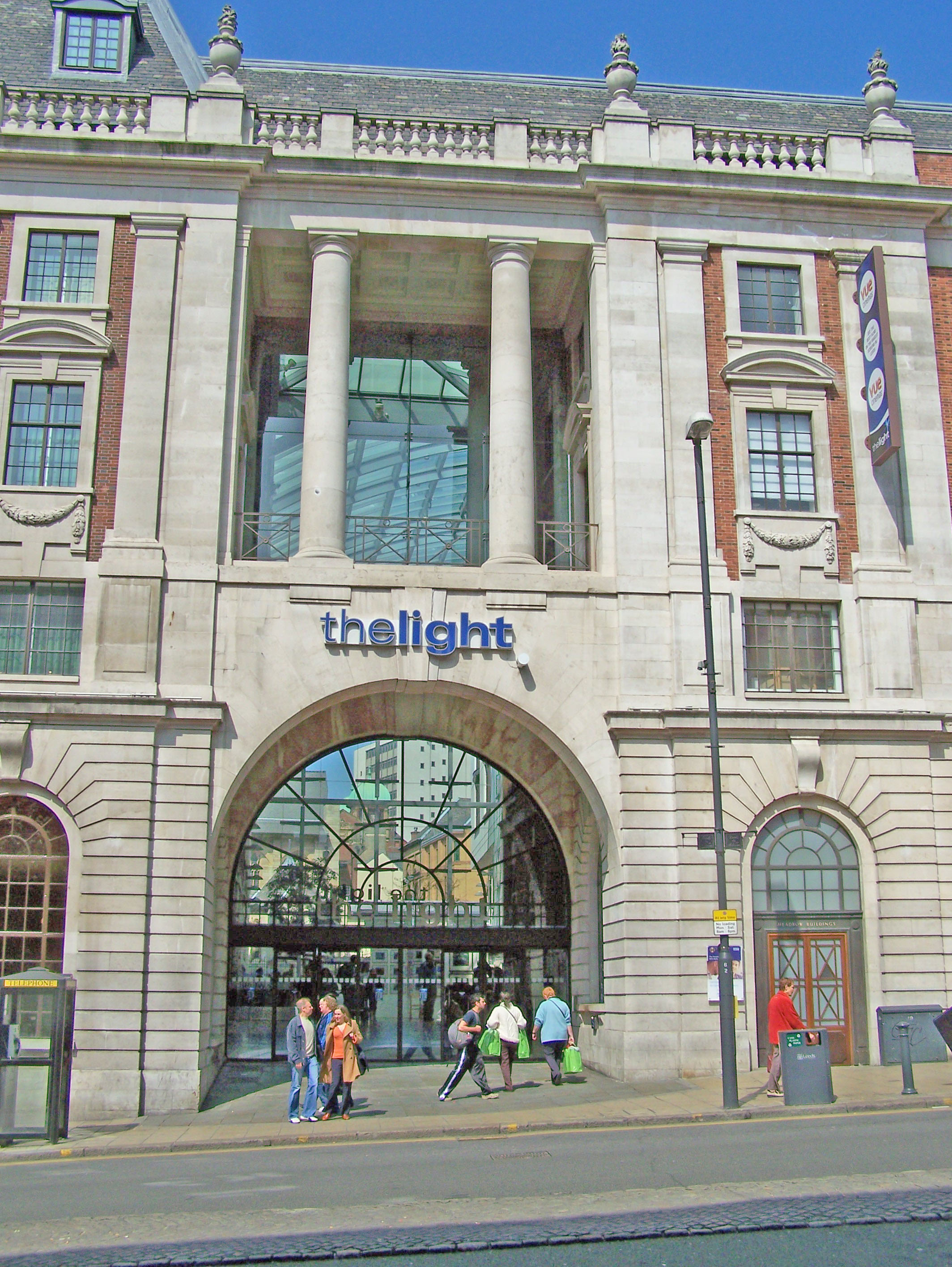
- The former Leeds Permanent Building Society HQ on The Headrow in Leeds City Centre
- Founded: 1848
- Defunct: 1995
- Fate: Merged with the Halifax Building Society
- Headquarters: Leeds, England

The Leeds Permanent Building Society was a building society founded in Leeds, England in 1848 and was commonly known in a shortened form as The Leeds or The Perm.

== History ==
=== 1848-1948 ===
Before the formation of “The Leeds” there had been an earlier terminating society, the Leeds Building and Investment Society, but its ability to expand was restricted by its terminating structure. To obviate this, the promoters and trustees decided to form a permanent society in 1848, namely the Permanent Second Leeds Benefit Building and Investment Society, shortened in 1851 to Leeds Permanent Benefit Building Society.

The Society's first offices were located in Exchange Buildings in Lands Lane, where business was conducted from 10am to 4pm, and also 7pm to 9pm on Tuesdays. They later moved to 32 Park Row, and then in 1876, to premises at the corner of Park Lane and Calverley, where the Society was to remain for the next 50 years.

The Society had a rapid start and within six months more than eight agencies had been established. By the end of its first year there were 1200 members. Ten years later there were 3500 members and assets of £175,000, and the Society was printing leaflets claiming to be the “largest in the world”. In 1863 the Leeds accepted an invitation to open a branch in Sheffield but the history does not indicate any other branches in its early years. Figures given for membership were 6370 in 1868 and a big jump to more than 16,000 in 1878, by which time assets had reached £1.2m. Growth appeared to slow down for 36 years later, in 1914, assets had only reached £1.9m.

The inter-war period saw rapid growth at the Leeds. By 1927 the Society's history referred to “branch offices and agencies in all parts of the country”. There was representation in most towns in England and a number in Scotland and Ireland. Although there was extensive use of agents the Society believed that all the large towns should have branches, and 21 were listed. By 1938 investors totalled 250,000 compared with less than 20,000 in 1918. This growth was almost entirely organic. There had only been one small acquisition: the second Chatham Building Society in 1933.

In 1930, head office moved to newly constructed premises at the corner of Cookridge Street and The Headrow – Permanent House - designed by Sir Reginald Blomfield and local architect C.W. Atkinson.

=== Post 1948 ===
The post war period saw a series of acquisitions: in 1946, London & North Eastern Railway; 1952, Midlands; 1959, Doncaster; 1961, Aberdeen Property Investment; and 1970, Earlestown. The 1950s and 1960s also saw another phase of branch expansion, with the Leeds' 100th branch opening in 1970. Expansion to its Leeds Head Office took place in this period which included the construction of various adjacent annexes to its 1930s HQ including the 61 m tall Leeds Permanent Tower (these annexes were demolished as part of the works to create The Light around 2000).

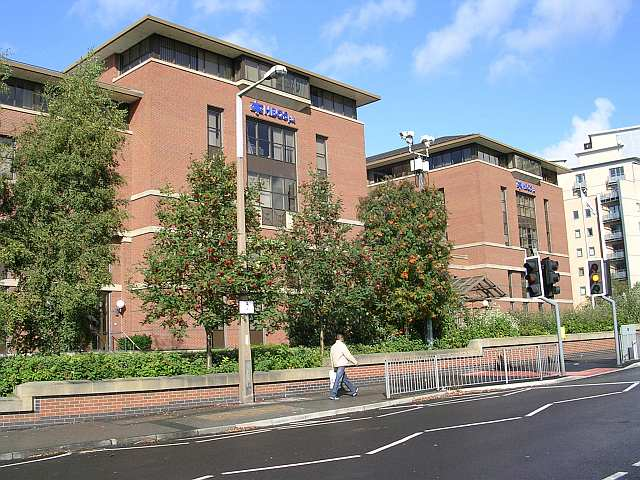
HBOS offices in Lovell Park, Leeds, formerly that of the Leeds Permanent Building Society, before their takeover by the Halifax in 1995

Technology too was beginning to make an impact. In 1964 the board approved a research project to investigate the conversion of mechanical accounting to electronic data processing. The Society's first computer was subsequently installed in 1967.

It had a notable television advertising campaign featuring George Cole in the 1980s which featured the slogan Laughing all the way to The Leeds.

Like many other Building Societies, the Leeds later took advantage of changes brought by the Building Societies Act 1986, diversifying its business into share-selling, off-shore banking, estate agency and property development.

Further amalgamations included the Southdown Building Society which proceeded in 1992, after it got into financial difficulties.

Permanent House was the society's home until the move to new premises in Lovell Park opened by Prince Philip, Duke of Edinburgh, in 1993.

The Leeds Permanent Building Society trading name ceased to be used after the society merged with the Halifax Building Society in 1995.

== Arms ==
Coat of arms of Leeds Permanent Building Society
Notes Granted 12 January 1949 Crest On a wreath Argent and Azure upon the battlements of a tower an owl Proper holding with the dexter claw a key Or. Escutcheon Per chevron Sable and Azure in chief two mullets and in base a triple-towered castle Argent. Supporters On either side an owl Proper gorged with a collar pendent therefrom by a chain an escutcheon Gules charged with a rose Argent barbed and seeded Proper. Motto Safe And Sound
