= Rushbond =

British property company

Rushbond plc

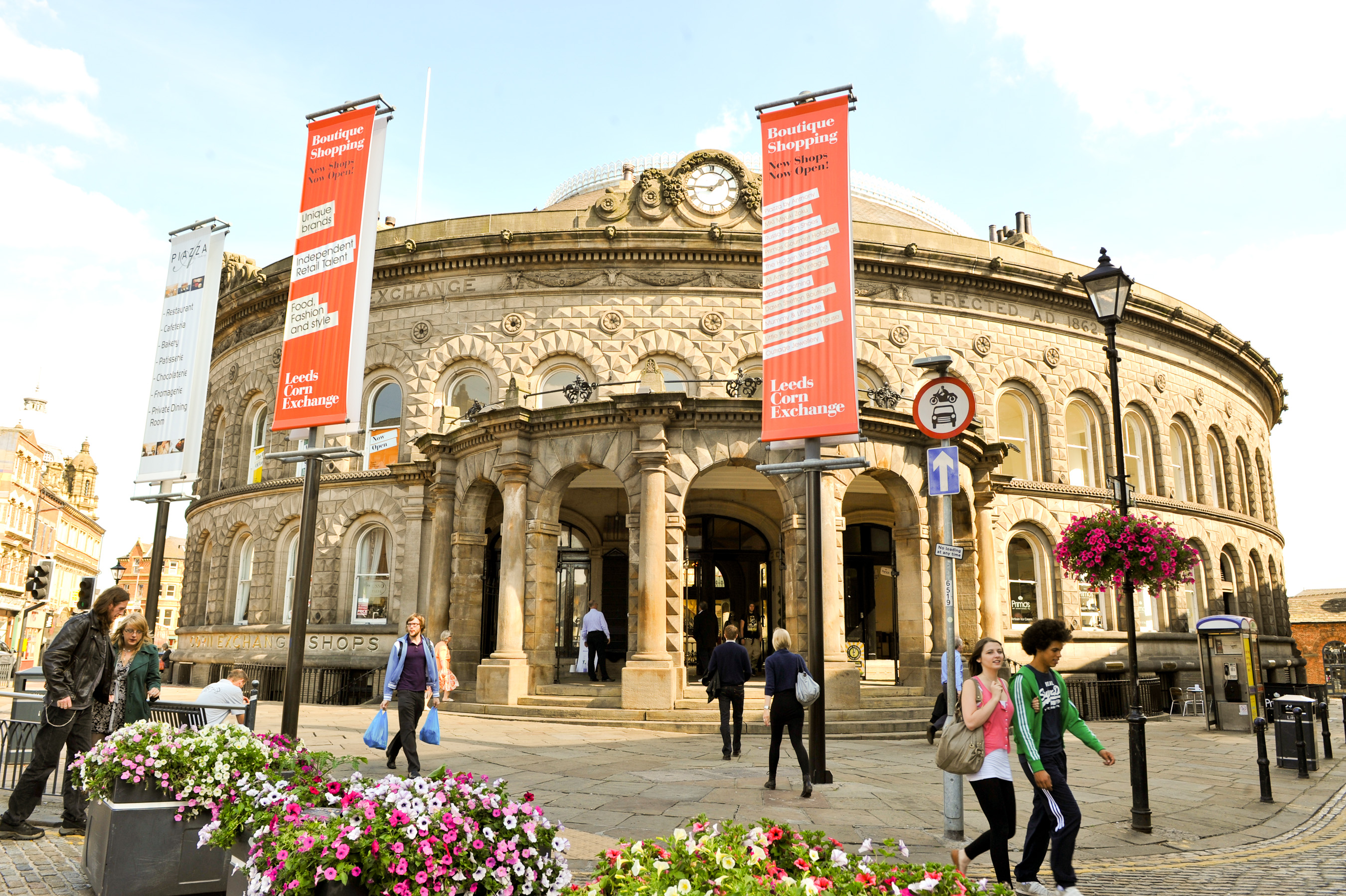
- Leeds Corn Exchange, an investment owned and managed by Rushbond
- Company type: Public limited company
- Industry: Real estate
- Founded: 8 July 1986; 39 years ago
- Founder: Jonathan W Maud
- Headquarters: Hawthorn Park, Leeds, West Yorkshire, England
- Key people: Georgina Maud (arts & creative); Mark Finch (real estate director)
- Revenue: ▼£6,730,021 (2019)
- Operating income: ▼£6,564,942 (2019)
- Total assets: ▲£135,646,163 (2019)
- Owner: Jonathan W Maud (100%)
- Number of employees: 19 (2019)
- Website: rushbond.co.uk

Rushbond plc is an unlisted commercial and residential property development and investment company in the United Kingdom. It was founded in Leeds, West Yorkshire in 1986 by Jonathan W Maud and exclusively operates around the Leeds City Region, into which it invested £14.3 million in 2019. The company, though specialising in the conversion and redevelopment of listed heritage buildings, also engages in the construction of new-build property and acquisitions.

Rushbond is the owner of a number of landmark buildings within Leeds, including the Corn Exchange, Majestic Cinema, and First White Cloth Hall, as well as Bretton Hall, Wakefield, St Leonard's Place, York and Centenary Square, Bradford. Considered within the industry to have a focus on creativity and design quality, Rushbond also involves itself in corporate social responsibility supporting a variety of community initiatives, partnering particularly with Meanwood Valley Urban Farm, and contributes to public art, funding projects such as Ian Randall's Steeped Vessels (2006) at Brewery Wharf, and Tim Etchells's neon artwork Where the Heart Is (2014), located on the Algernon Firth student residential building.

== History ==
The entrepreneur Jonathan Maud incorporated the company on 8 July 1986 and remains its managing director and sole owner. Maud appeared in the 2009 Sunday Times Rich List ranked at #1,771 (#1,794 in 2008) with a worth of £30M (£40M in 2008), and was named at 82nd in the Yorkshire Rich List in 2017, with wealth risen to £67M.

In 2014, Rushbond established an arts scholarship programme with Leeds Beckett University, known as the Rushbond Arts Scholarship. It is donated annually to School of Art, Architecture and Design undergraduates to support their early careers.

One of Rushbond's buildings, the former Majestic Cinema on City Square, gained prominence after being gutted during a large fire in September 2014, just after the completion of works to restore and convert it into mixed leisure and retail use. A scheme to construct a new interior of high-quality office space and additional floors began in 2018, with the building becoming the new national headquarters of Channel 4 in 2021.

Another focus of investment is the eastern side of Leeds city centre, with plans for the revitalisation of Kirkgate, Leeds's oldest street, resulting in the complete reconstruction of the Grade II* listed First White Cloth Hall, as well as ownership of Cuthbert Brodrick's 1863 Corn Exchange as a retail destination and New York House near Kirkgate Market.

== Property portfolio ==
This gallery is not an exhaustive list of properties owned

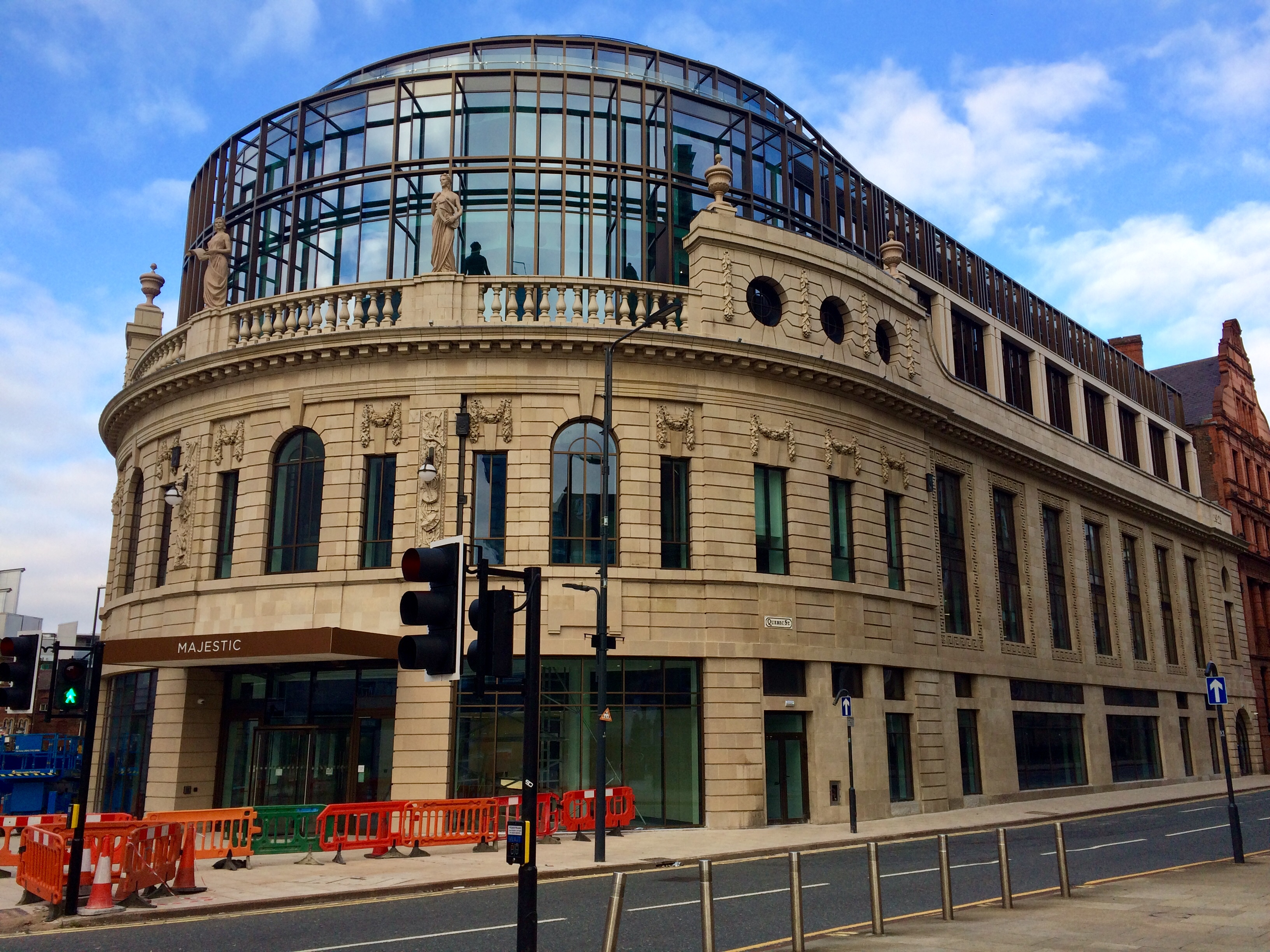
The Majestic, Leeds

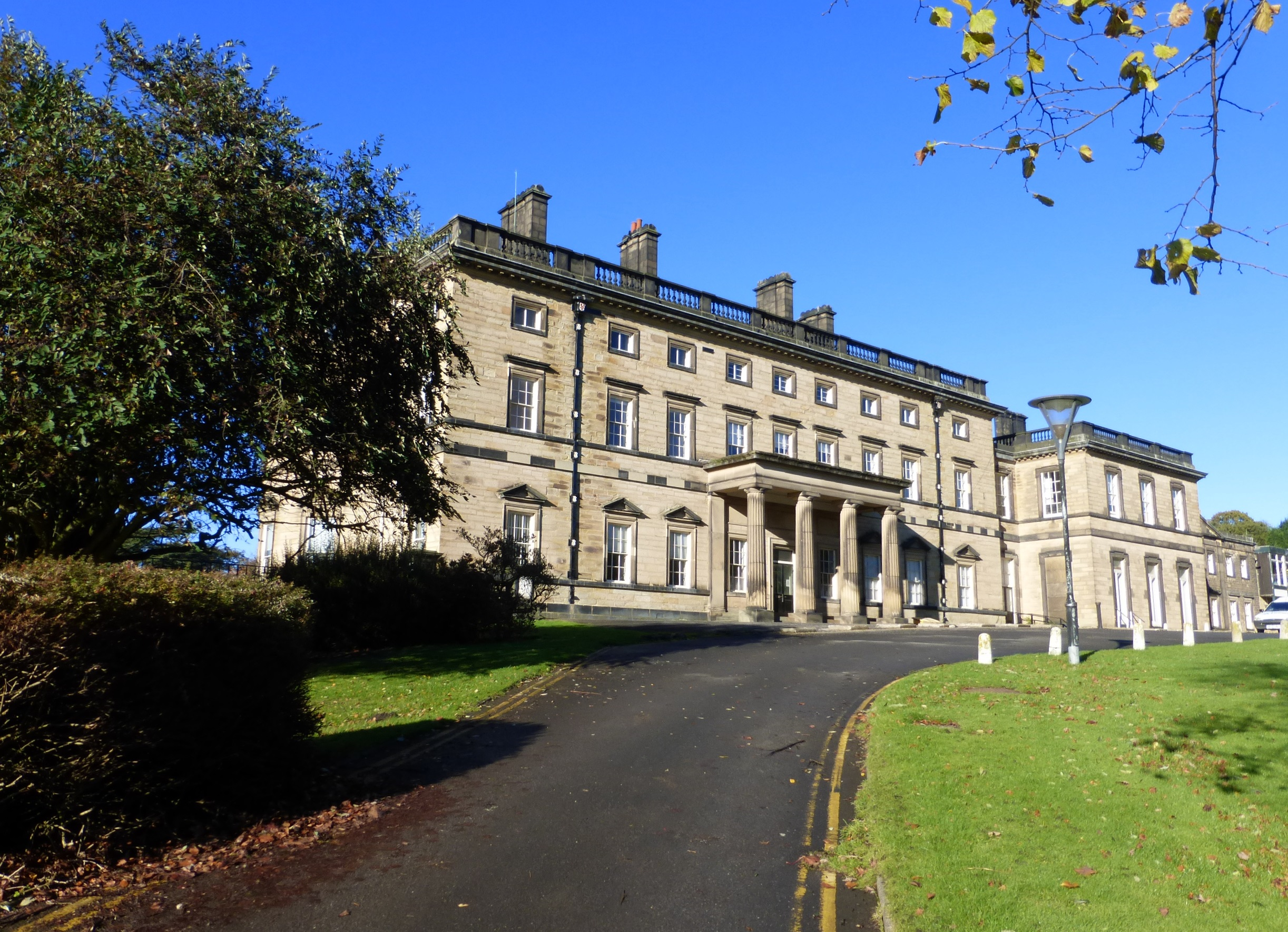
Bretton Hall

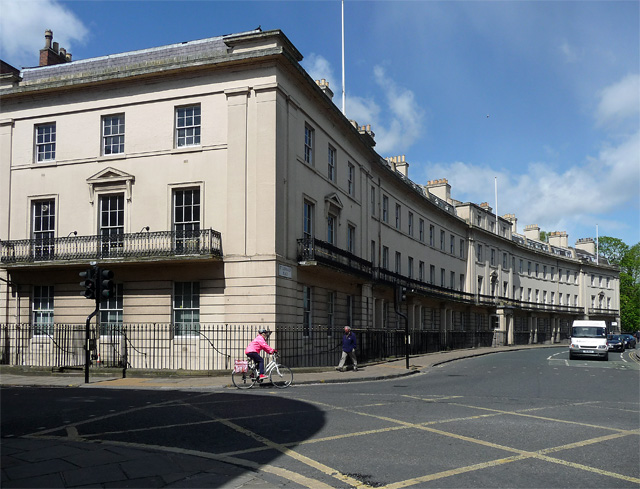
St Leonard's Place, York

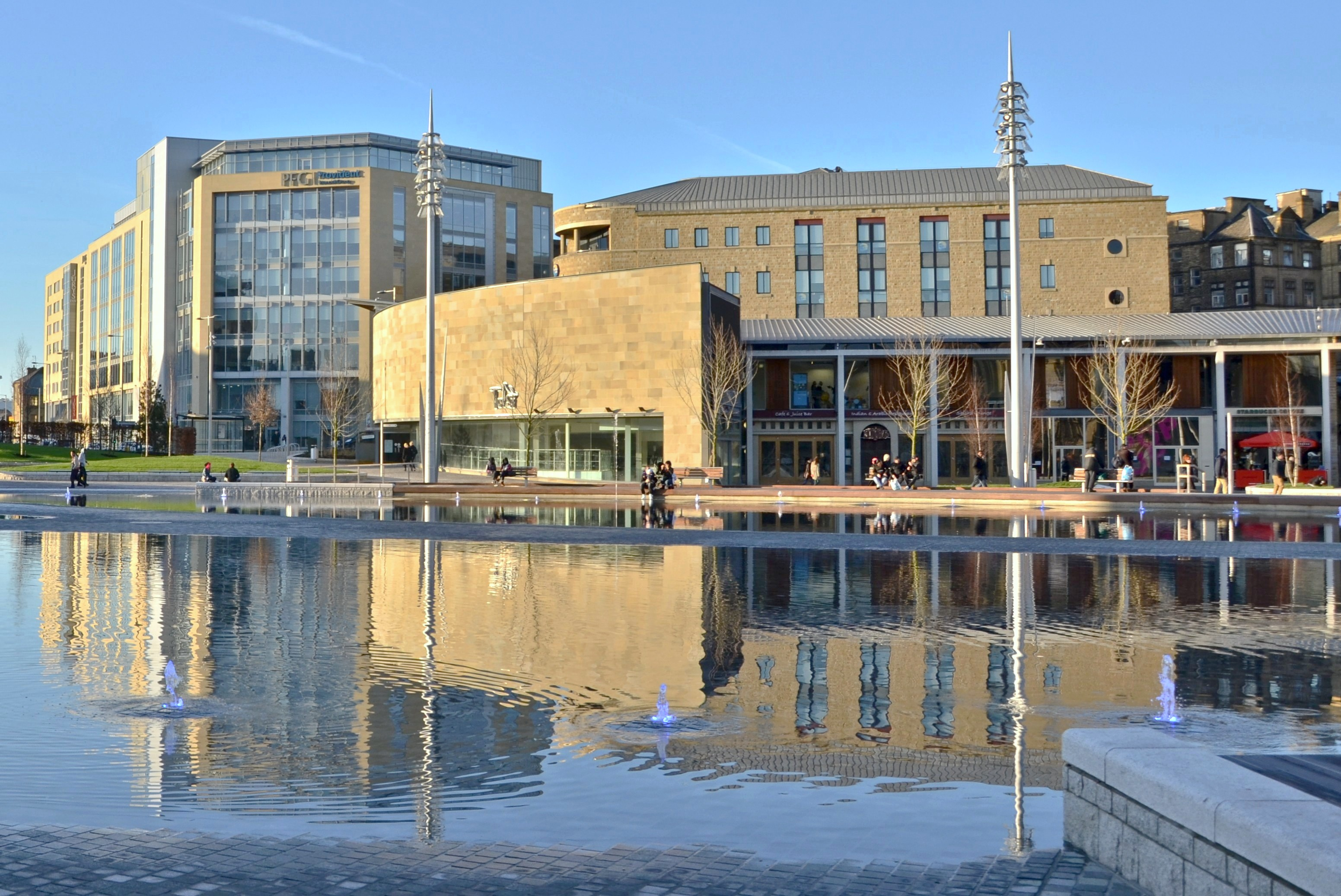
Centenary Square, Bradford

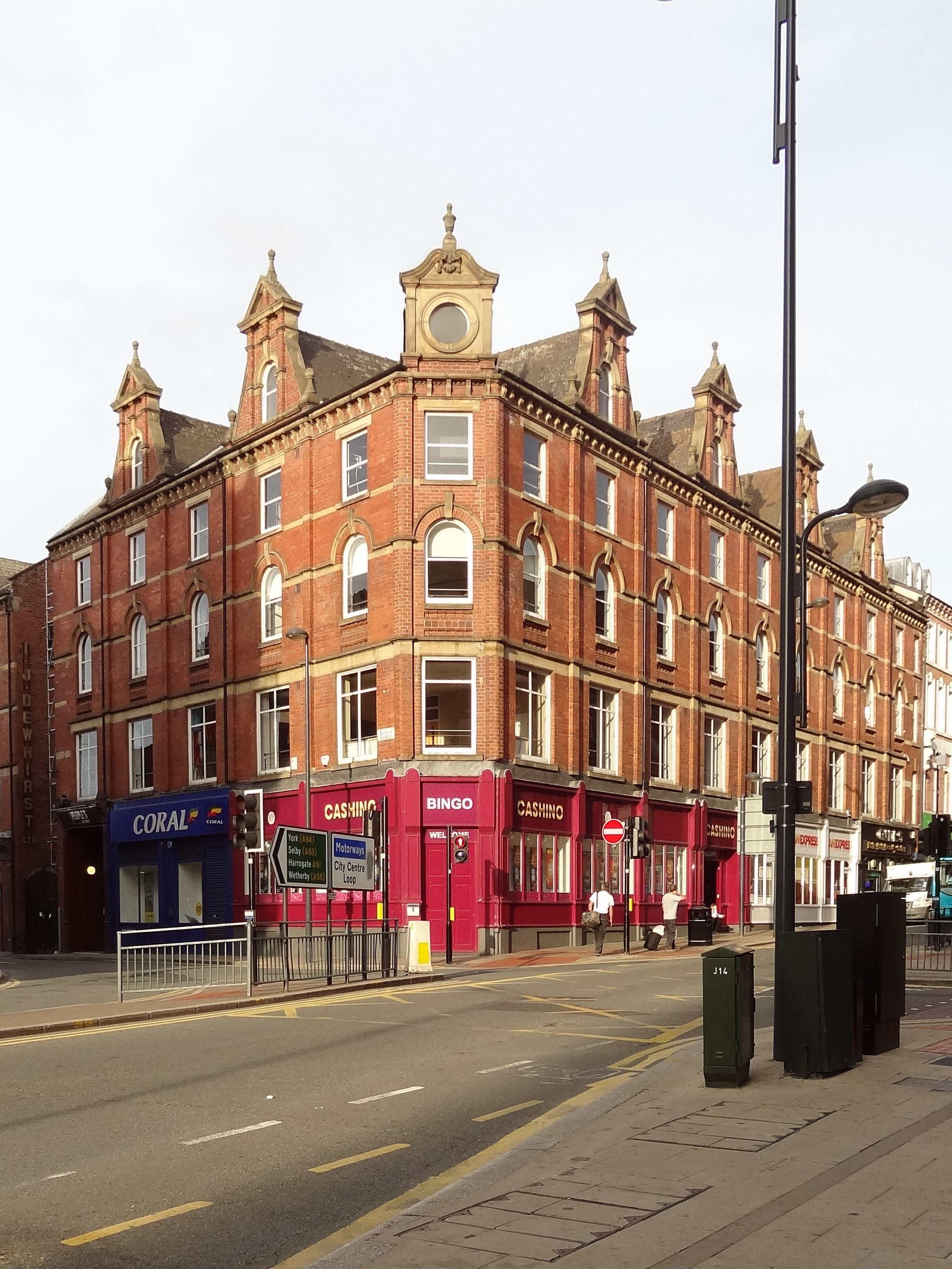
New York House, Leeds

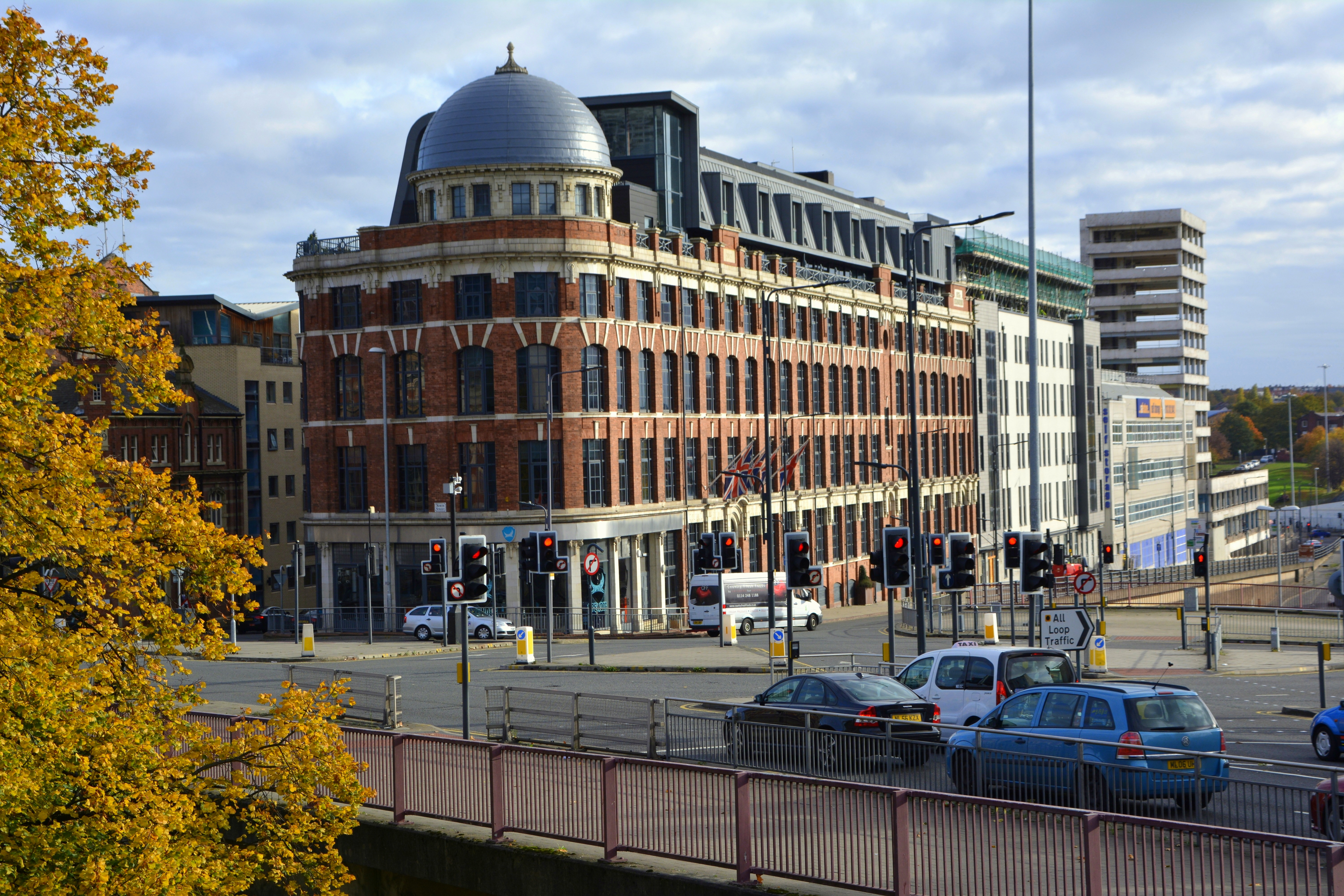
Crispin House, Leeds

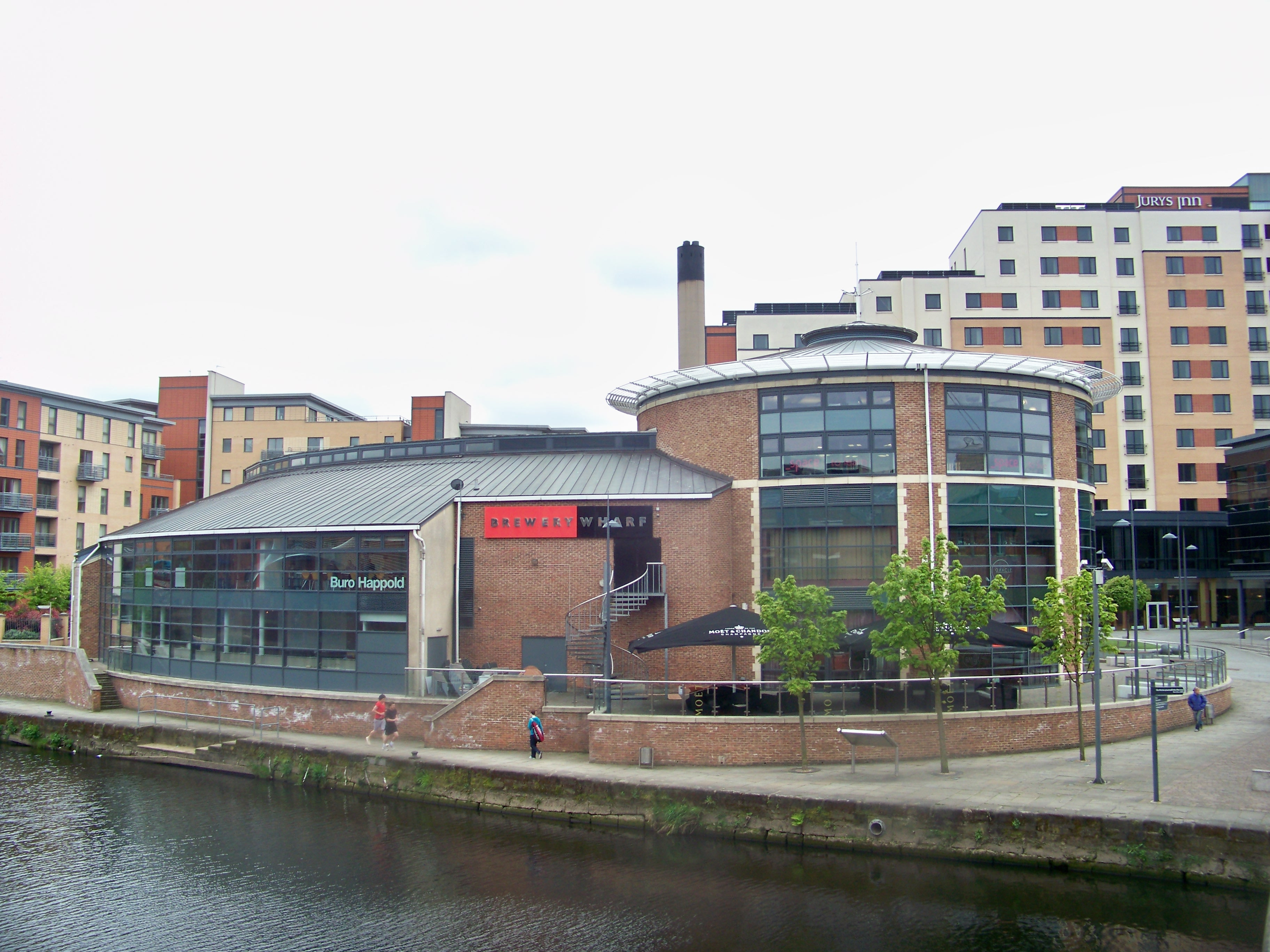
Brewery Wharf, Leeds

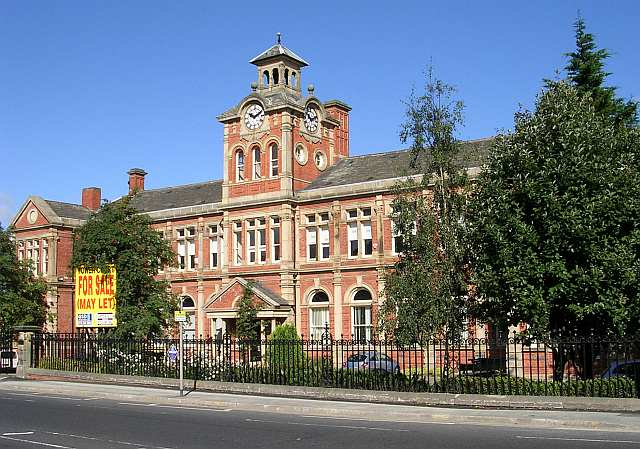
Tower Court, Leeds

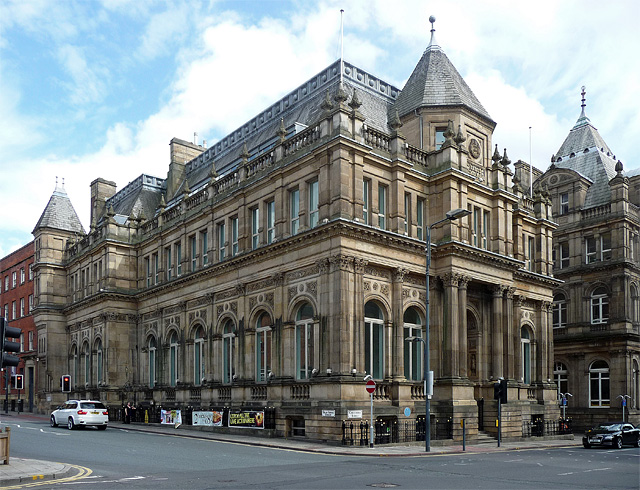
Leeds School Board

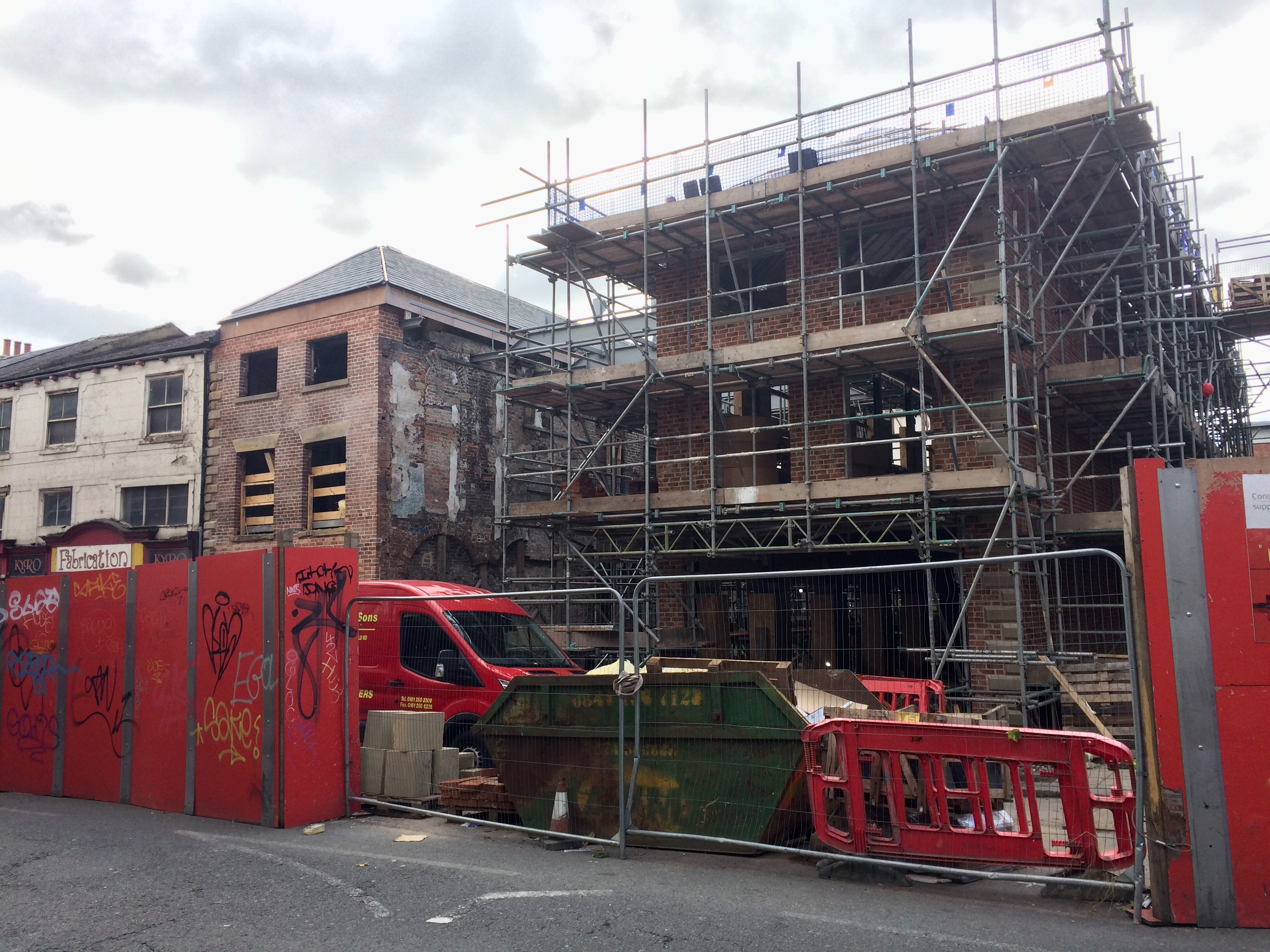
First White Cloth Hall, Leeds
