= Leeds Corn Exchange =

Grade I listed building in Leeds, England

Coordinates: 53.7959°N 1.5402°W

- Leeds Corn Exchange

General information
- Architectural style: Italianate style
- Location: Leeds, West Yorkshire, England
- Completed: 1864
- Renovated: 1990, 2008

Design and construction
- Architect: Cuthbert Brodrick

Listed Building – Grade I
- Official name: Corn Exchange
- Designated: 19 October 1951
- Reference no.: 1255771

The Leeds Corn Exchange is a shopping centre in Leeds, West Yorkshire, England. The building was opened as a corn exchange in 1864. It was granted grade I listed building status in 1951.

== History ==
The first corn exchange in Leeds was located at the north end of Briggate and was opened in 1829. By the mid-19th century, it was considered too small, and civic officials decided to commission a larger building.

The new building was designed by Cuthbert Brodrick, a Hull architect best known for Leeds Town Hall, in the Italianate style, built in stone with diamond-shaped rustification and was completed in 1863. The oval-shaped building featured two semi-circular porches with doorways which were flanked by Tuscan order columns supporting cornices, and was fenestrated by recessed round headed windows on both floors. The design of the dome was based on that of the Halle aux blés in Paris by François-Joseph Bélanger and François Brunet, completed in 1811. The architectural historian, Nikolaus Pevsner, praised the design which he regarded as "remarkably independent and functional".

The use of the building as a corn exchange declined significantly in the wake of the Great Depression of British Agriculture in the late 19th century. However, in the late 1980s Speciality Shops plc restored it and converted it into a retail facility. After a further restoration carried out by new owners, Zurich Financial Services, the Corn Exchange re-opened in November 2008 as a boutique shopping centre for independent retailers. The 13,200-square-foot (1,230 m^{2}) ground level was occupied by Piazza by Anthony until its sudden closure in June 2013.

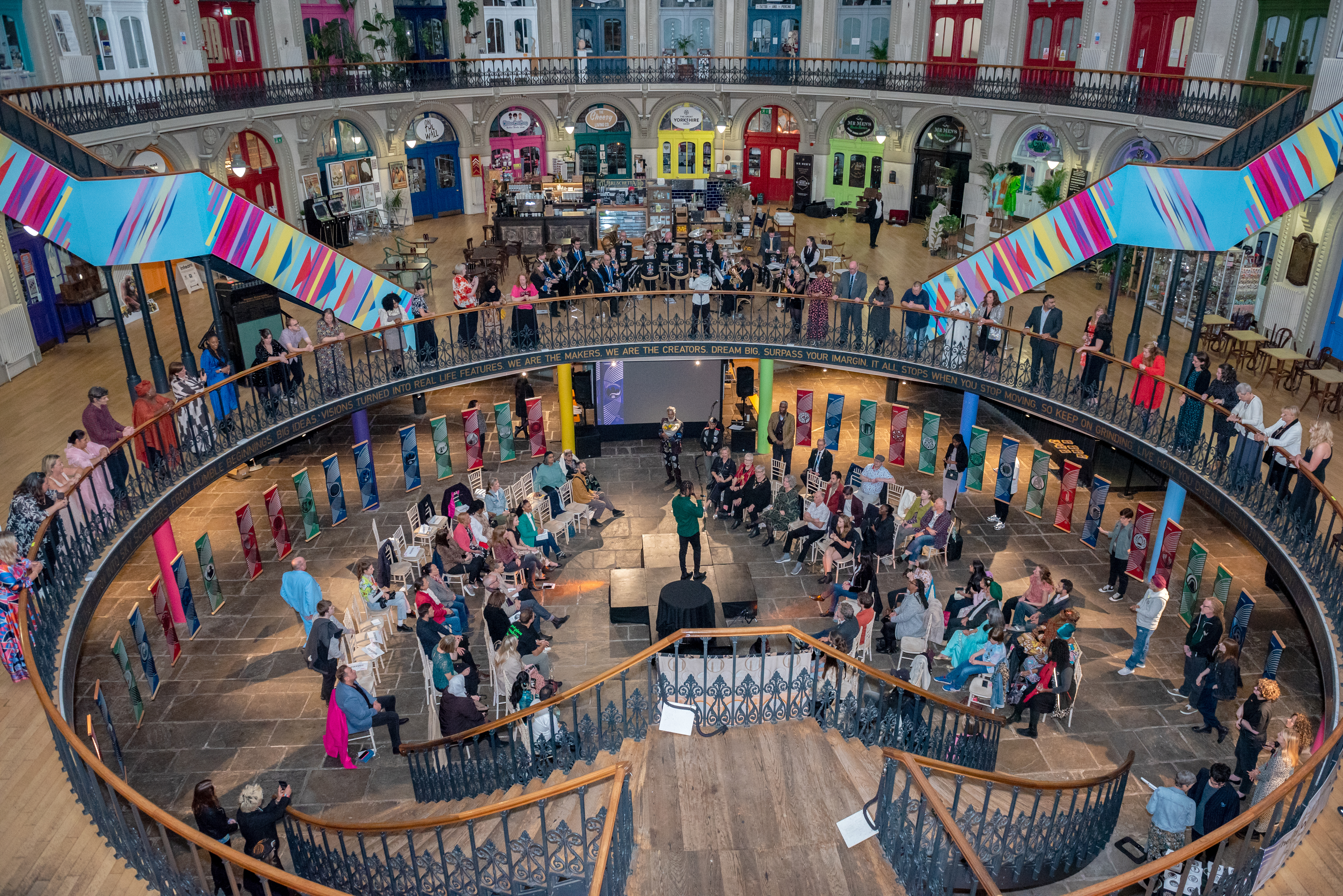
A City Without Seams launch in the Corn Exchange from above. LEEDS 2023

In 2017 the Corn Exchange was acquired by property company Rushbond. As of 2019, the Corn Exchange contains about 30 independent retailers and food outlets. It is described as "one of only three remaining Corn Exchanges still functioning as a centre for trade in Britain", albeit no longer functioning as a corn exchange. The Corn Exchange has also served as a venue for music events such as the South Asian Arts UK Summer Solstice Festival in June 2023.

Interior of the Corn Exchange

The building was depicted in an official BBC trailer for the 2021 Rugby League World Cup (in reference to Leeds being one of the host cities).

== See also ==
- Architecture of Leeds
- Corn exchanges in England
- Grade I listed buildings in West Yorkshire
- Listed buildings in Leeds (City and Hunslet Ward - northern area)
