= Majestic, Leeds =

Building in Leeds, West Yorkshire, England

The Majestic
- The Majestic in 2026 after redevelopment
- Former names: Top Rank Bingo Hall; Majestyk

General information
- Type: Cinema and restaurant
- Architectural style: Beaux-Arts
- Location: City Square, Leeds, England
- Coordinates: 53°47′47″N 01°32′56″W
- Current tenants: Channel 4 Knights plc
- Opened: 5 June 1922
- Renovated: 2017–20
- Closed: 10 July 1969
- Owner: Rushbond plc

Design and construction
- Architect: Pascal J Stienlet
- Designations

Listed Building – Grade II
- Designated: 14 June 1993
- Reference no.: 1375048

Renovating team
- Architect: DLA Architecture
- Renovating firm: Sir Robert McAlpine

Website
- majesticleeds.co.uk

The Majestic is a Grade II listed building on City Square, Leeds, occupying the corner of Quebec Street and Wellington Street.

Constructed as a cinema in the early 1920s during a boom in the building of picture palaces, it was closed in 1969, after which the Majestic was used as a bingo hall and later as a nightclub. The building was listed at Grade II in 1993 as the Top Rank Bingo Hall and, in 2014, was badly damaged in a fire, resulting in the loss of all original interior and roof. Subsequently, it has been redeveloped into offices by Rushbond, serving as the national headquarters of both Channel 4 and Caesars Entertainment.

== Architecture ==
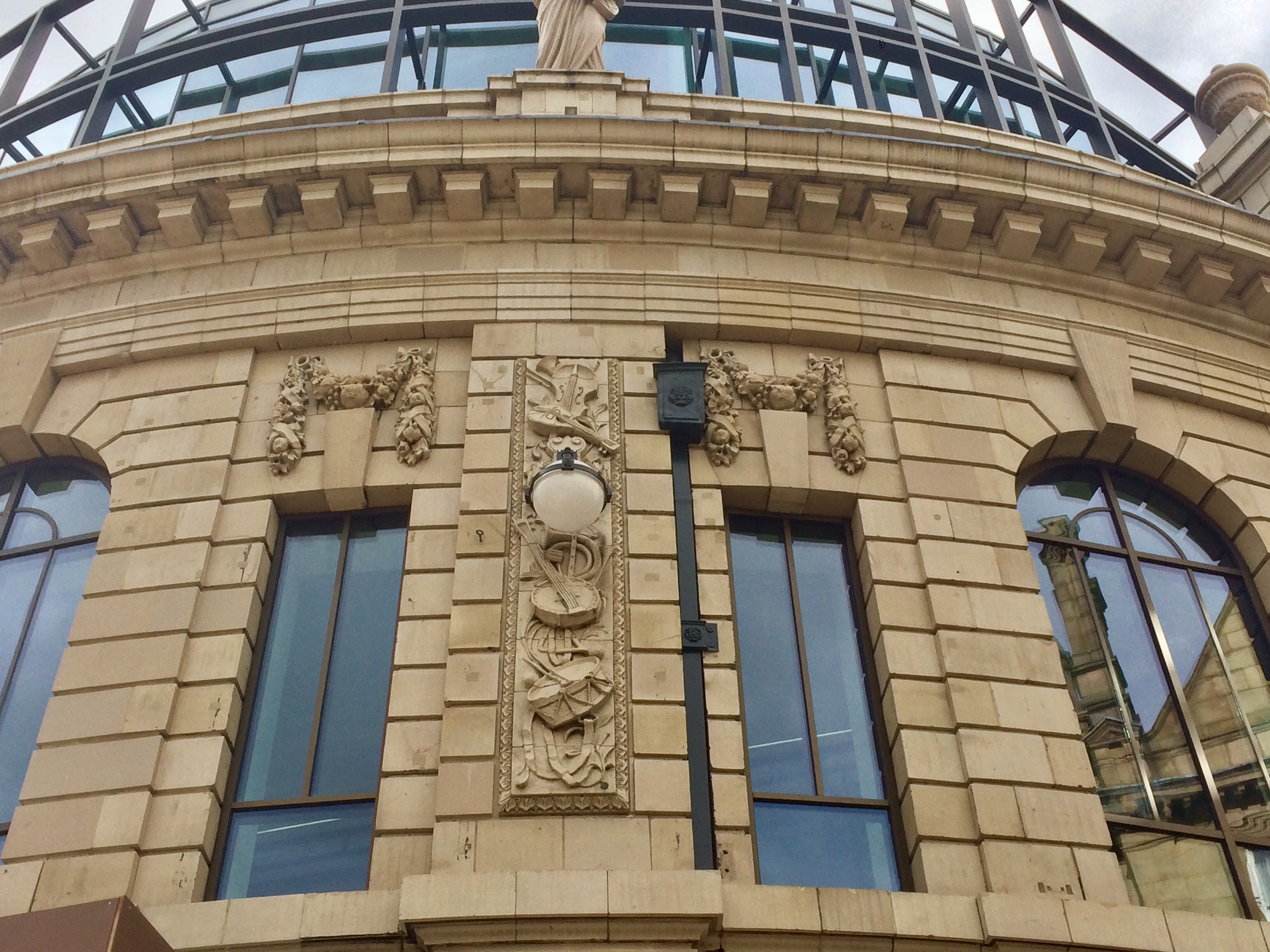
Moulded first floor detailing and cornice

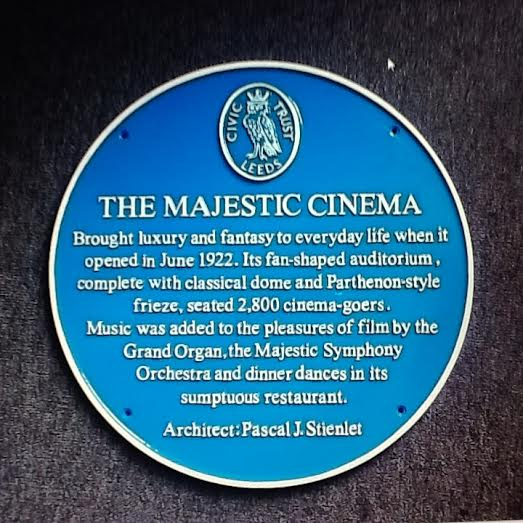
Blue plaque from Leeds Civic Trust

The Majestic is recorded in the National Heritage List for England as a Grade II listed building as a nationally important example of an early twentieth-century cinema, having been designated on 14 June 1993.

The Majestic is a two-storey building in the Beaux-Arts style clad in Marmo artificial marble, a glazed terracotta which was made by the Leeds Fireclay Co at Burmantofts. Until restoration, this white material was blackened for many years by the polluted environment of Leeds. It is sited on the corner of Wellington Street and Quebec Street, with a curved and decorative entrance facade facing City Square. It originally had steep slate mansard roofs with dormers and a 10 m (33 ft) dome, but these were lost to the fire of 2014. Though the style is reserved compared to previous Edwardian or Victorian buildings, there are many subtle external decorative features. These principally include the Greek key patterned panels on both side elevations, the cornice with modillions, vase balustrade and two sets of triple bull's-eye windows at the attic storey. On the first floor, there are moulded faience swags above windows and detailed panels illustrating musical instruments.

A further three glazed storeys were added to the building in its redevelopment by Rushbond, which follow a contemporary style, as well as a new lightwell topped by a glass dome to allow light into the offices, given its deep floor plan, and new openings on the ground floor in place of the former billboard panels.

=== Interior ===
The original interior of the Majestic was characterised by the fine decoration and embellishments of early 20th century cinemas and theatres. The generously sized, fan-shaped auditorium could seat 2,800 (1,600 in the stalls and 1,200 in the balcony), was covered by a coffered dome with a diameter of nearly 26 m (85 ft) and had many decorative features, such as a circular Classical frieze of repeated groups of horses and chariots, moulded cornices and wall motifs, and fluted Ionic columns surrounding the walls. Additionally, there was a grand organ of three manuals and 33 stops built by HS Vincent of Sunderland, and space for a small orchestra to perform live alongside the silent films which were shown during the 1920s when the Majestic opened.

The wedge shape of the Majestic's plot had a great influence on its interior layout; it provided an opportunity for a large curved auditorium, fanning as the building widens, facing a screen at the east of the building. Historically, the primary entrance to the cinema was therefore via the side entrances with a rear circulation space and crush hall being provided there.

The interior of the building was subject to repeated intervention during the 20th century, in association with its use for a bingo hall and nightclub. This included the insertion of dropped ceilings, staircases, partitioning, the cutting back of the balcony structure, and the painting of historic features in camouflage style paint.

=== Basement ===
The building's other rooms included a restaurant and a ballroom with a sprung dancefloor, both in the basement. These could be accessed directly from City Square using the main eastern entrance and were originally decorated in a Classical style. The rear of the basement included a circular kitchen and other servicing spaces.

== History ==
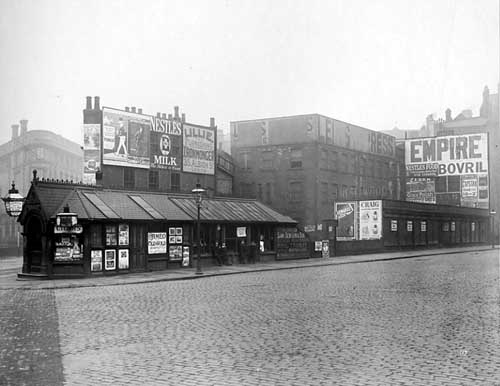
Quebec Street's junction with Wellington Street c.1900, showing the buildings which would eventually be replaced by the Majestic.

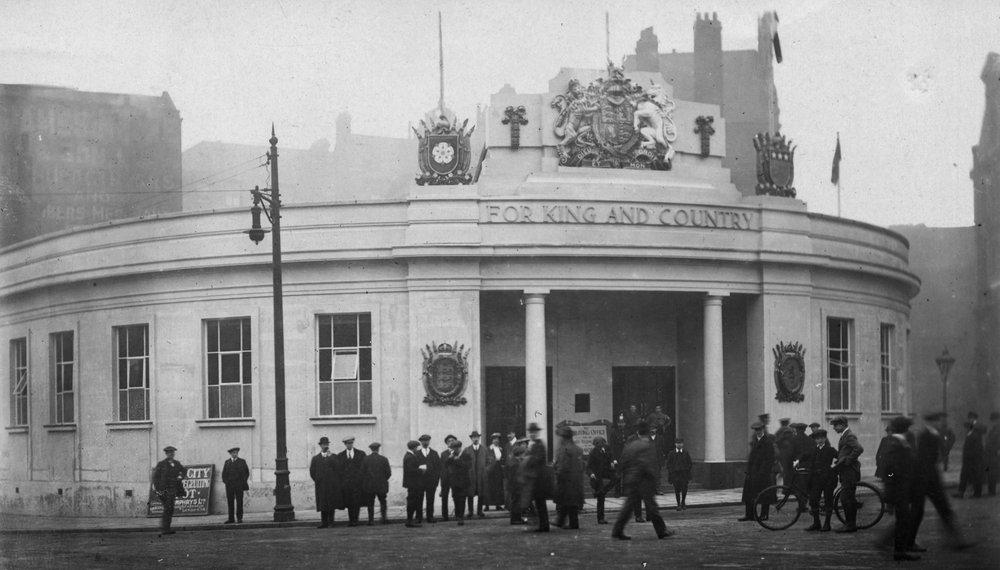
The Leeds Recruiting Office during the First World War, demolished in 1918

=== Majestic Cinema ===
The site of the Majestic was occupied at the end of the 19th century by a timber yard and a row of small buildings named Eye Bright Place; the western end survives as 34–38 Wellington Street. At the construction of City Square in 1896–1903, the corner site was cleared and left as an open space. It was the location of a recruitment office during the First World War, which was demolished at its conclusion in 1918.

Leeds Picture Playhouses Ltd bought the land, occupying a prime position beside Leeds railway station, from Leeds City Council for £80,000 (equivalent to £3,478,000 in 2025) and made plans for a cinema, which were described in a Yorkshire Evening News article on 16 January 1920; it claimed "the decorations and appointments will be of a most sumptuous character". Its architect was Pascal J Stienlet of Newcastle upon Tyne, with his partner Joseph C Maxwell. Stienlet was an established cinema architect who continued to practise until the 1930s. The chosen Beaux-Arts style was characteristic of many of the large and grand "supercinemas" or picture palaces of the time, which is considered a golden age of cinema building.

The Majestic Cinema was opened on 5 June 1922 by the Lord Mayor William Hodgson, the first film being Way Down East which was attended by 50,000 people in its first week. In December 1925, it was taken over by Provincial Cinematograph Theatres, who in turn were bought by Gaumont-British in February 1929, and after that by The Rank Organisation in 1941. During the Second World War, the building was used as a base for soldiers evacuated from Dunkirk and as an air raid shelter. The Sound of Music, which ran at the Majestic from April 1965 to September 1967, was the longest movie run ever in Leeds, though South Pacific had a 38-week run from September 1958.

From 1961 afternoon bingo started in the basement ballroom, becoming a full-time bingo hall in 1967. The cinema closed on 10 July 1969, with the final screening being The Good, the Bad and the Ugly.

=== After closure ===
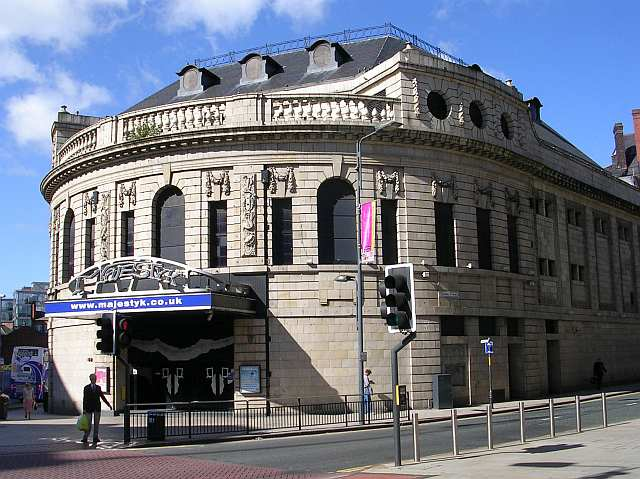
Under Majestyk branding in 2007

Immediately following closure of the cinema, it was converted into a bingo hall named Top Rank by its owner, The Rank Organisation, to go with the one in the basement ballroom. The bingo functions closed in 1996 and the building was sold to Luminar Leisure, becoming the Majestyk nightclub in 1997. This in turn closed in 2006, but a smaller live venue named Jumpin' Jacks remained open downstairs and the upper room continued to be used as a concert venue until 2008.

The whole building was granted consent for a change of use to casino with function room restaurant and sports betting area in 2005. However, the licence was refused by the local magistrates and a high court appeal was dismissed, therefore the casino use was never taken up. It was at this point, after a lengthy and ultimately fruitless legal process, that Luminar Leisure decided to sell the now empty building.

=== Fire and redevelopment ===
The new owner, the Leeds-based property firm Rushbond, began work with the contractor Sir Robert McAlpine from 2012 to restore and convert it into mixed leisure and retail use, including punching large new windows into the ground floor in the former billboard spaces, which was largely complete and ready for opening. However, on 30 September 2014 a large fire gutted the building, both the roof and most of the interior being destroyed. The incident closed off much of the city centre for over twelve hours. The outer walls were considered to be safe and not in danger of collapse.

Arson was established as the cause of the fire by the investigation, with evidence showing a naked flame had been deliberately placed against the seats. A 32-year-old man was arrested in connection with his suspicious behaviour at the scene, but he was cleared of all charges after a three-day trial in March 2015.

Work began in 2018 to convert it into office space and extend upwards, followed by the announcement in April 2019 that Channel 4 was in advanced talks to site its new national headquarters – containing creative and digital departments, alongside new creative hubs in Glasgow and Bristol – in the Majestic; it was confirmed in December 2019 that Channel 4 would occupy the third, fourth and fifth floors, followed in July 2020 by confirmation of the law firm Knights plc taking the first and second floors. Knights completed their move in May 2021, while Channel 4 opened its office in the Majestic with 200 staff in September 2021. Since March 2023, Caesars Entertainment has occupied the ground and lower floors of the Majestic, establishing its UK headquarters there, with teams dedicated to sports betting and trading technology.

== See also ==
- Listed buildings in Leeds (City and Hunslet Ward - northern area)
