= City Square, Leeds =

Square in Leeds, West Yorkshire, England

Coordinates: 53.7964°N 1.5476°W

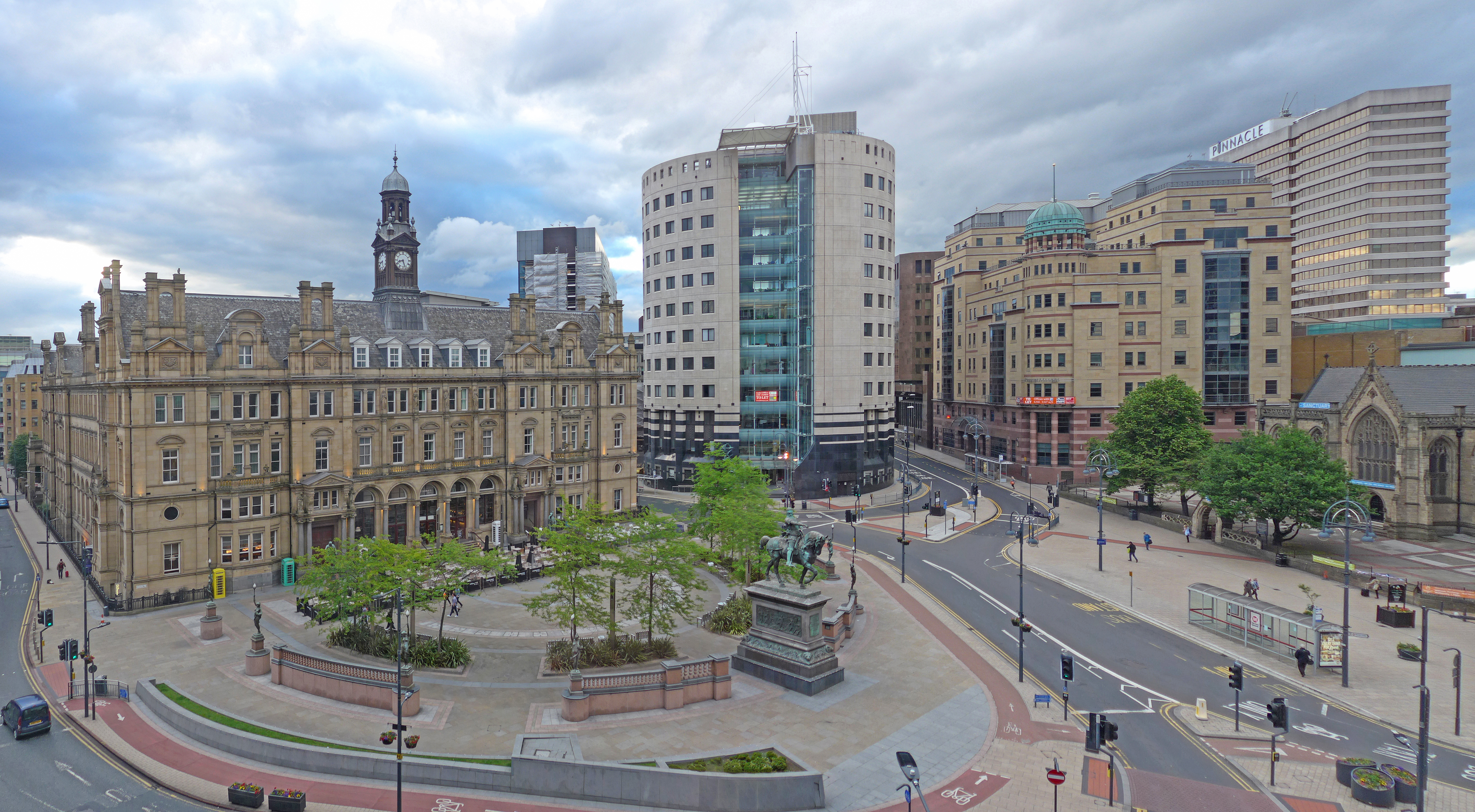
City Square and Park Row

City Square is a paved area north of Leeds railway station at the junction of Park Row to the east and Wellington Street to the south. It is a triangular area where six roads meet: Infirmary Street and Park Row to the north, Boar Lane and Bishopsgate Street to the south-east, and Quebec Street and Wellington Street to the south-west. The only building with a direct frontage is the former General Post Office, on the north-west side.

== History ==
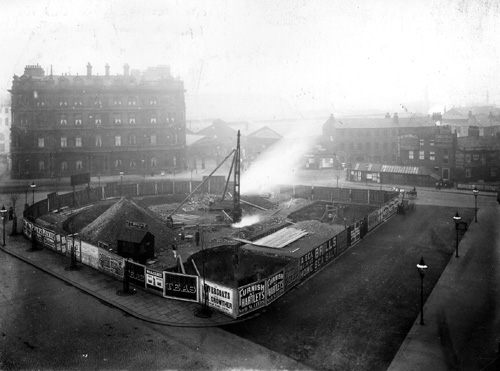
The original laying out of City Square in 1897. Behind is the original Queen's Hotel.

Proposals were made in 1893 to transform the area in front of the station. The demolition of Leeds' Coloured Cloth Hall and Quebec House gave an open space in which a new General Post Office was constructed in 1896 with a public space in front. One proposal was to name the development after John Smeaton, the famous local engineer, but the council unanimously opted to call it City Square, as Leeds was being made a city that year. The initial plan had tramway waiting rooms, and public lavatories welcoming new visitors to Leeds. However, Colonel Thomas Walter Harding (Lord Mayor of Leeds between 1898 and 1899) was so dismayed that he commissioned William Bakewell to design a square more in the style of an Italian piazza, with statues and trees.

In the Second World War, during an air raid on Leeds, the Luftwaffe bombed City Square. It was at the time the site of a public air raid shelter, which did not withstand the bombing and was significantly damaged.

In 1964, the view of the square changed dramatically when the Victorian-style Norwich Union building and the Royal Exchange building with its clock-tower were torn down to make way for new modern blocks.

City Square in 2026

In 1995, the 1967 modernist Norwich Union House was demolished to make room for the current No. 1 City Square inaugurated in 1998.

In 1997, traffic that went through the City Square, mainly buses and taxis, was diverted to the Leeds City Centre "Loop" traffic scheme. The City Square area was refurbished in 2003, which included closing off one side of the square to traffic, rearranging the statues and adding fountains and traditional street furniture to the square. The fountains were removed in 2013.

== Statuary ==
All are in bronze and larger than life. There is a large equestrian statue, four statues of famous men, and a ring of female nudes, or nymphs, acting as lampholders. The statues were part of a celebration of Leeds changing status from a town to a city. All are at least Grade II listed buildings.

=== Black Prince ===
The Black Prince

The large equestrian statue is of Edward, the Black Prince (1330–1376), and is a major work of Thomas Brock (1847–1922). Edward had no specific connection with Leeds, and the choice of subject therefore caused something of a stir. The statue is on a pedestal with relief panels depicting some of the prince's notable victories. It (along with most of the statues) was funded by Colonel Thomas Walter Harding. Brock took seven years to make it, and it had to be cast in Belgium because it was too big for any British foundry. It was carried by sea to Hull, then on a barge along the River Aire to Leeds. It was unveiled on 16 September 1903 to cheering crowds. It is Grade II* listed.

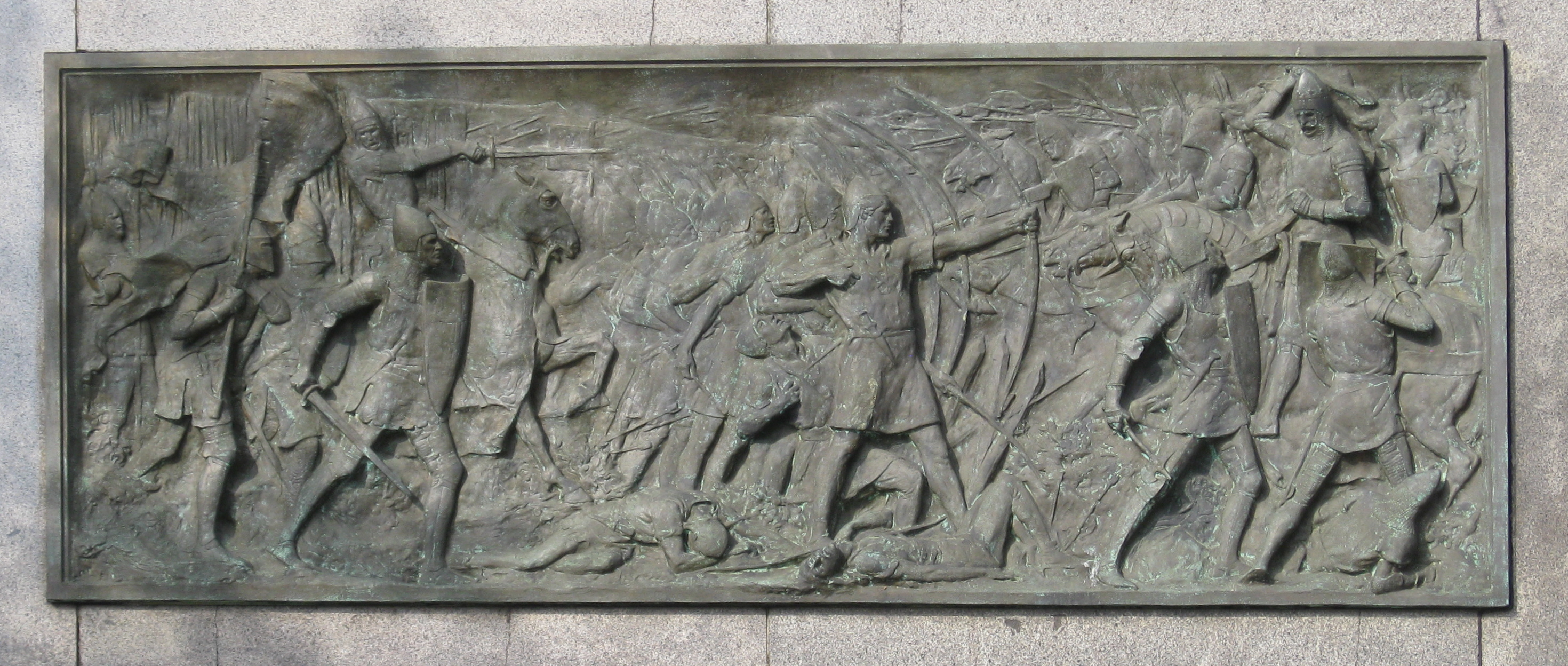
Panel on plinth of a land battle

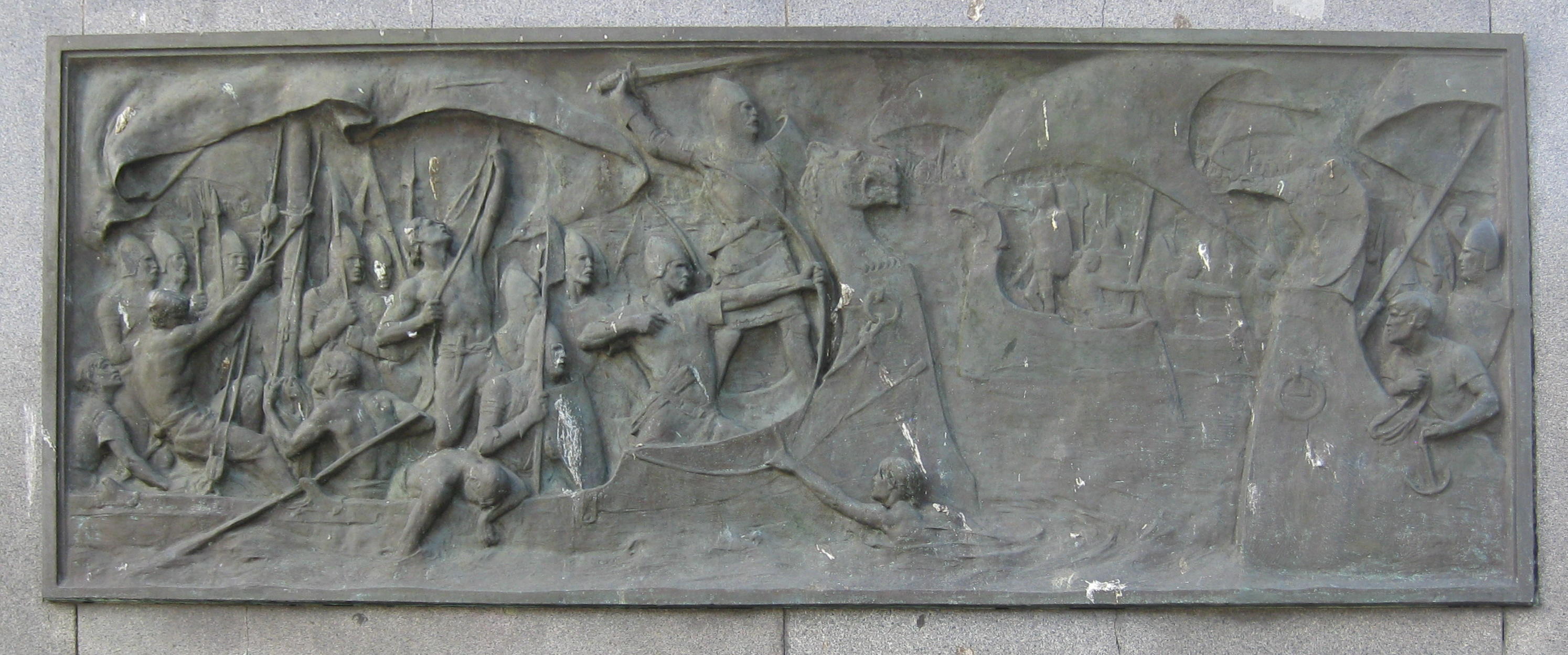
Panel on plinth of a sea battle

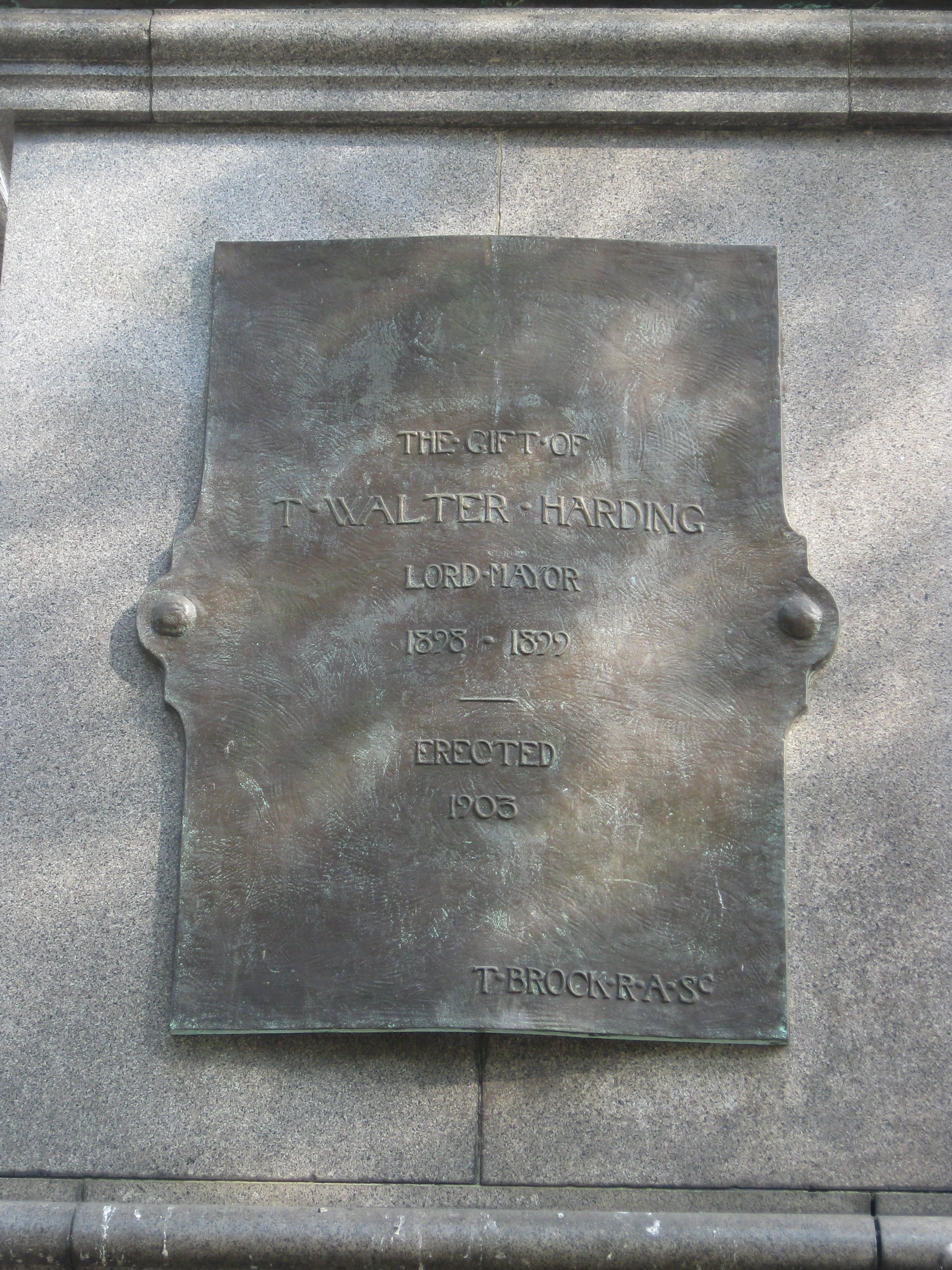
Plaque identifying the donor and sculptor

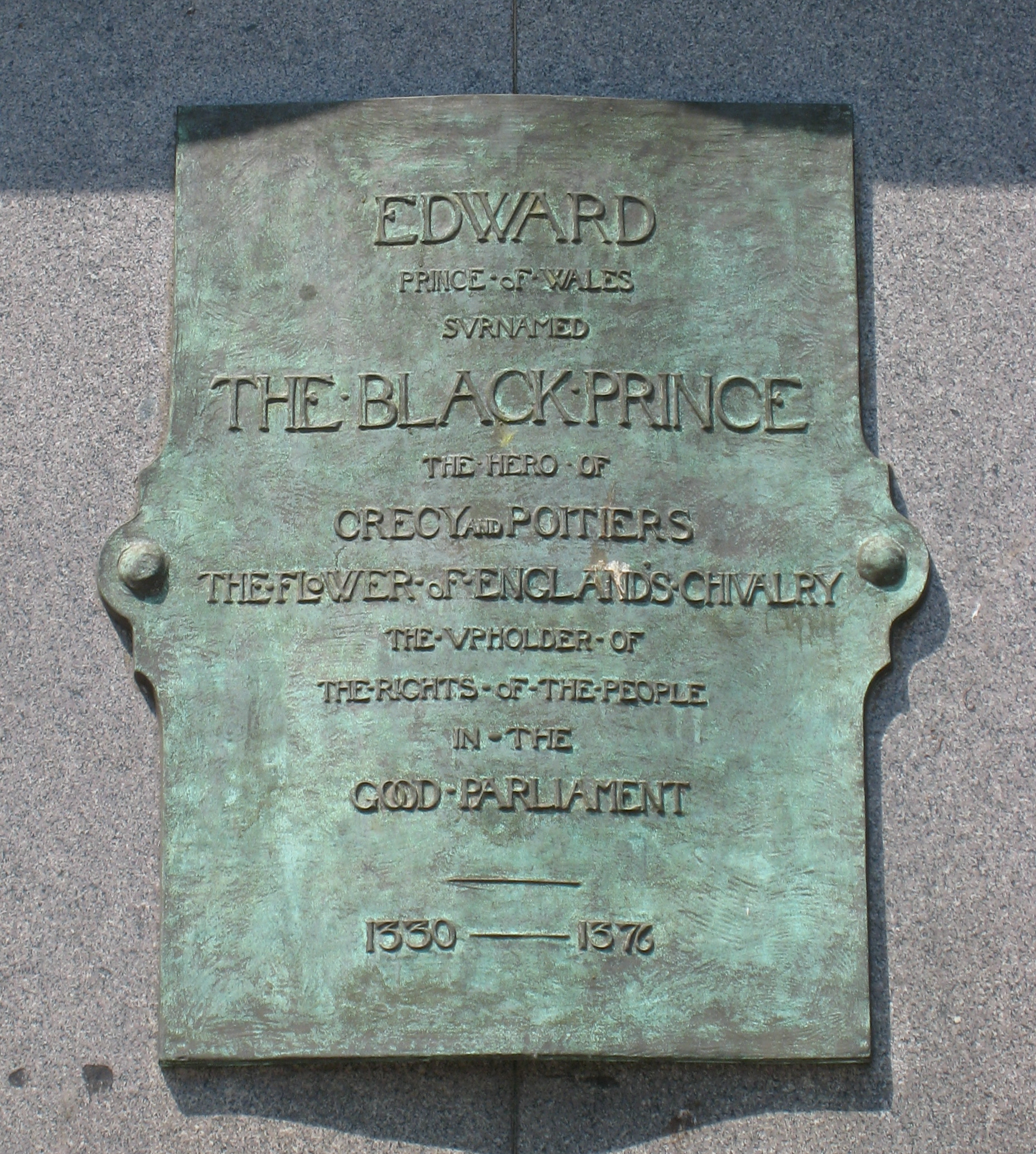
Plaque identifying the subject

=== James Watt ===
Though again James Watt had no specific connection to Leeds, he was a famous engineer and typified the technological change which had made Leeds into a city. This was erected in 1903. It is by Henry Charles Fehr and the gift of Richard Wainwright.

=== John Harrison ===
John Harrison (1579–1656) was a local cloth merchant and benefactor of Leeds, having built a church and a grammar school. This was erected in 1903. It is also by H. C. Fehr and the gift of Councillor Richard Boston.

=== Dr Hook ===
Dr Walter Hook (1798–1875) was a vicar of Leeds and a major influence on both religion and education in the city. He was responsible for rebuilding the parish church (now Leeds Minster) and thirty schools. This was erected in 1902. It is by F. W. Pomeroy and the gift of Colonel Thomas Walter Harding.

=== Joseph Priestley ===
The famous chemist and theologian Joseph Priestley lived in Leeds from 1767 to 1773, and was the minister at Mill Hill Chapel, which is on the square. He used carbon dioxide from the local brewery to continue his experiments on gases. This was erected in 1903. It is by Alfred Drury and the gift of Colonel Thomas Walter Harding.

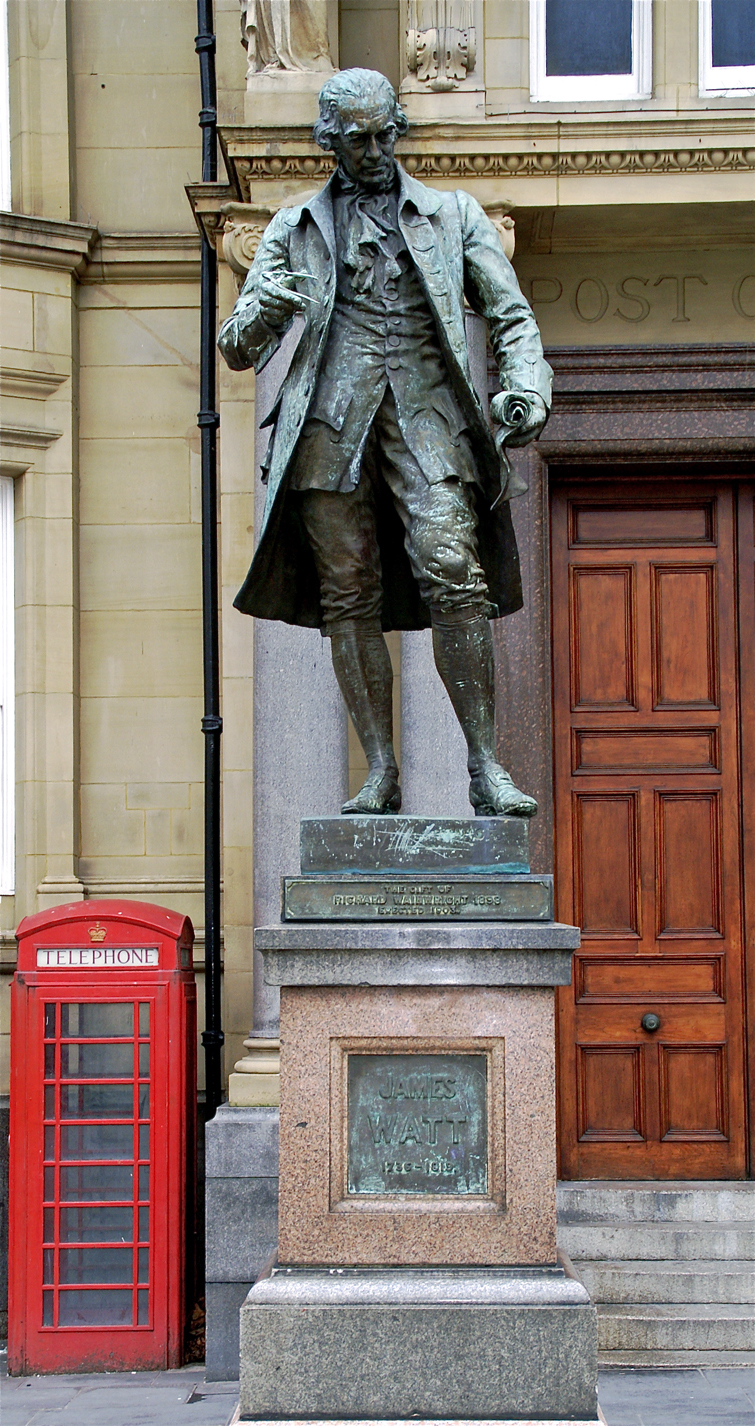
James Watt

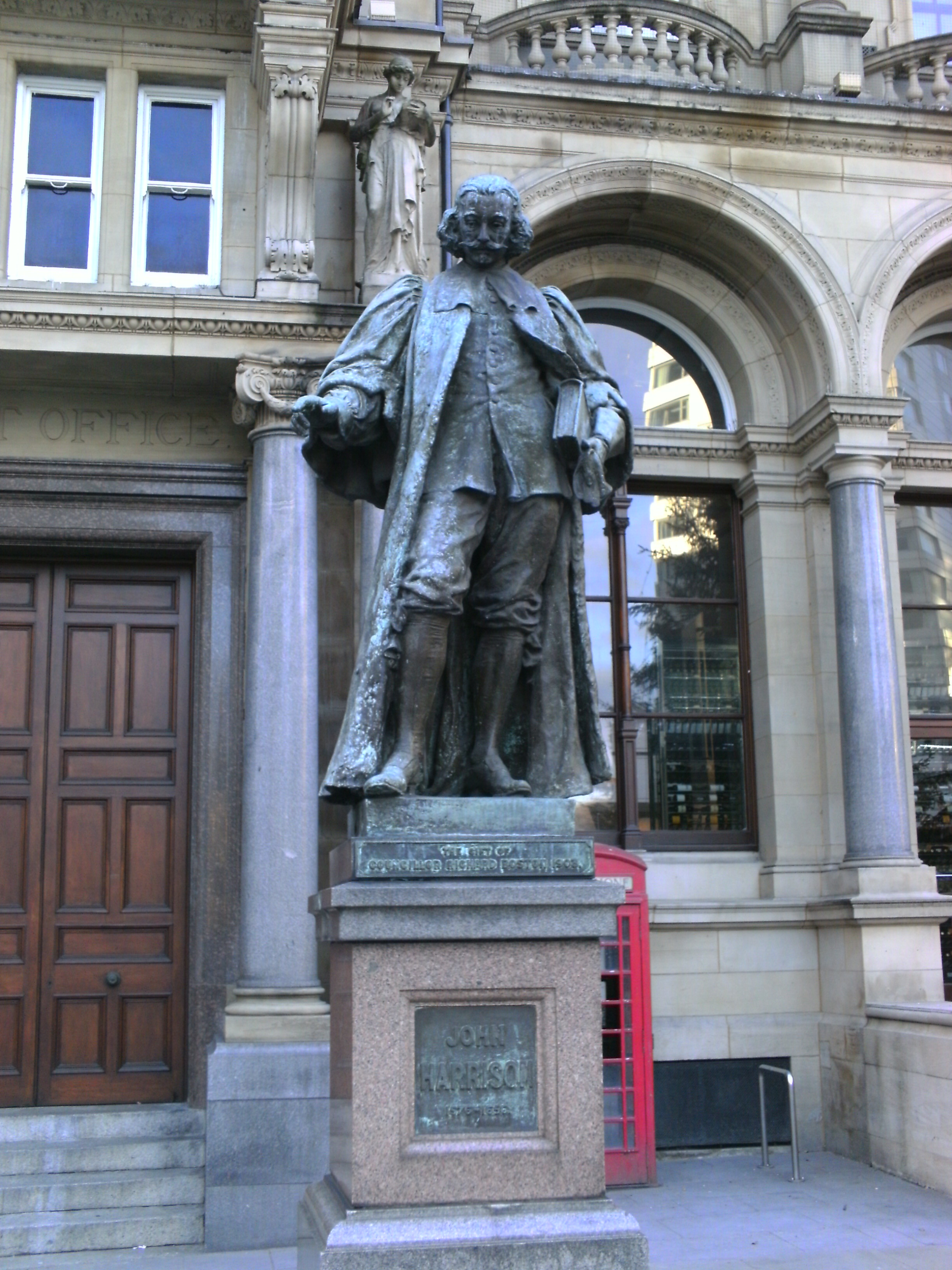
John Harrison

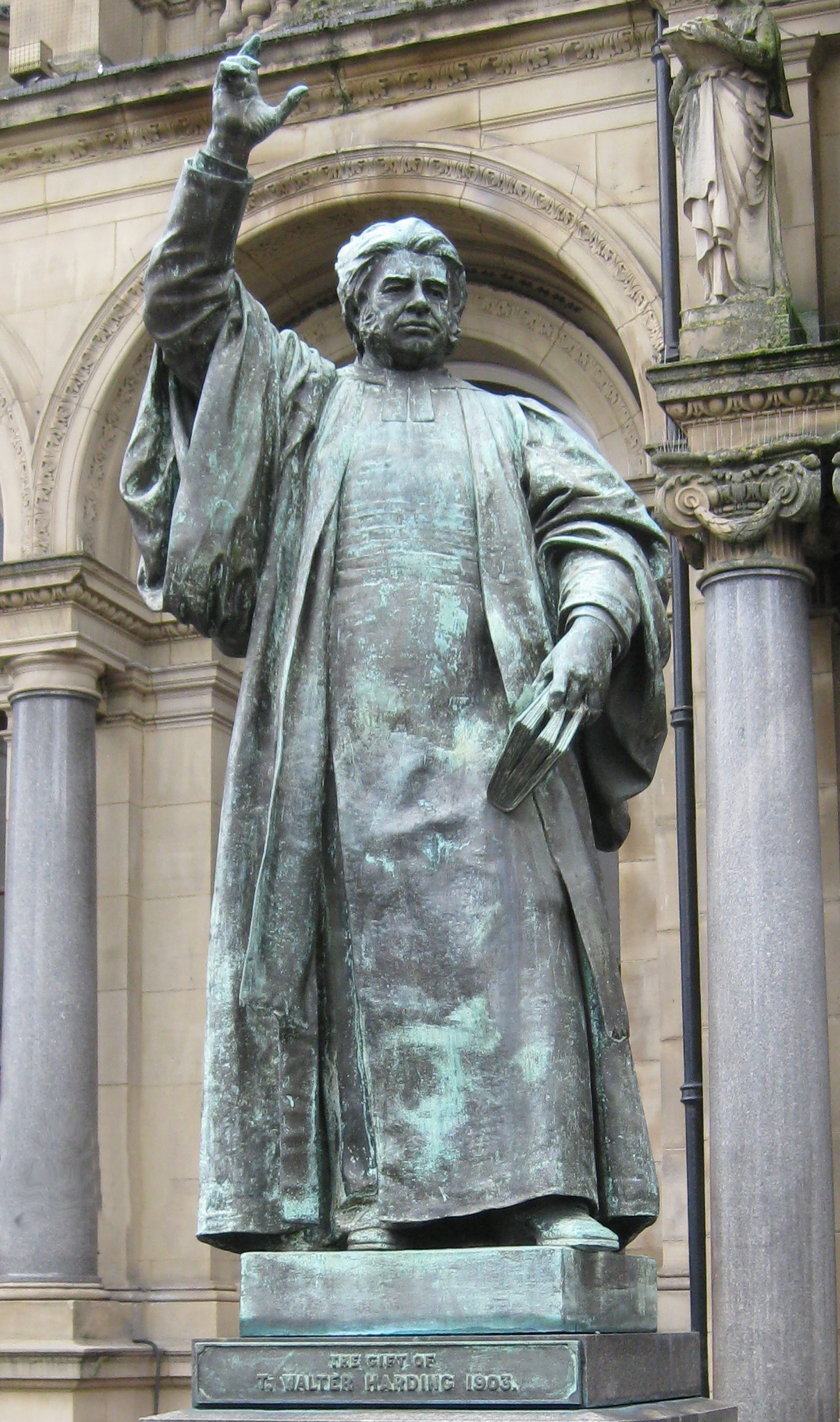
Dr Walter Hook

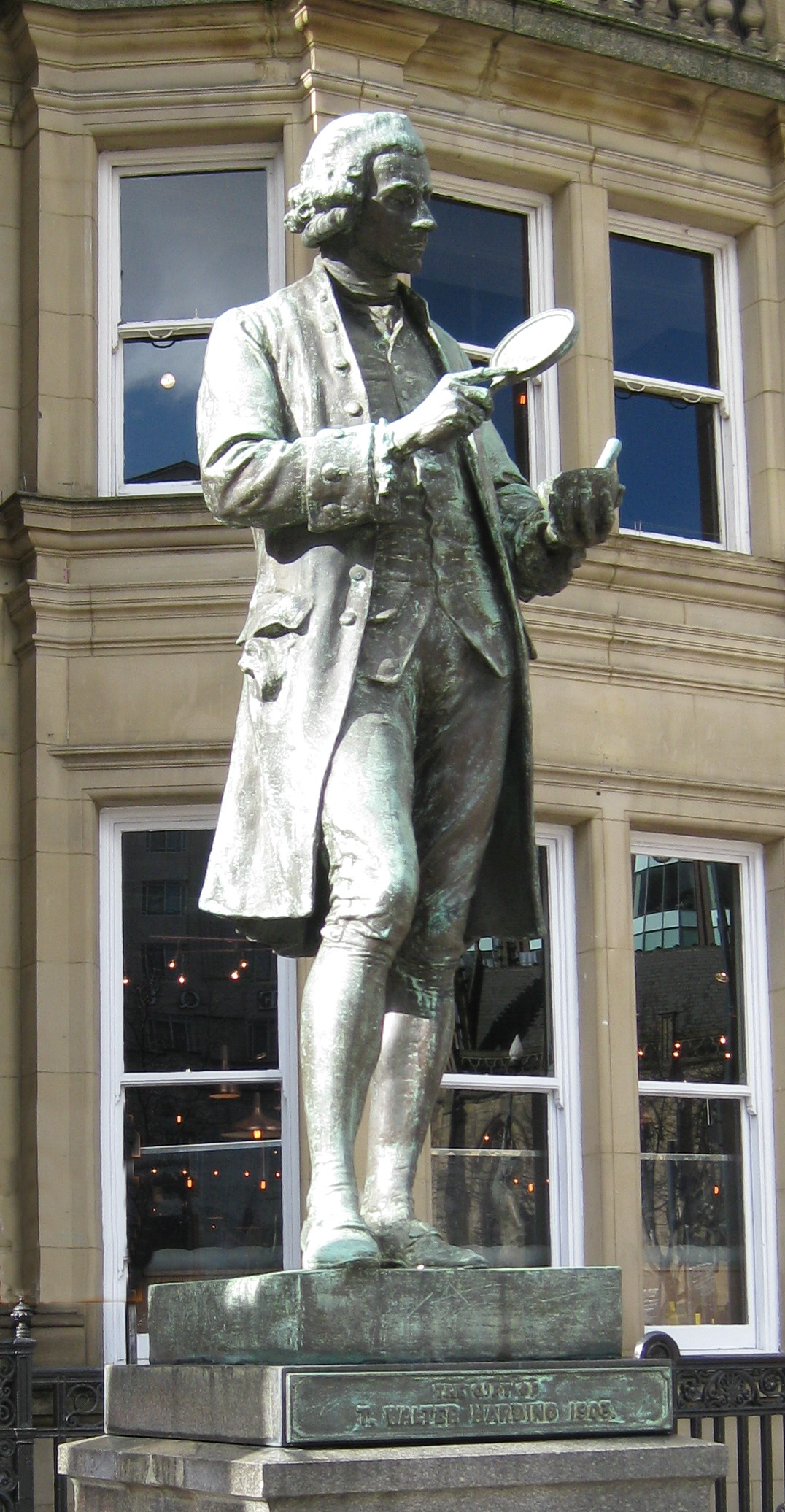
Joseph Priestley

James Watt and John Harrison

=== Eight Nymphs ===
The most controversial feature of the square was a ring of eight nude females holding lamps, which attracted critical letters to the Yorkshire Post when unveiled in 1899. They are by Alfred Drury, now celebrated as a pioneer of the New Sculpture. They are of two forms, one named as "Morn" holding a lamp in her right hand and clutching some flowers, and the other named as "Even" holding a lamp in her left hand, with her other hand to her head.

They were originally arranged on the points of the compass in a circle around the Black Prince. In 1956 they were removed from this arrangement and put in two rows of four. In the 1990s, it was planned to remove them altogether, as Victorian public art was considered by many to be worthless. However, this was resisted and they were placed in their present positions of a three-quarter circle.

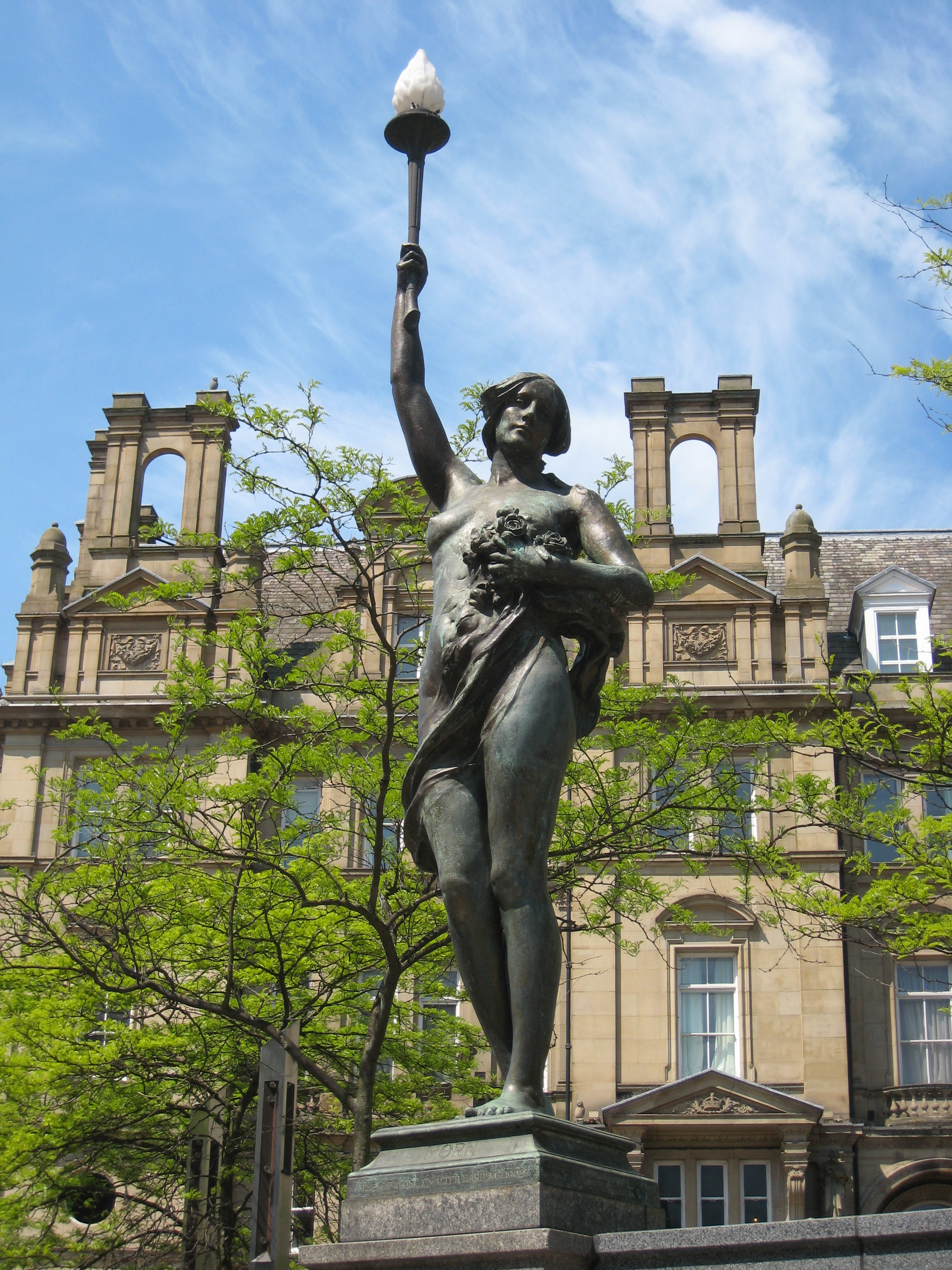
"Morn"

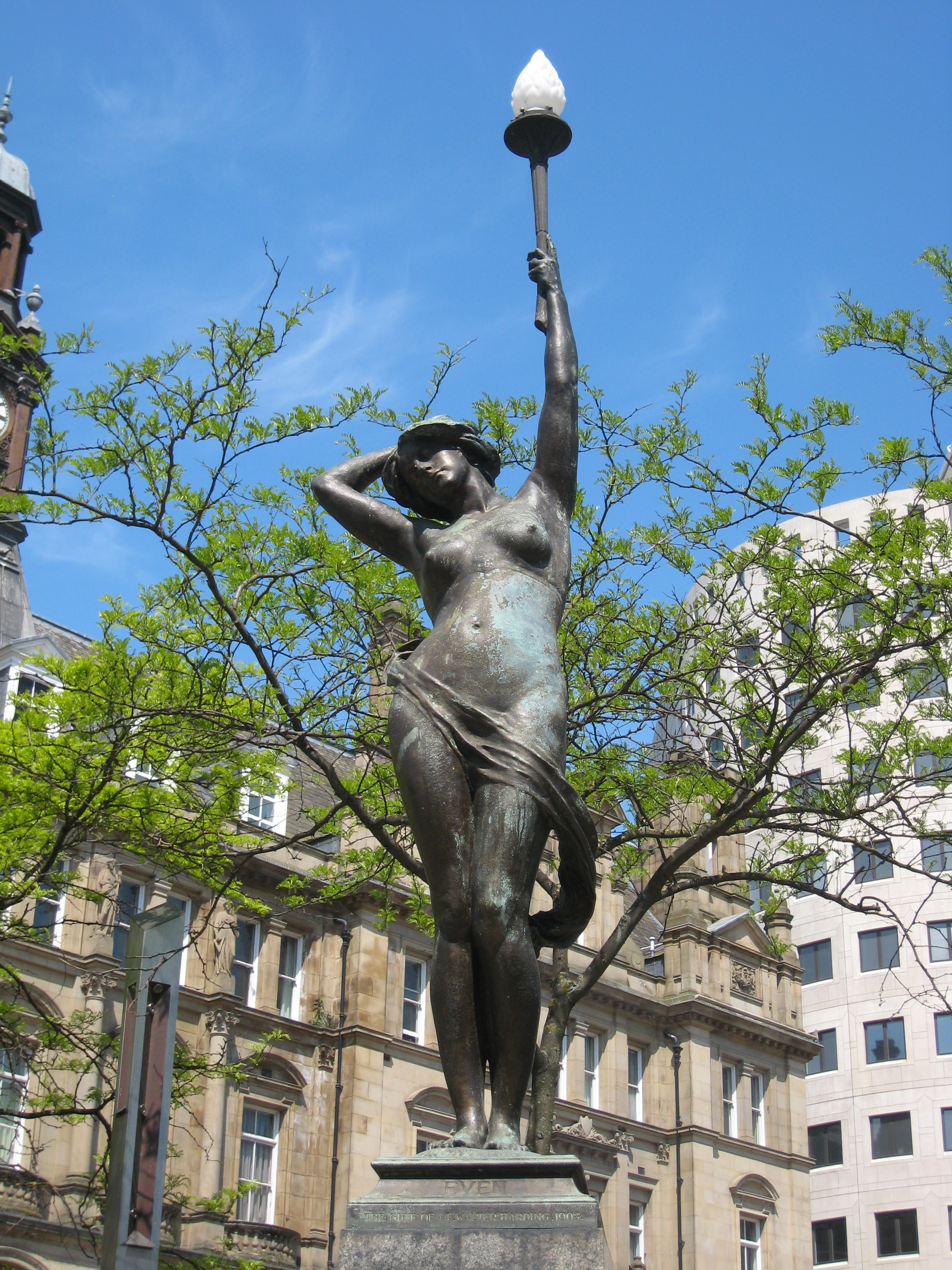
"Even"

== Buildings ==
=== General Post Office ===
The former General Post Office

The former Leeds General Post Office covers the northwest side of the square. It is a Grade II listed building, in classical style by architect Sir Henry Tanner. It is in Ashlar, with slate and lead roofs of four stories and two main entrances with columns on the square, with a central clock tower. There are other entrances to the sides on Quebec Street and Infirmary Street. The telephone booths outside the former post office are K6 design and also Grade II listed buildings.

It opened 18 May 1896. Two figures by William Silver Frith representing "Reading" and "Writing" are over one entrance, while "Reading" and "Philosophy" are over the other. Four figures above have been said to represent Time, Air, Light and Earth. Along with other smaller decorations are two owls on the front.

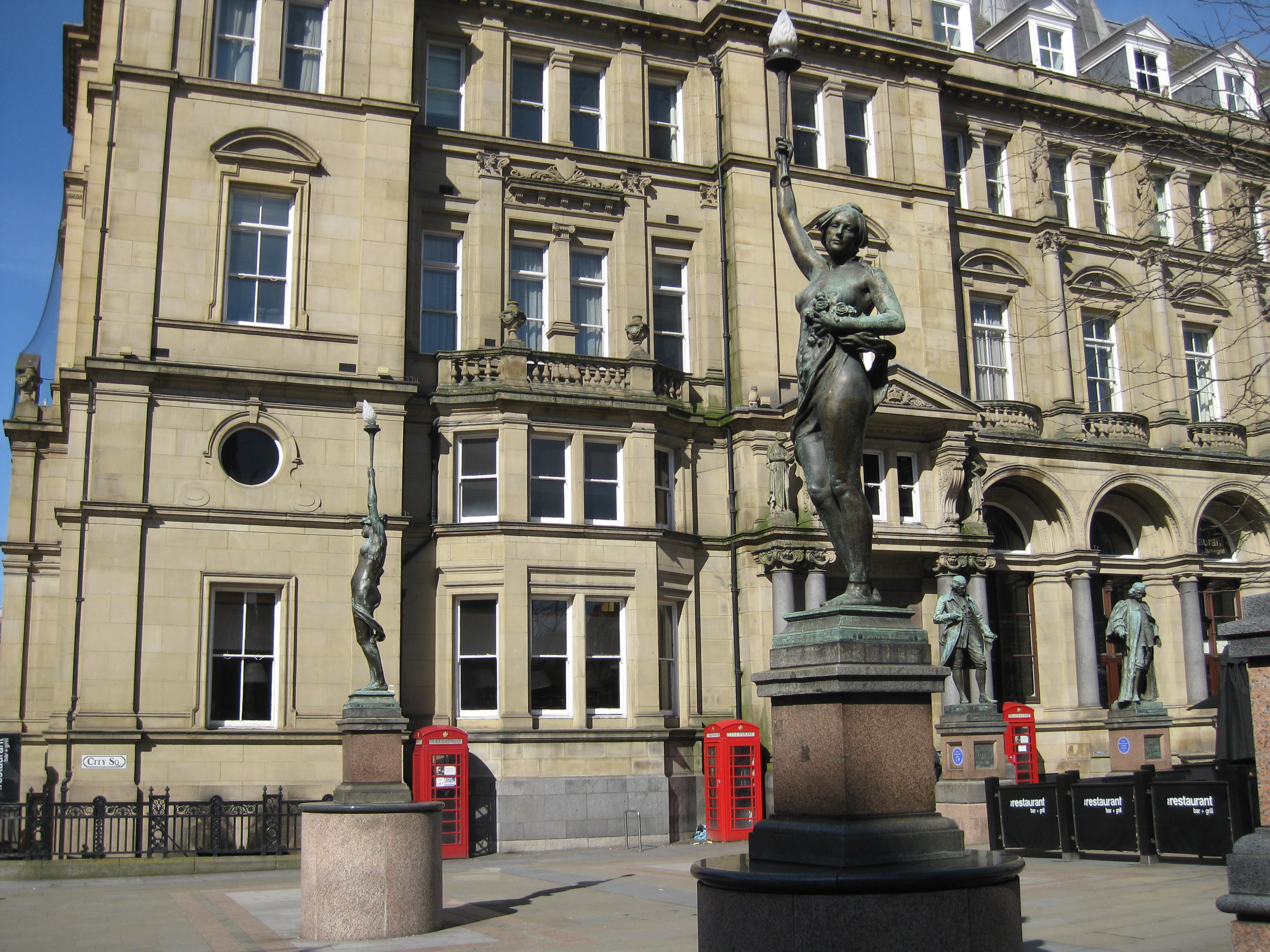
Close-up of the old Post Office. The building, the statues and the telephone booths are all Grade II listed buildings

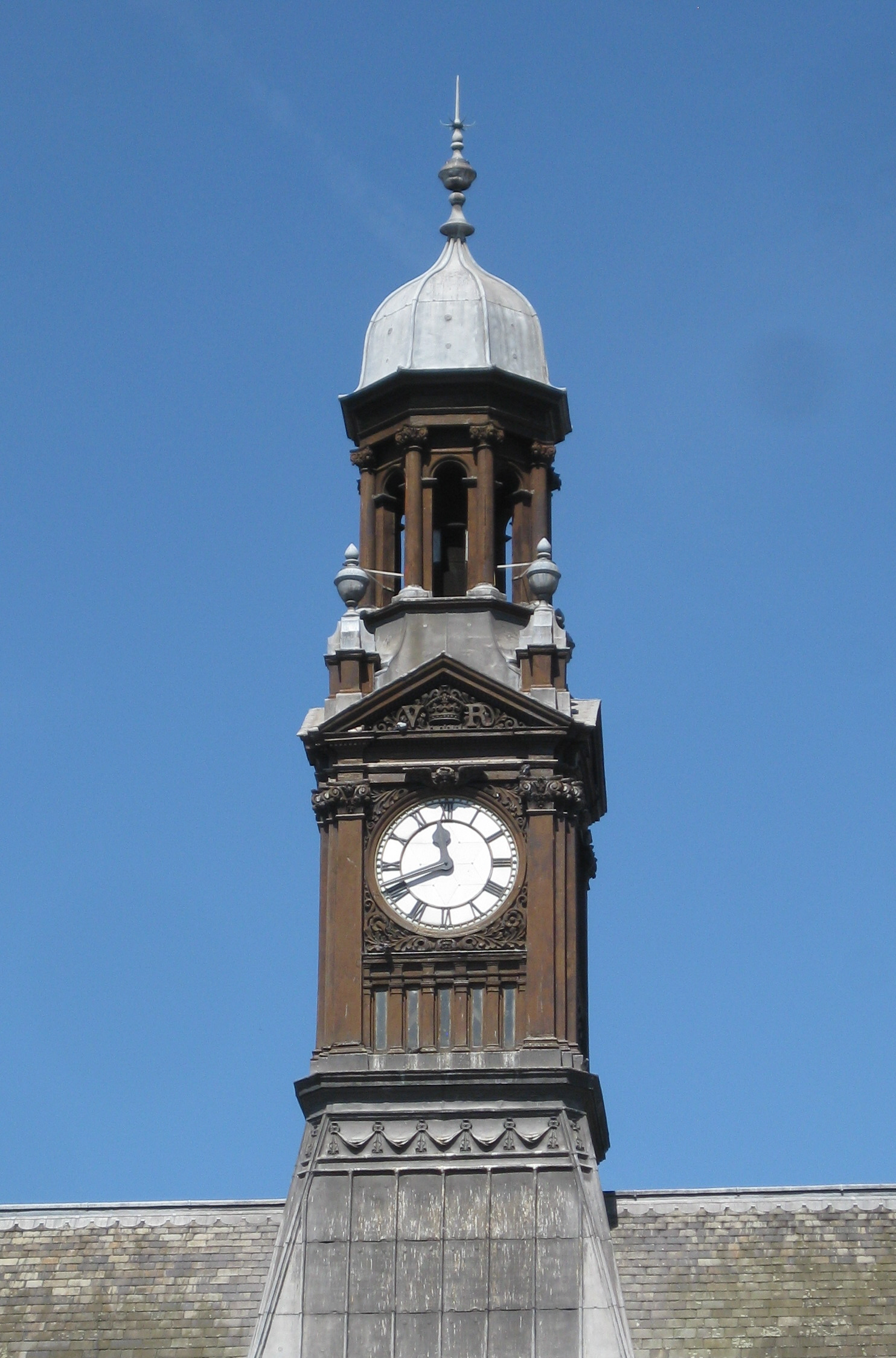
Clock tower

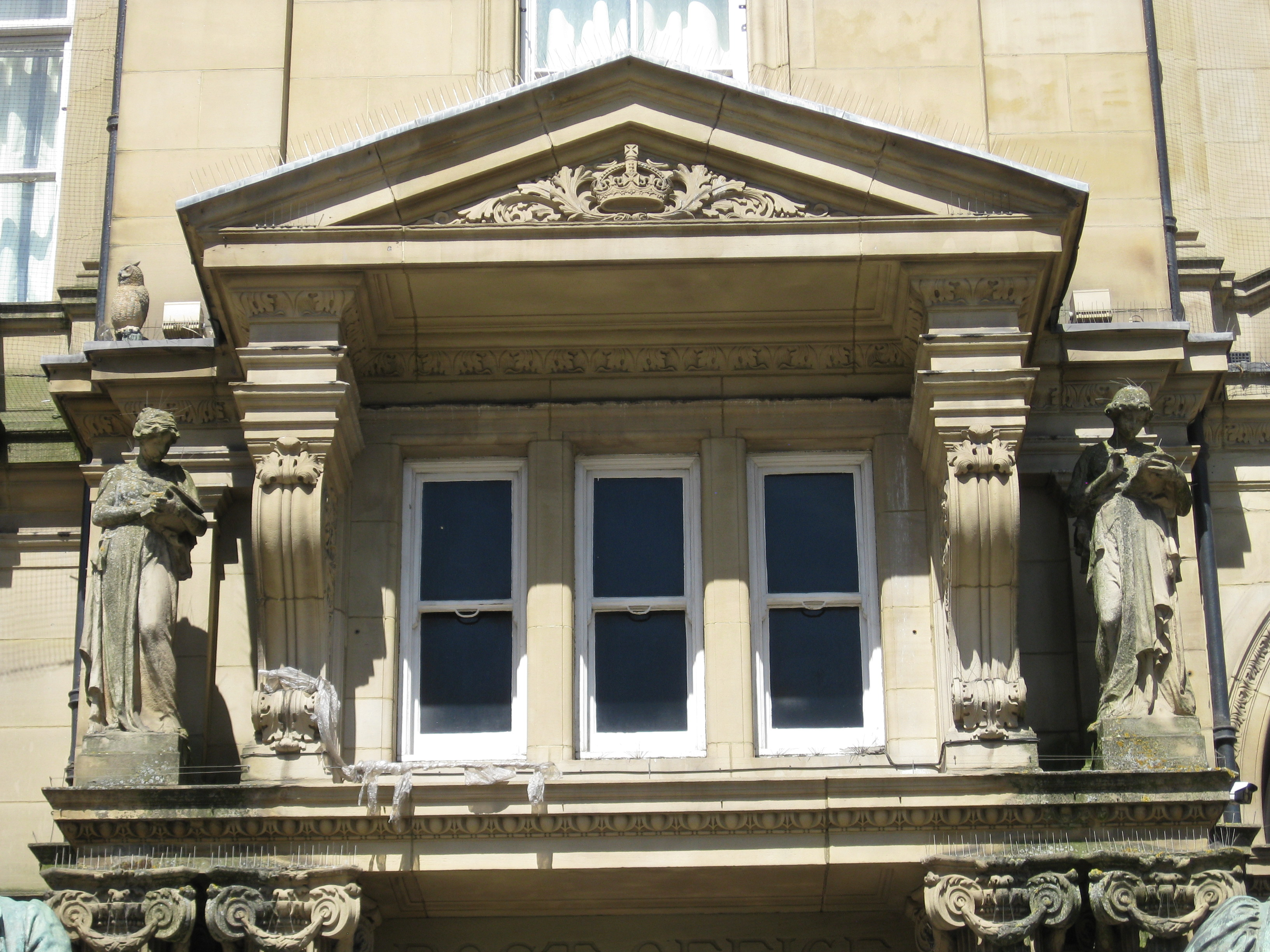
Reading and Writing and an owl

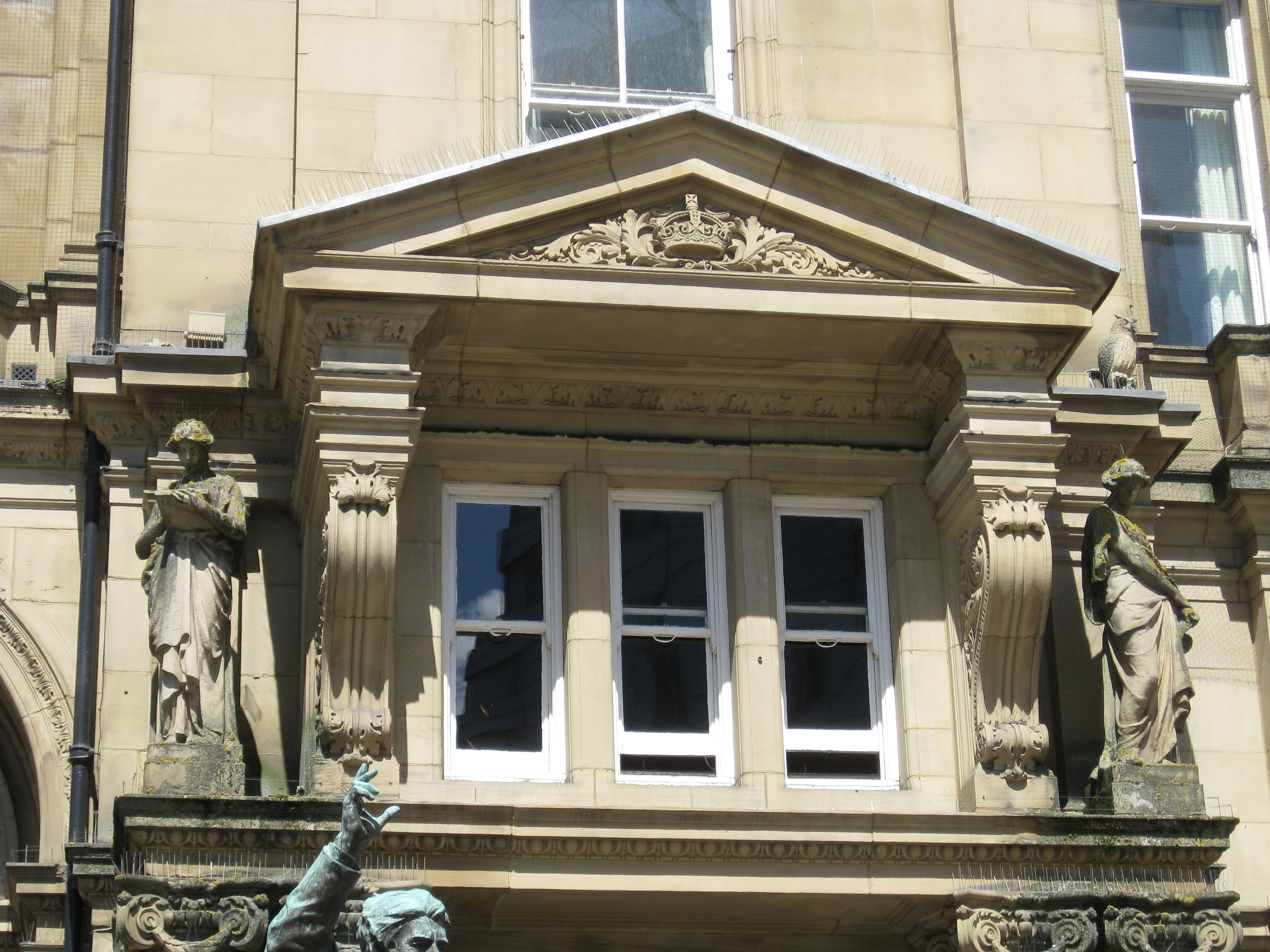
Reading and Philosophy and an owl

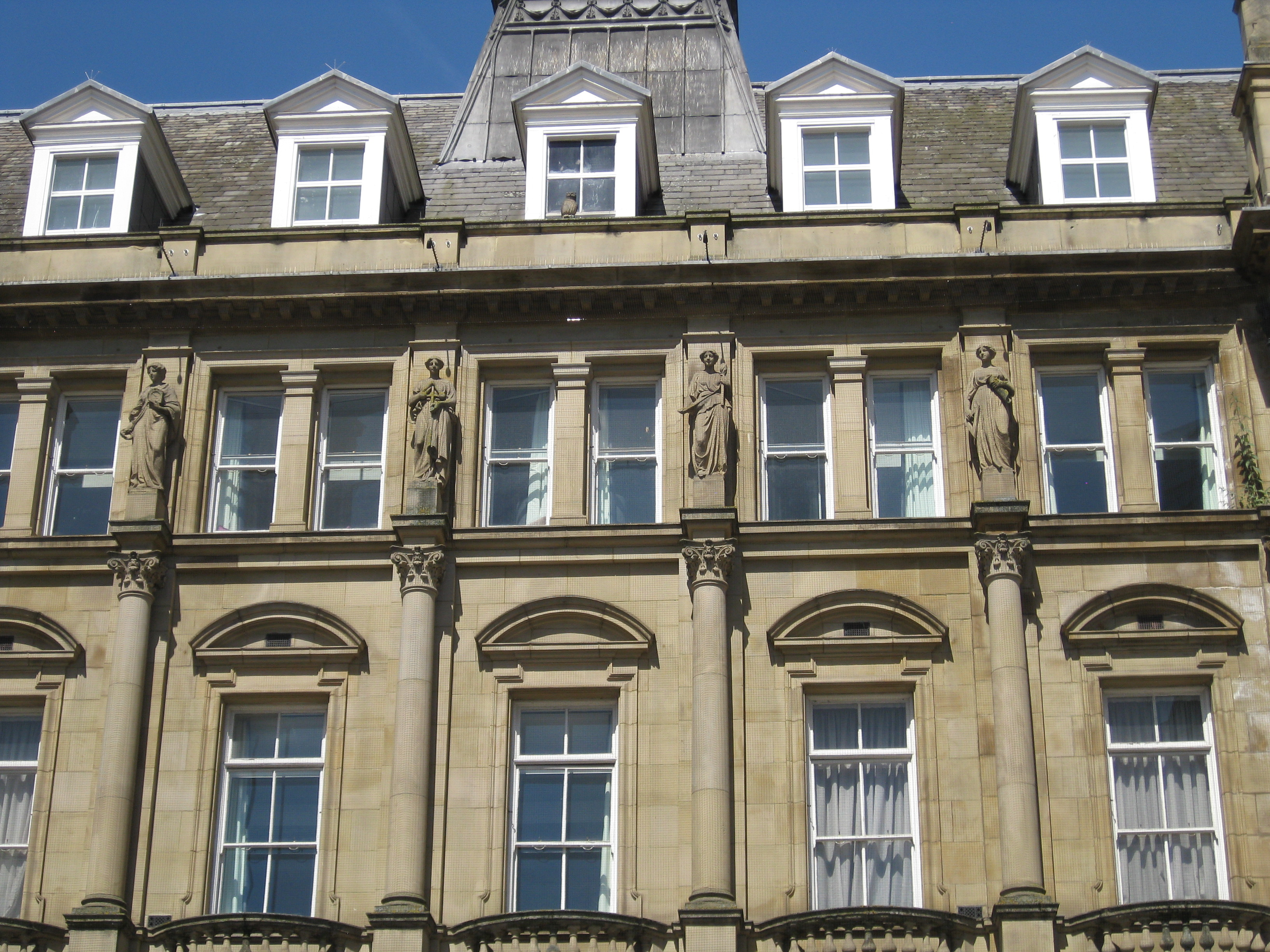
Upper storeys, including figures for Time, Air, Light, and Earth

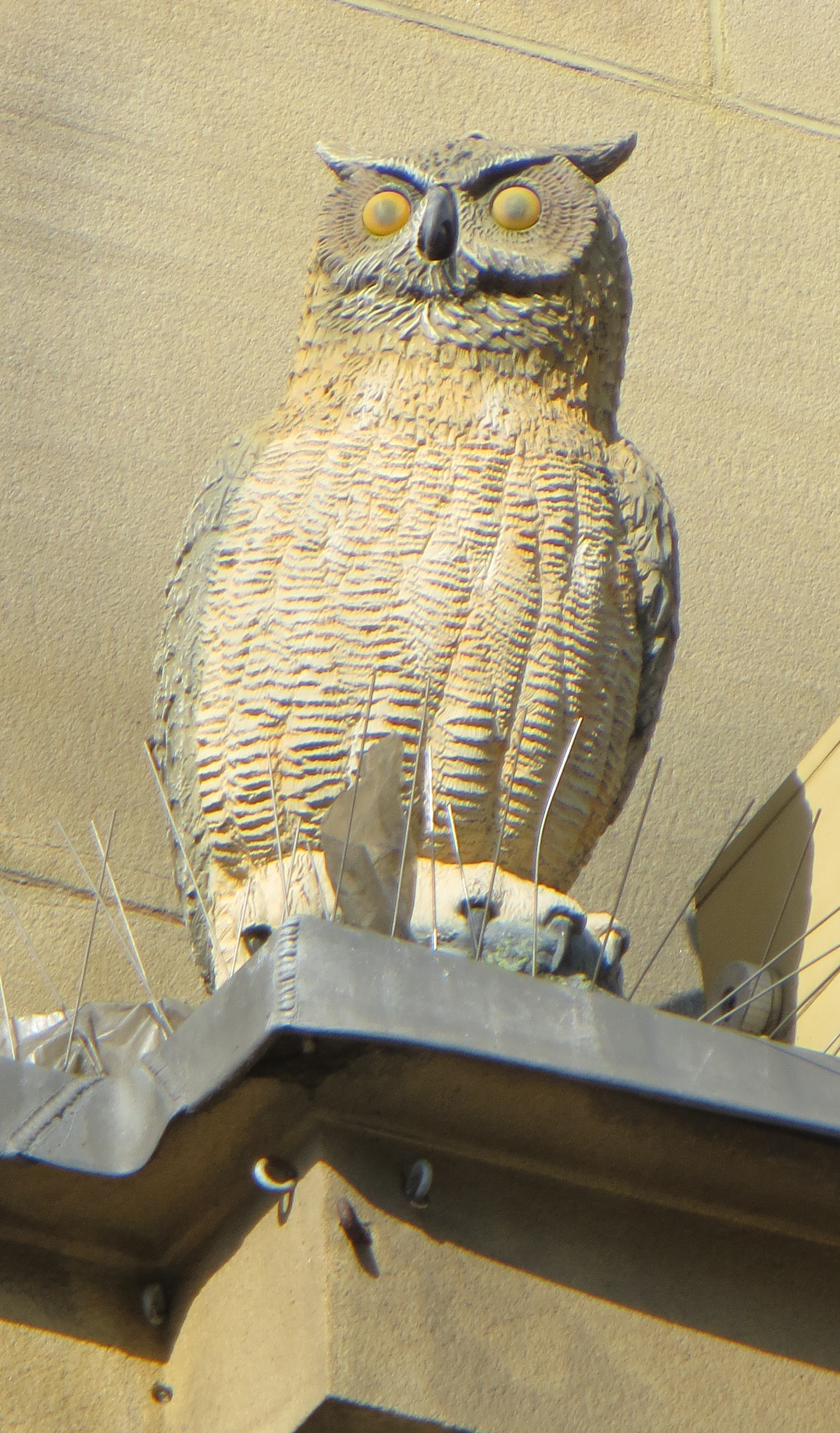
Sculpture of owl on a ledge

=== Surrounding buildings ===
The square is overlooked by the listed buildings Queens Hotel on the South and Mill Hill Chapel on the East, plus a modern skyscraper, No. 1 City Square (Norwich Union Building) completed 1998 by Abbey Hanson Rowe on the North. The sculpture "Legs walking" by Leeds-born Kenneth Armitage was erected outside Mill Hill Chapel in 2018. On the Southwest between Quebec Street and Wellington Street is the former Majestic Cinema and Ballroom (1921), a Grade II listed building in terracotta by the Leeds Fireclay Co. On the Southeast corner is the Park Plaza Hotel, a 2003 recladding of a 1965 office tower block called Exchange House, and the former Yorkshire Bank (1899, Grade II listed), now a bar, in granite with a distinctive copper dome.

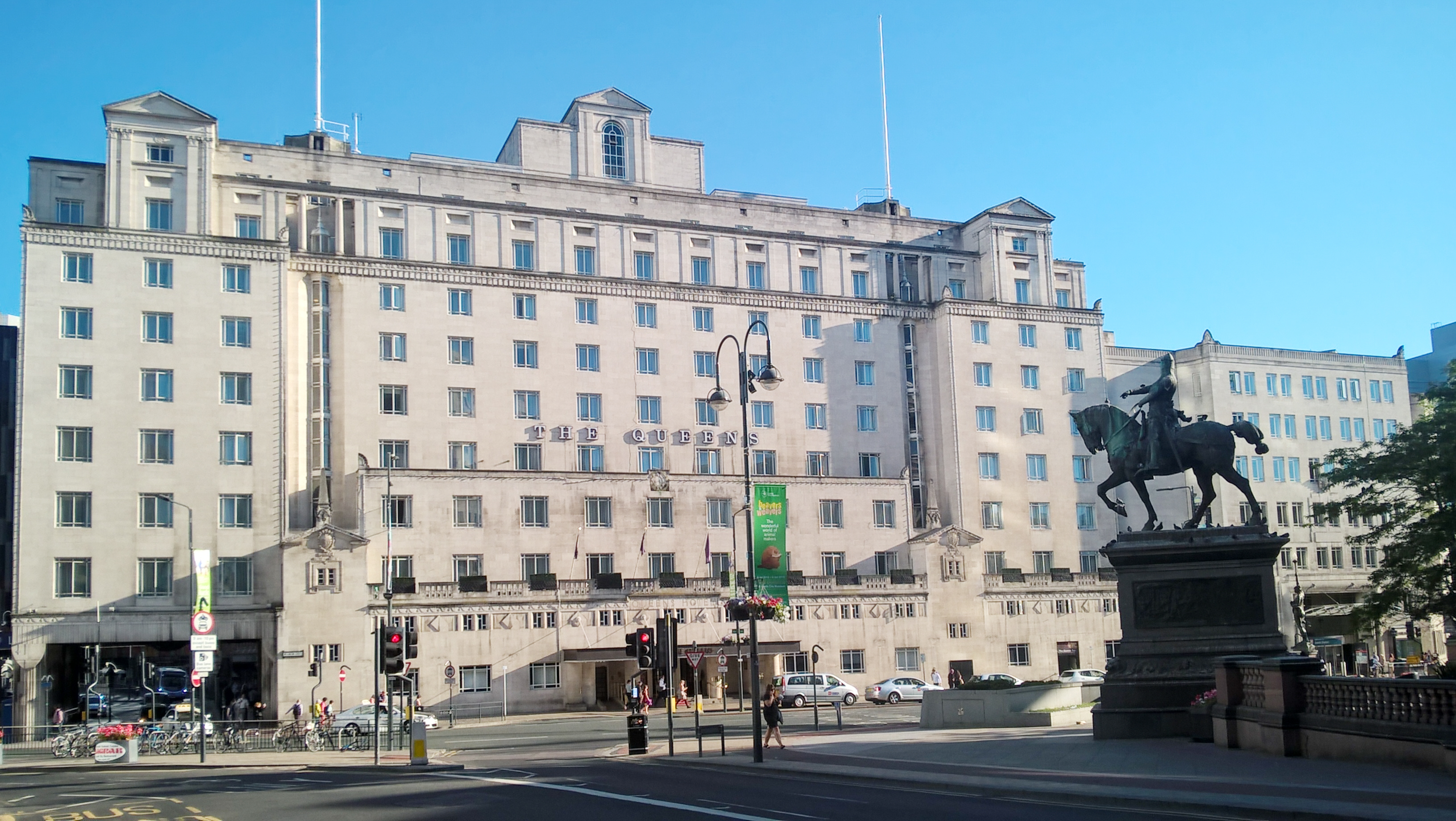
Queens Hotel

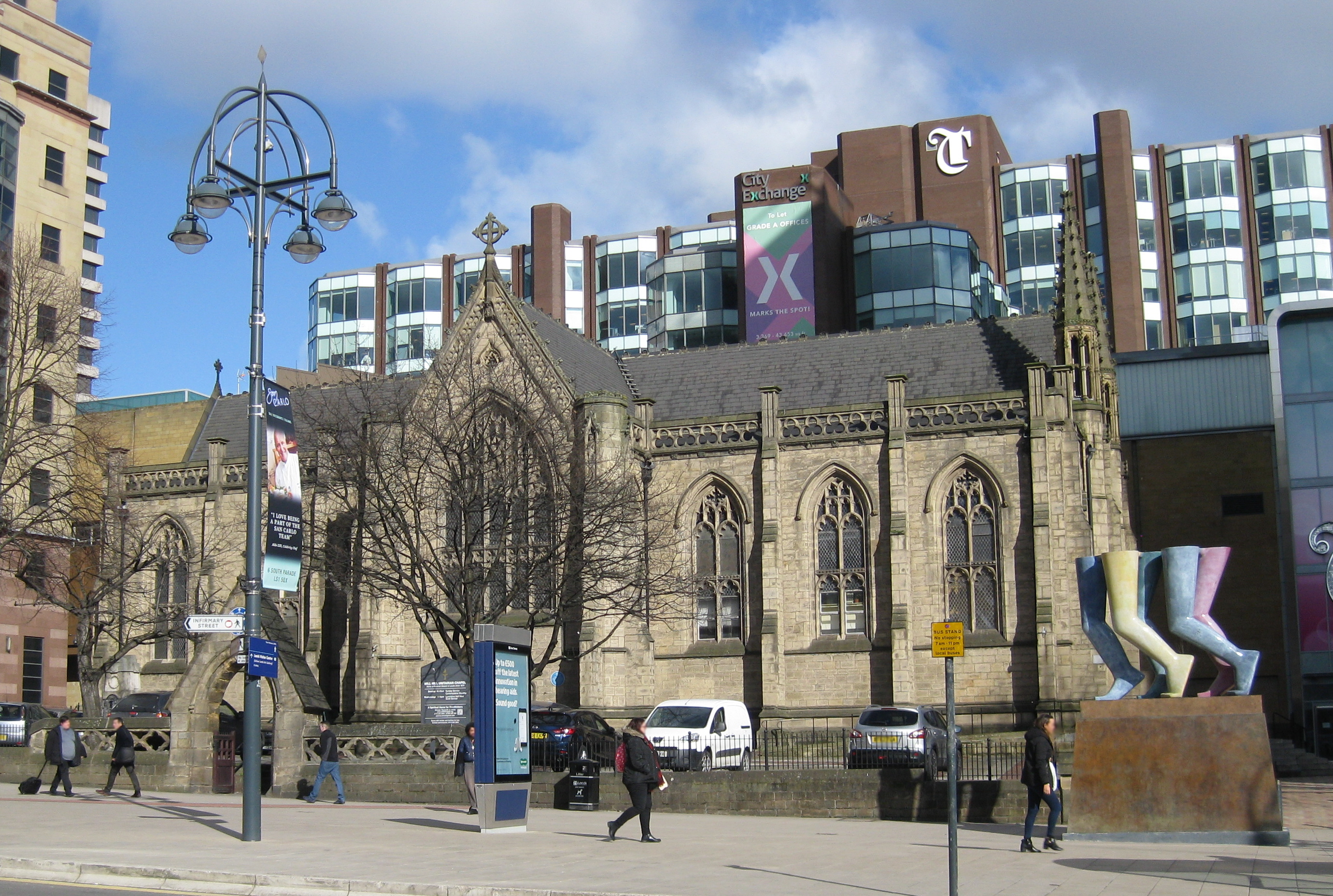
Mill Hill Chapel and the sculpture "Legs Walking"

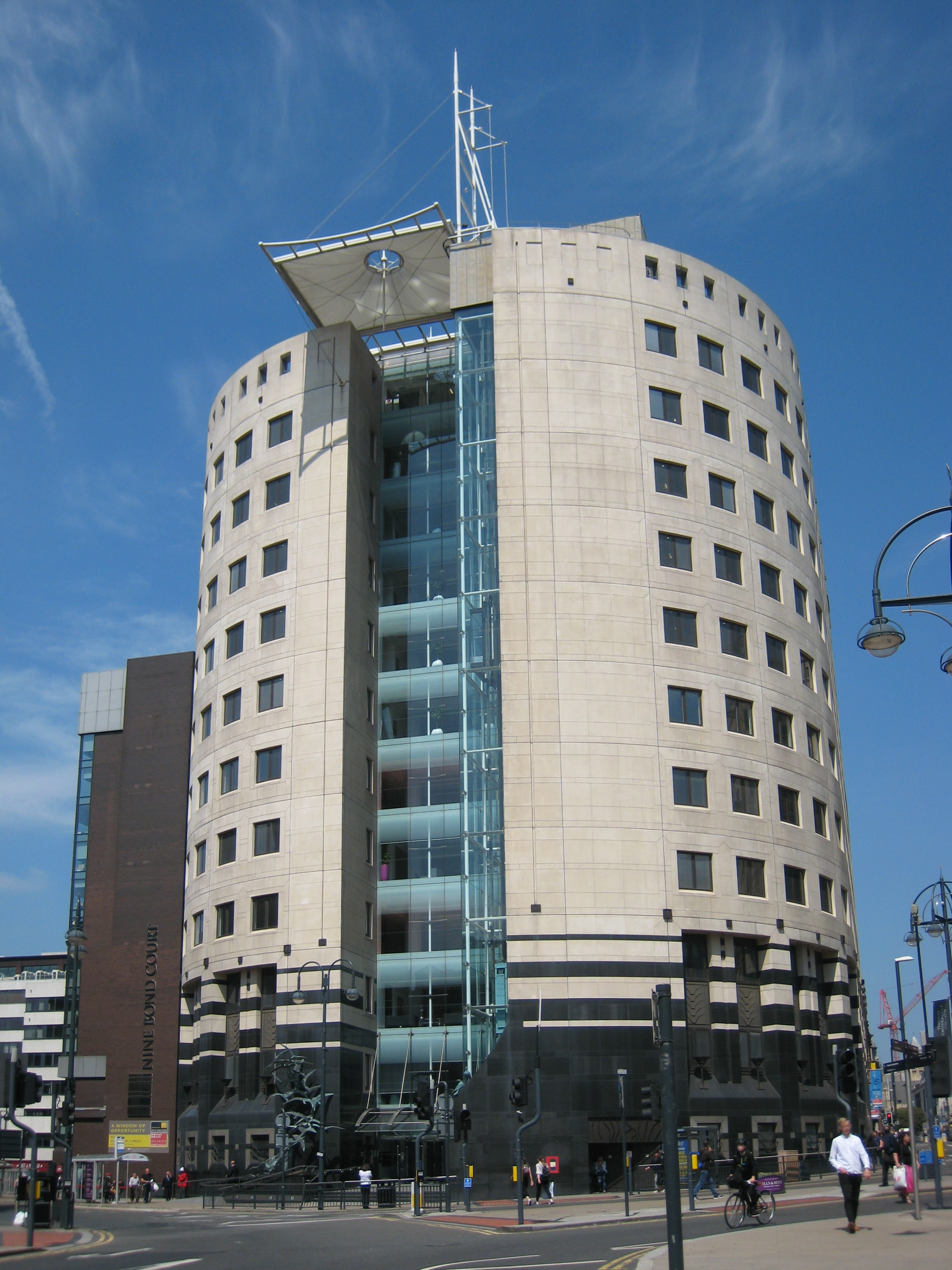
No 1 City Square (1998)

Majestic former Cinema and Dance Hall

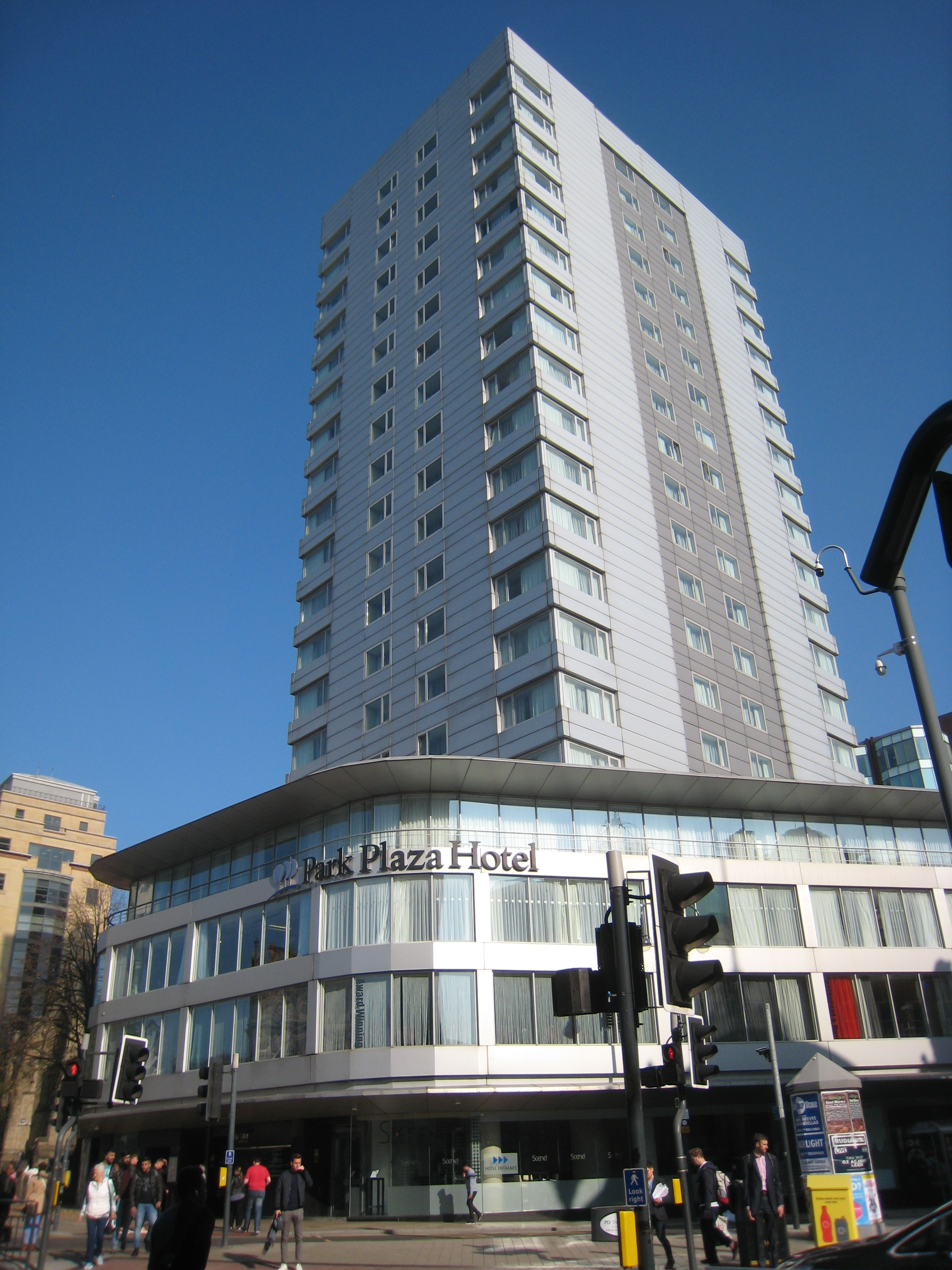
Park Plaza Hotel

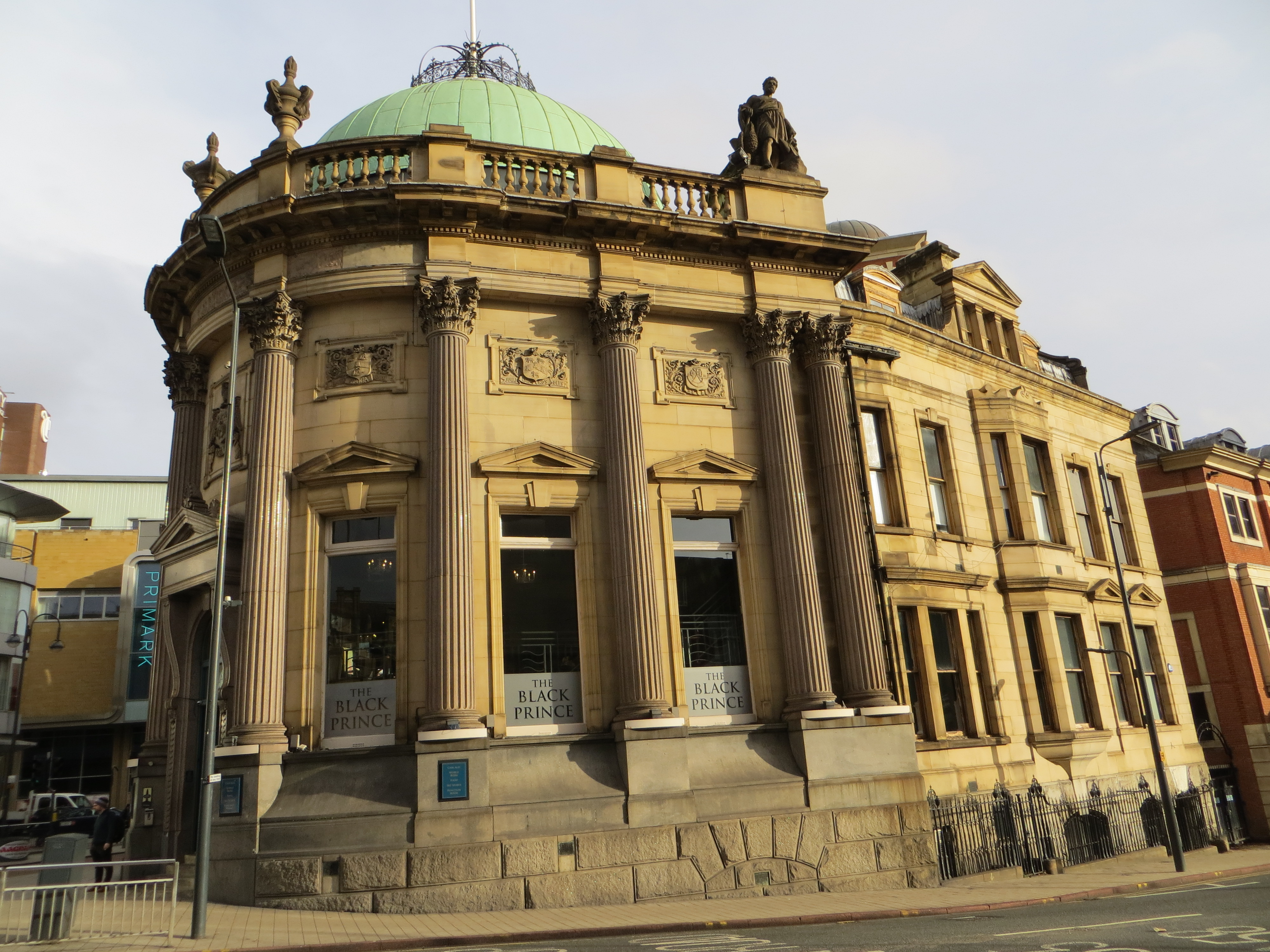
Former Yorkshire Bank

== White Rose Way ==
The Square is the official start point for the 104-mile (167 km) long White Rose Way, a long distance walking trail which finishes in Scarborough, North Yorkshire.

== See also ==
- Leeds city centre
- Millennium Square, Leeds
- Park Square, Leeds
